= Reign of Augustus =

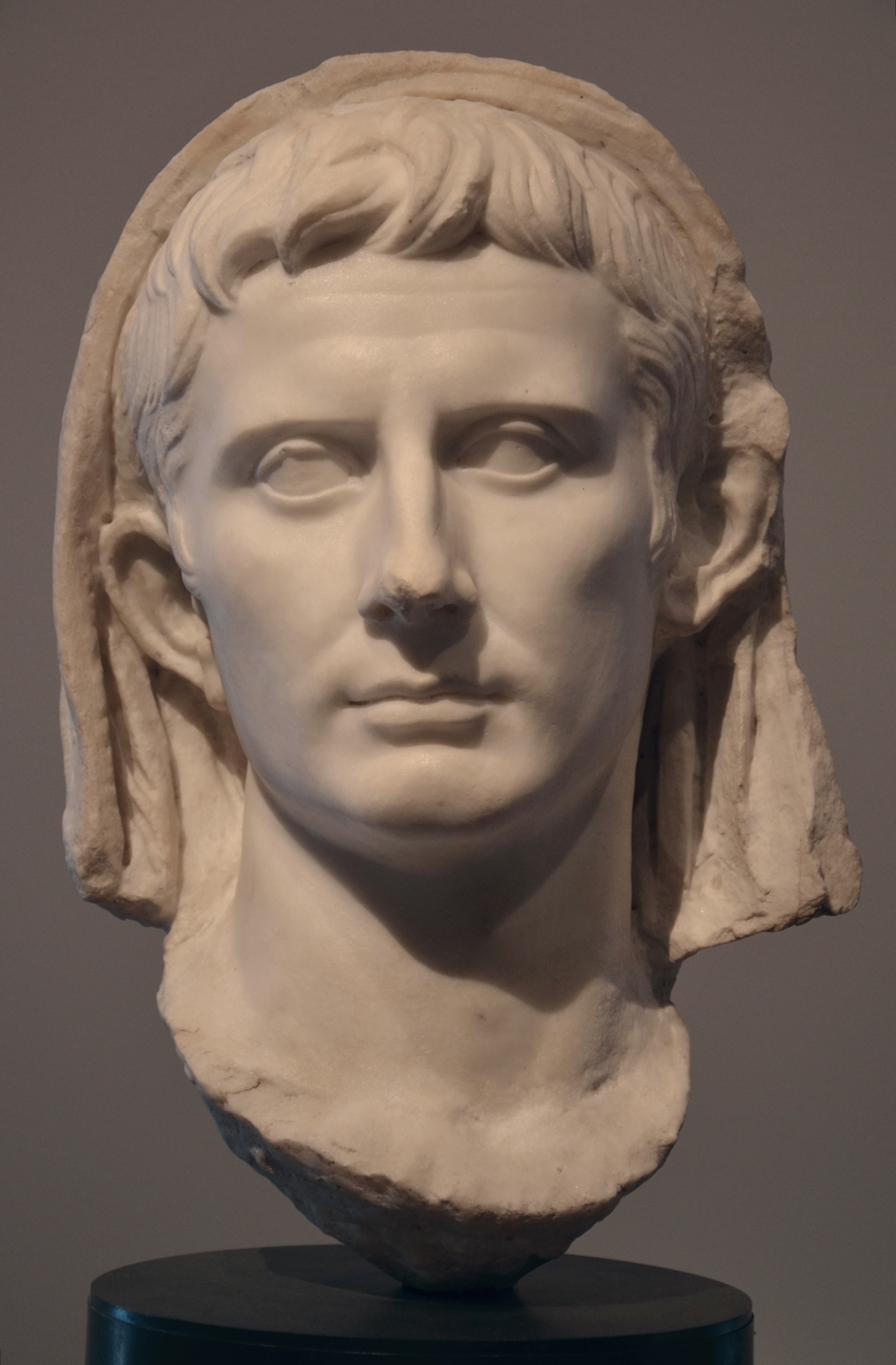
Veiled head of Augustus, 1st century BC

The reign of Augustus as Rome's first emperor began in 27 BC with his first settlement with the Roman Senate, which granted him extraordinary proconsular powers, control over half of Rome's provinces and most of its armies, and the title of augustus ('the revered'). Prior to this event he is labeled by historians as Octavian (Latin: Octavianus), having been born Gaius Octavius, before adopting the name of his great-uncle Gaius Julius Caesar, who named him as his primary heir in his will. In 30 BC Octavian defeated fellow Roman triumvir Mark Antony and his wife Cleopatra, Queen of the Ptolemaic Kingdom, conquering Egypt and bringing it under his personal possession. Styling himself as princeps ('leading citizen', or 'first citizen'), Augustus sought to uphold the facade that he was a restorer of the Roman Republic, though his reign is viewed as the beginning of the Principate phase of the Roman Empire, which was ruled subsequently by members of his imperial family. After his death in AD 14, Augustus was deified and succeeded by his stepson and adopted son Tiberius.

During his second settlement with the Roman Senate in 23 BC, Augustus resigned from the consulship. Augustus was also known from the consulship and was not elected to this position again until 5 and 2 BC, so that he could help foster the political careers of his grandsons Gaius and Lucius Caesar. However, Augustus was granted the additional powers of the tribunate and censorship, holding these privileges for life and without formal election to either of these offices. He was granted authority to dictate affairs within the pomerium of Rome. Through his legates, he exercised direct control over provinces allotted to him by the Senate, but also interfered in the governance of provinces nominally controlled by the Senate through its proconsul governors. With the death of former triumvir Lepidus in 12 BC, Augustus assumed the title of pontifex maximus ('supreme pontiff'), head of Rome's College of Pontiffs. In 2 BC, the Senate also conferred on Augustus the title of pater patriae ('father of the country').

Augustus also conducted Rome's diplomacy. The Senate deferred to his decisions in the realm of foreign relations as he established peace treaties with the Parthian Empire in West Asia (to the east of Roman Syria) and the Kingdom of Kush in Northeast Africa (to the south of Roman Egypt). Augustus oversaw military campaigns in various regions. He completed the Roman conquest of Hispania with the Cantabrian Wars in the northern Iberian peninsula. In Southeastern and Central Europe, Augustus also ensured the Roman conquest and annexation of Dalmatia, Pannonia, Noricum, and Raetia. In Germania, Roman armies conquered as far as the Elbe River. However, with the defeat of Publius Quinctilius Varus by the forces of the Cherusci chief Arminius at the Battle of the Teutoburg Forest in AD 9, Augustus settled on defending the Rhineland as Rome's northern frontier.

== Control of Egypt ==
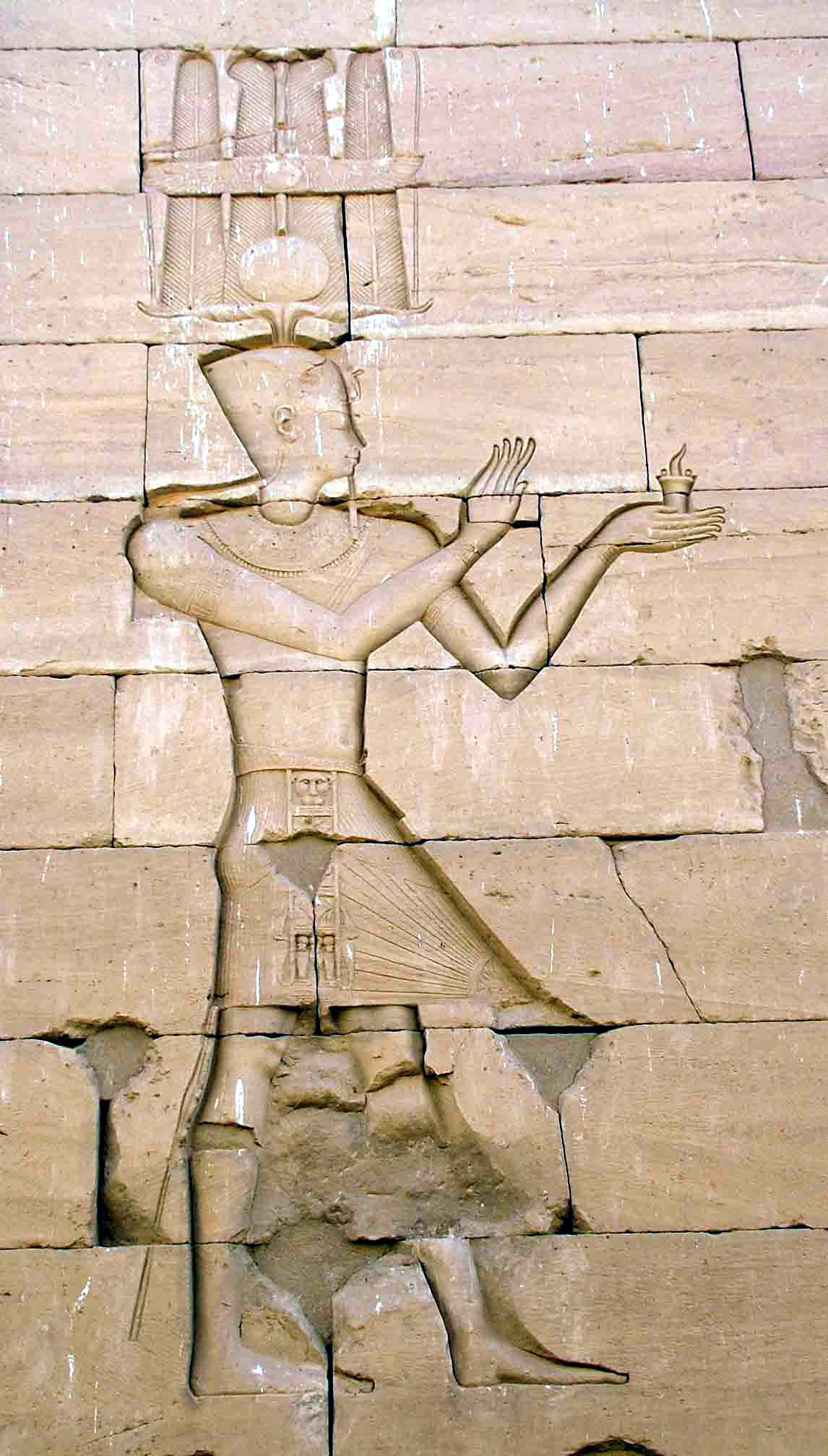
Augustus as Roman pharaoh in an Egyptian-style stone carving at the Temple of Kalabsha in Nubia; Augustus was commonly depicted in Egyptian art performing sacrifices to Egyptian deities.

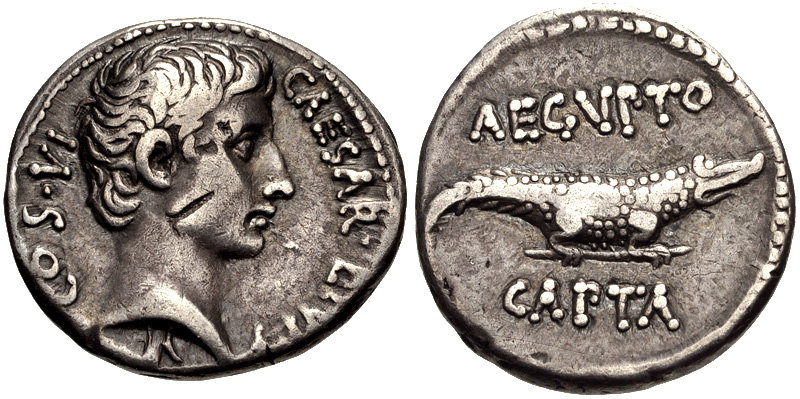
A denarius of Octavian minted in 28 BC at Pergamon, the reverse depicting a Nile crocodile from Egypt and caption that reads AEGVPTO CAPTA ('Egypt conquered')

In 31 BC Octavian's general Marcus Vipsanius Agrippa defeated the naval forces of Roman triumvir Mark Antony and his wife Cleopatra, Queen of Ptolemaic Egypt, at the Battle of Actium off the northwestern coast of Roman Greece. By August 30 BC the forces of Octavian defeated the forces of Antony and Cleopatra in Alexandria, after which Antony and then Cleopatra took their own lives. The conquest of Ptolemaic Egypt relieved the financial debts incurred by Octavian during the civil wars. He controlled Roman Egypt directly, forbade Roman Senators to travel there, and appointed equestrian governor Cornelius Gallus to supervise its administration and enormously lucrative taxation. While in Alexandria in 30 BC, Octavian visited the tomb of Alexander the Great, the conqueror king he emulated and associated himself with through similar artistic portraits. It is alleged in one ancient source that Octavian accidentally snapped off the nose of the body of Alexander in his tomb. (Note: The "spiteful" source noted by Galinsky (2012, p. 56) that makes this claim is Dio, Book 51.) Octavian's conquest of Ptolemaic Egypt brought an end to the Hellenistic period initiated by Alexander. It also cemented the cultural formation of a Greek East and Latin West in the Mediterranean and the type of cosmopolitan universal monarchy espoused by Alexander, albeit one now centered on Rome.

Octavian would become the first Roman emperor as Augustus and also the first Roman pharaoh of Egypt, though he did not partake in Egyptian coronation rites or worship of the Apis bull, and he never traveled to Egypt again after 30 BC. As historian Duane W. Roller explains, Augustus banned Egyptian religious rites within the city limits of Rome, but Egyptian style art and architecture spread in various forms to Rome itself under Augustus, seen in edifices such as the 15 BC pyramid tomb of Gaius Cestius. Historian Adrian Goldsworthy summarizes a xenophobic passage found in Virgil's epic poem the Aeneid about Octavian's conquest of Egypt, with the view that Actium was a "victory for the virtues and traditions of a united Italy supported by wholesome deities". He continues by writing that the enemy "were the chaotic forces of the east with their weird gods – the jackal-headed Anubis, god of the underworld, is singled out," even though Cleopatra and her Ptolemaic ancestors were Greek. Virgil also stressed how this victory brought about much needed peace and stability.

Before returning to Rome, Octavian spent the winter of 30 BC on the Greek island of Samos. In August 29 BC Octavian was awarded with three triumphs in Rome for his victories in Illyria, Greece, and Egypt. Octavian and Agrippa were elected as the consuls for 28 BC, and granted certain powers of the censor—but not with the office itself—for the duty of conducting Rome's census.

== Principate ==
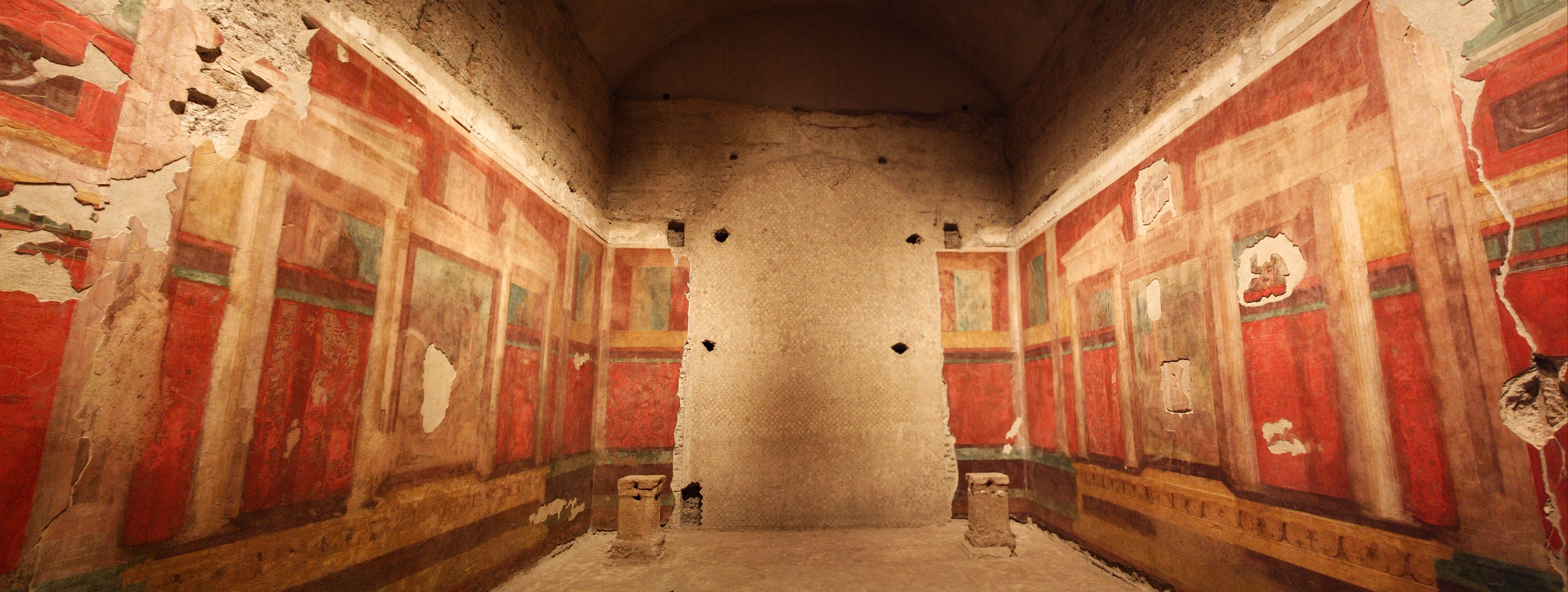
Fresco paintings inside the House of Augustus, his alleged but not verified residence on the Palatine Hill during his reign as emperor

After Actium and the defeat of Antony and Cleopatra, Octavian was in a position to rule the entire Republic under an unofficial principate—with himself as princeps ('leading citizen' or 'first citizen' (Note: In his translation of Tacitus, Annals, 1.1.1, historian Klaus Bringmann prefers the term 'first citizen' for the Latin princeps used to describe Augustus. Likewise, historian Karl Galinsky states about Augustus: "his title was not king or dictator but princeps, first citizen". Historian John Stuart Richardson prefers the term 'leading citizen' as a translation for princeps. Werner Eck and Sarolta Takács describe princeps as "first or chief man in the state". Adrian Goldsworthy provides two different translations of princeps: 'first citizen' or 'leading citizen'.))—which he achieved through incremental power gains. He did so by courting the Senate and the people while upholding the republican traditions of Rome, maintaining the carefully curated appearance that he was not aspiring to dictatorship or monarchy. The term princeps was previously applied to members of the Roman nobility who distinguished themselves in service to the Republic, and Octavian would embrace this title as part of his cultivated image as a restorer of the Republic.

Years of civil war had left Rome in a state of near lawlessness, but the Roman people were not prepared to accept the control of Octavian as a despot. At the same time, Octavian could not give up his authority without risking further civil wars. The Senate and people of Rome desired a return to stability, traditional legality, civility, and the assurance of free elections—which would be conducted in name at least under Octavian. Goldsworthy highlights this with the example of the Senate under consul Octavian decreeing that the doors to the Temple of Janus should be shut on 11 January 29 BC, a ritual that declared Rome was no longer at war, despite ongoing campaigns in Gaul and Hispania.

Goldsworthy stresses that Augustus did not have a carefully planned design in fashioning this principate regime, which was far from inevitable, and relied much on chance, experimentation, improvisation, and trial-by-error. Historian T. P. Wiseman argues that, given the overwhelmingly positive reception of Augustus in contemporary Roman sources, Augustus should not be viewed as an unlawful usurper masking his monarchical intentions or autocratic wishes. Patricia Southern surmises that Octavian needed to at least keep up the appearance of being bound by term limits for the consulship and other offices: "Octavian probably remembered very starkly that Caesar did not survive for more than a few weeks after accepting the appointment as dictator perpetuo". With the exception of Sulla, Gaius Julius Caesar had been elected as dictator for unprecedented lengths of time, with a one year term in 48 BC, a ten-year term in 46 BC, and finally as dictator perpetuo ('dictator in perpetuity') in 44 BC, a month before his assassination on the Ides of March.

== First settlement ==
=== Patronage ===
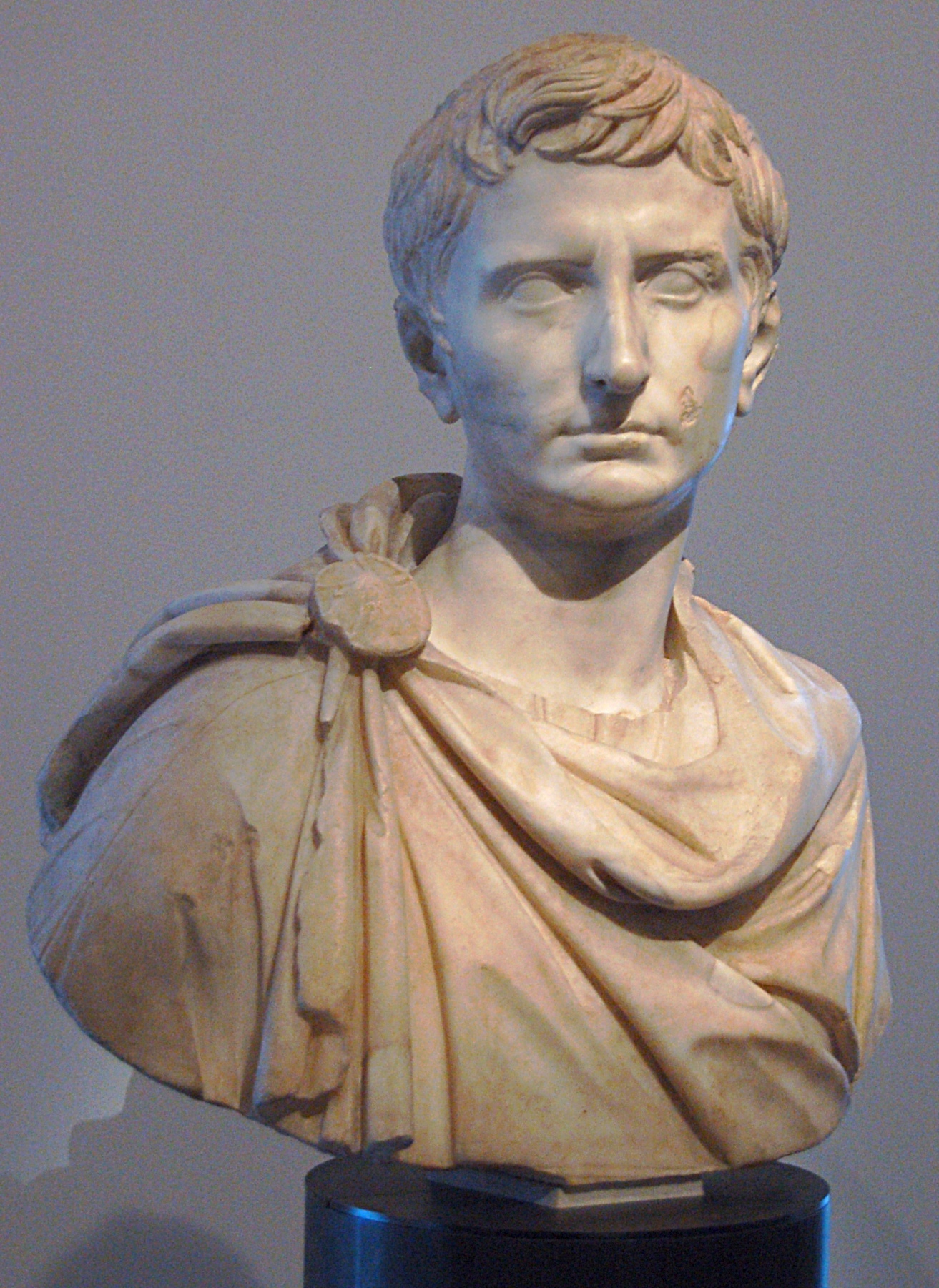
A Roman bust of Octavian, dated c. 30 BC, Capitoline Museums, Rome

On 13 January 27 BC, Octavian made a show of returning full power to the Senate and relinquishing his control of the Roman provinces and their armies. Octavian was no longer in direct control of the provinces and their armies, but he retained the loyalty of soldiers and veterans alike. The careers of many clients and adherents depended on his patronage, as his financial power was unrivaled in the Roman Republic. On this, the historians Werner Eck and Sarolta Takács state that:

The sum of his power derived first of all from various powers of office delegated to him by the Senate and people, secondly from his immense private fortune, and thirdly from numerous patron-client relationships he established with individuals and groups throughout the Empire. All of them taken together formed the basis of his auctoritas, which he himself emphasized as the foundation of his political actions.

To a large extent, the public was aware of the vast financial resources that Octavian commanded. He failed to encourage enough senators to finance the building and maintenance of networks of roads in Italy in 20 BC, but he undertook direct responsibility for them. This was publicized on the Roman currency issued in 16 BC, after he donated vast amounts of money to the aerarium Saturni, the public treasury.

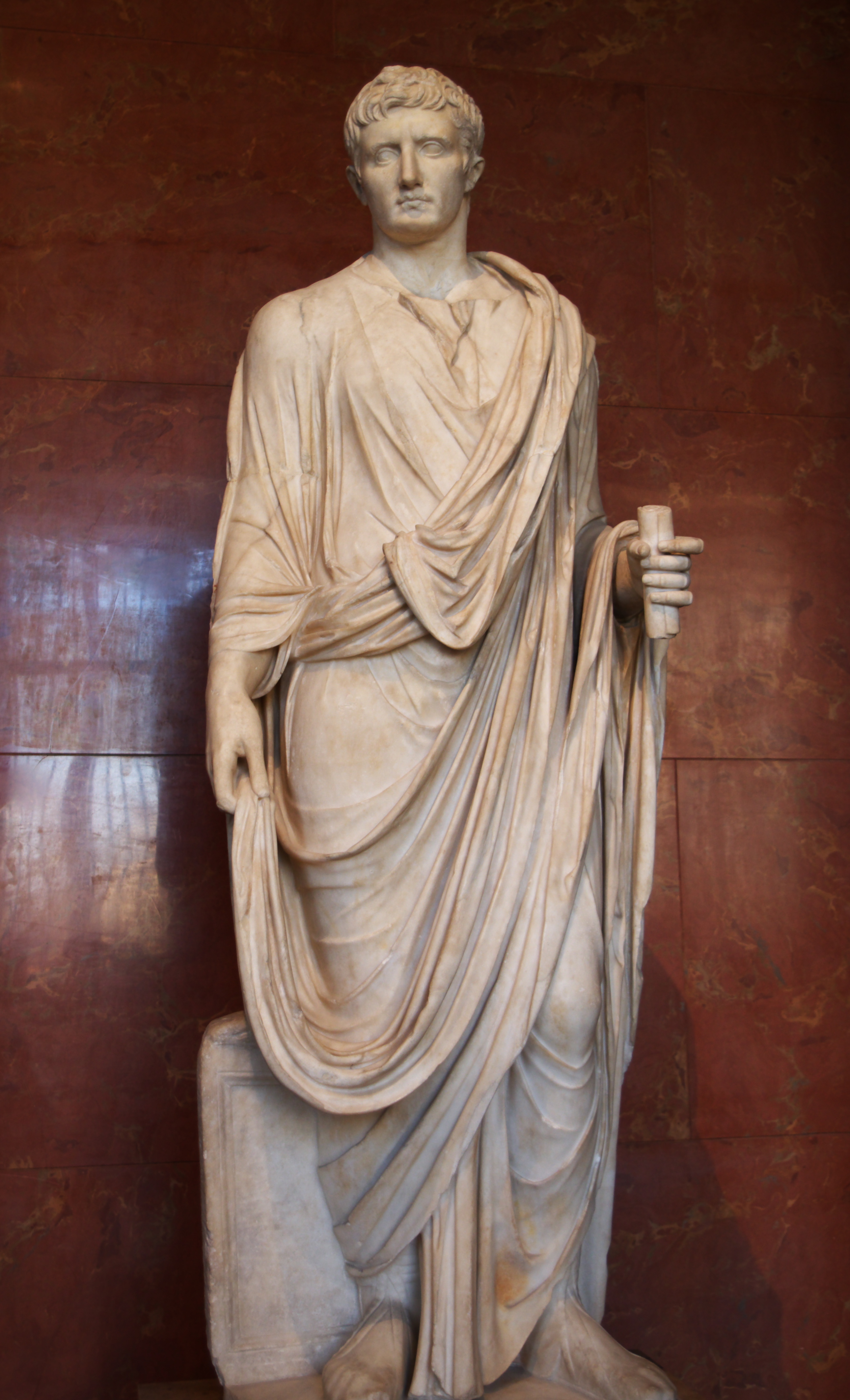
Octavian as a magistrate. The statue's marble head was made c. 30–20 BC, the body sculpted in the 2nd century AD (Louvre, Paris)

=== Control of provinces ===
Octavian's power was ultimately rooted in his control over Rome's military and ability to eliminate the opposition by force if necessary. The Senate proposed to Octavian, the victor of Rome's civil wars, that he once again assume command of the provinces. The Senate's proposal was a ratification of Octavian's extra-constitutional power. Through the Senate, Octavian was able to continue the appearance of a still-functional constitution. Feigning reluctance, on 16 January 27 BC he accepted a ten-year responsibility of overseeing provinces that were considered chaotic. The provinces ceded to Augustus for that ten-year period constituted much of the Roman world, including all of Hispania and Gaul, Syria, Cilicia, Cyprus, and Egypt. Moreover, command of these provinces provided Augustus with control over the majority of Rome's legions. This agreement with the Senate is known as the first settlement, in which Octavian—now Augustus—was granted imperial powers and had his autocratic authority officially recognized, while maintaining the appearance that he had restored the Republic and gave power back to the Senate.

Octavian-Augustus became the most powerful political figure in the city of Rome and its provinces, but he did not have a monopoly on political and martial power. The Senate still controlled North Africa, an important regional producer of grain, as well as Illyria and Macedonia, two strategic regions with several legions. However, the Senate had control of only five or six legions distributed among three senatorial proconsuls, compared to the twenty legions under the control of Augustus, and their control of these regions did not amount to any political or military challenge to Augustus. Nevertheless, the Senate sharing control over the provinces with Augustus was not without precedent during the Republic, and Augustus operated within republican legal frameworks to amass his power. Augustus's control of entire provinces even followed Republican-era precedents for the limited objective of securing peace and creating stability. For instance, Pompey had been given a similar level of command across the Roman world, including control over military operations across all Mediterranean shorelines extending 50 miles inland, and possibly greater authority than provincial governors in these areas. Pompey was given term limits for extraordinary proconsular authority that included legates who answered to him, not the Senate, during his campaign against Mediterranean pirates in 67 BC and the subsequent Third Mithridatic War against Mithridates VI of Pontus.

While Augustus acted as consul in Rome, he dispatched senators to the provinces under his command as his representatives to manage provincial affairs and ensure that his orders were carried out. The provinces not under Augustus's control were overseen by governors chosen by the Senate. However, after the first settlement, Augustus issued instructions and edicts not only to his own legates but also to independent proconsuls governing public provinces that were nominally under senatorial control.

=== Title of Augustus ===
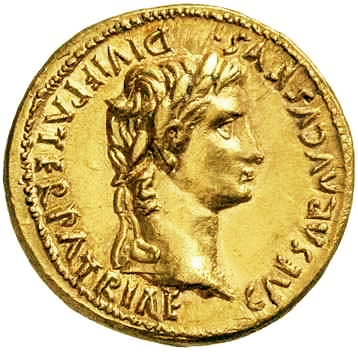
Aureus minted c. AD 13, marked: Caesar Augustus Divi F Pater Patriae

On 16 January 27 BC (Note: Fasti Praenestini;Feriale Cumanum. Ovid's Fasti gives 13 January, the same date in which the Senate powers were "restored". The 3rd-century De die Natali gives 17 January, a mistake.) the Senate gave Octavian the new title of augustus. Augustus, from the Latin augere 'to increase', can be translated as "illustrious one", "sublime", or "revered". The title for augustus used in Ancient Greek and the eastern half of the Roman Empire was sebastos (Σεβαστός, the "revered"). It was a title of religious authority rather than a political one, and it indicated that Octavian now approached divinity. Goldsworthy explains further:

Augustus carried heavy religious overtones of the very Roman tradition of seeking divine guidance and approval through augury. Ennius, Rome's earliest and most revered poet, spoke of the City being founded with "august augury" in a passage as familiar to Romans as the most famous Shakespearean quotes are to us today.

Roller writes that Munatius Plancus was responsible not only for building the Temple of Saturn in Rome and leading the diplomatic negotiations that ensured peace with the Parthians in 20 BC, but also for recommending the title augustus to Octavian in 27 BC. Eck, Takács, and Goldsworthy clarify that Munatius Plancus introduced the motion in the Senate for honoring Octavian, and may have been operating on his instructions. The name of Augustus was also more favorable than Romulus, the previous one which he styled for himself in reference to the story of the legendary founder of Rome, which symbolized a second founding of Rome. The title of Romulus was associated too strongly with notions of monarchy and kingship, an image that Octavian tried to avoid. The Senate also confirmed his position as princeps senatus ('leader of the Senate'), the member of the Senate with the highest precedence. The honorific augustus was inherited by future Roman emperors and became the de facto main title of the emperor.

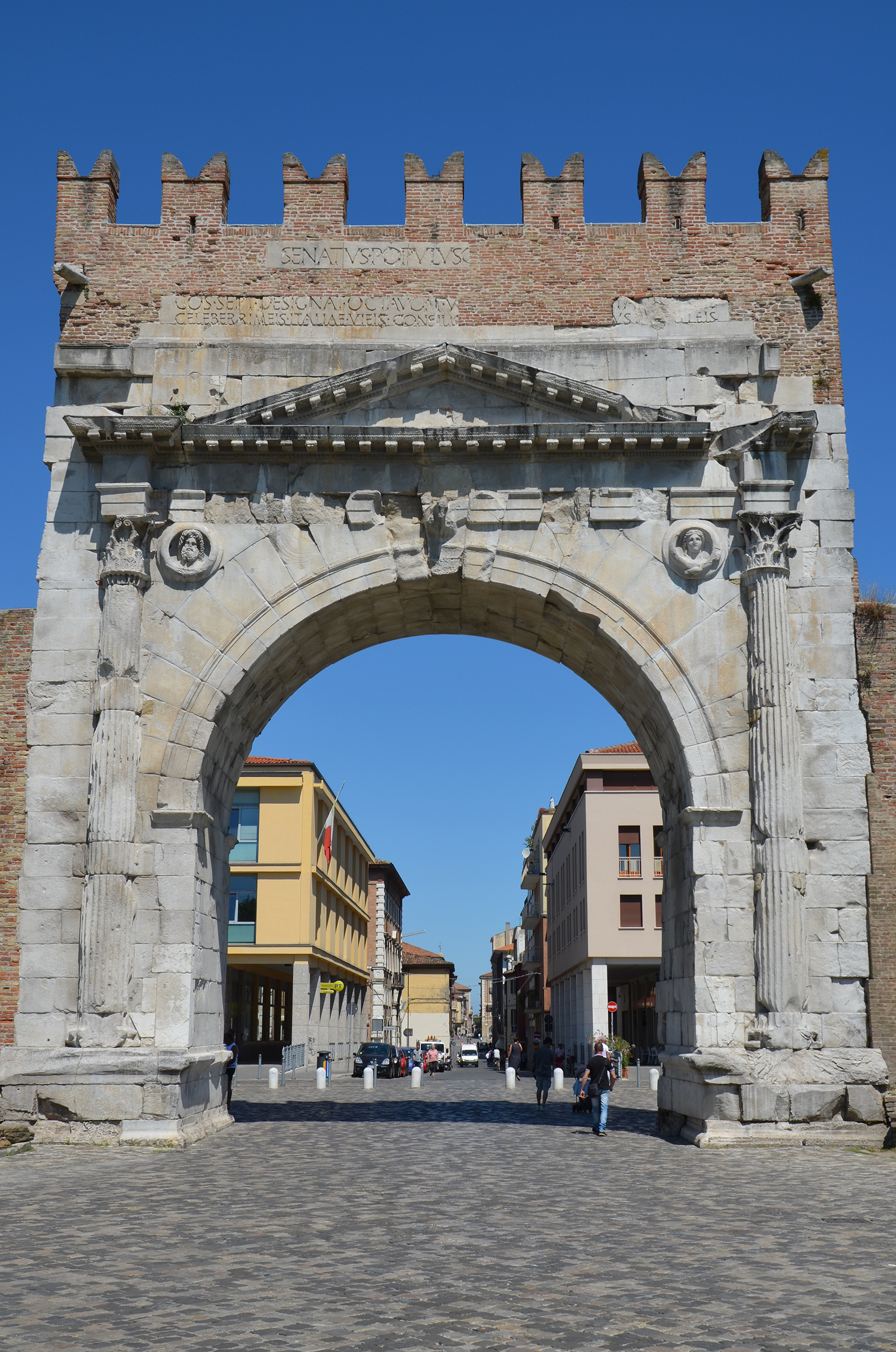
The Arch of Augustus in Rimini (Ariminum), dedicated to Augustus by the Senate in 27 BC, is one of the oldest preserved triumphal arches in Italy.

Augustus styled himself as Imperator Caesar divi filius ('Commander Caesar son of the deified one'). With this title, he boasted his familial link to deified Julius Caesar, and the use of imperator signified a permanent link to the Roman tradition of victory. (Note: He was first proclaimed imperator on 16 April 43 BC, after the Battle of Forum Gallorum.) He transformed Caesar, a cognomen for one branch of the Julian family, into a new imperial family line that began with him. In the 1st century AD the emperor Vespasian adopted the name Imperator Caesar Vespasianus Augustus, with "Augustus" as a cognomen to help legitimize his reign and Flavian assumption of Julio-Claudian patrimony.

Augustus was granted the right to hang the corona civica ('civic crown') above his door and to have laurels drape his doorposts. However, he renounced flaunting insignia of power such as holding a scepter, wearing a diadem, or wearing the golden crown and purple toga of his predecessor Julius Caesar. If he refused to symbolize his power by donning and bearing these items on his person, the Senate nonetheless awarded him with a golden shield displayed in the meeting hall of the Curia, bearing the inscription virtus, pietas, clementia, iustitia ('valor, piety, clemency, and justice'). The inscription on this shield represented the Roman virtus, a moral characteristic which Augustus had allegedly achieved while restoring the favor of the gods for Rome. Augustus did not need to stay in Rome to retain these powers and privileges. He left for Gaul in the summer of 27 BC, and from 26 to 24 BC governed the Empire from Tarraco in Roman Spain, overseeing military campaigns in the Iberian peninsula until his return to Rome.

== Second settlement ==
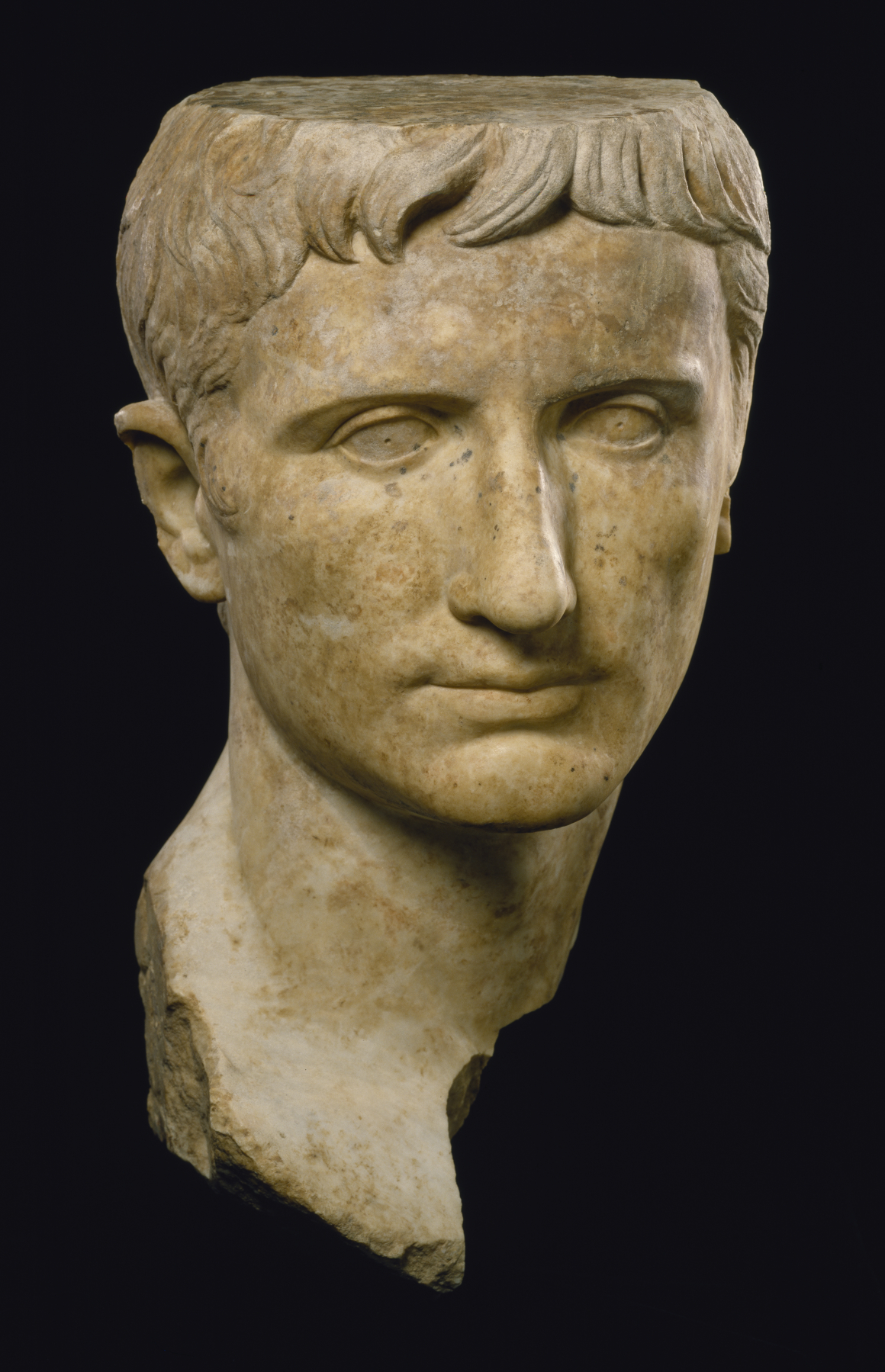
Portraits of Augustus show the emperor with idealized features.

By 23 BC, some of the un-republican implications were becoming apparent concerning the settlement of 27 BC. Augustus's retention of an annual consulate drew attention to his de facto dominance over the Roman political system and cut in half the opportunities for others to achieve what was still nominally the preeminent position in the Roman state. Further, he was causing political problems by desiring to have his nephew Marcus Claudius Marcellus follow in his footsteps and eventually assume the principate in his turn. He appointed noted republican Calpurnius Piso (who had fought against Julius Caesar and supported Cassius and Brutus) as co-consul in 23 BC, (Note: Adrian Goldsworthy provides a hypothesis for why Augustus settled on Calpurnius Piso, a previous wartime rival, as consul in 23 BC, a move that "may have been meant as a sign of reconciliation, or at least as assurance that aristocrats from established families were able to enjoy the high honours they felt to be their due".) after his choice Aulus Terentius Varro Murena died unexpectedly.

=== Resignation from the consulship ===
In the late spring Augustus had a severe illness and on his supposed deathbed made arrangements that would ensure the continuation of the principate in some form. Goldsworthy notes that this illness involved liver problems that he had suffered periodically beforehand. Southern asserts that this illness was most likely caused by a liver abscess. Augustus also sought to allay senators' suspicions of his anti-republicanism. Augustus prepared to hand down his signet ring to his favored general Agrippa. However, Augustus handed over to his co-consul Piso all of his official documents, an account of public finances, and authority over listed troops in the provinces while Augustus's supposedly favored nephew Marcellus came away empty-handed. This was a surprise to many who believed Augustus would have named an heir to his position as an unofficial emperor.

Augustus bestowed only properties and possessions to his designated heirs, as an obvious system of institutionalized imperial inheritance would have provoked resistance and hostility among the republican-minded Romans fearful of monarchy. Given his actions in sidelining him, it appears that Augustus did not view the 19-year-old Marcellus as being ready to inherit his position as princeps. By giving his signet ring to Agrippa, Augustus was most likely signaling to the legions that Agrippa was to be his successor and that they should continue to obey Agrippa, constitutional procedure notwithstanding.

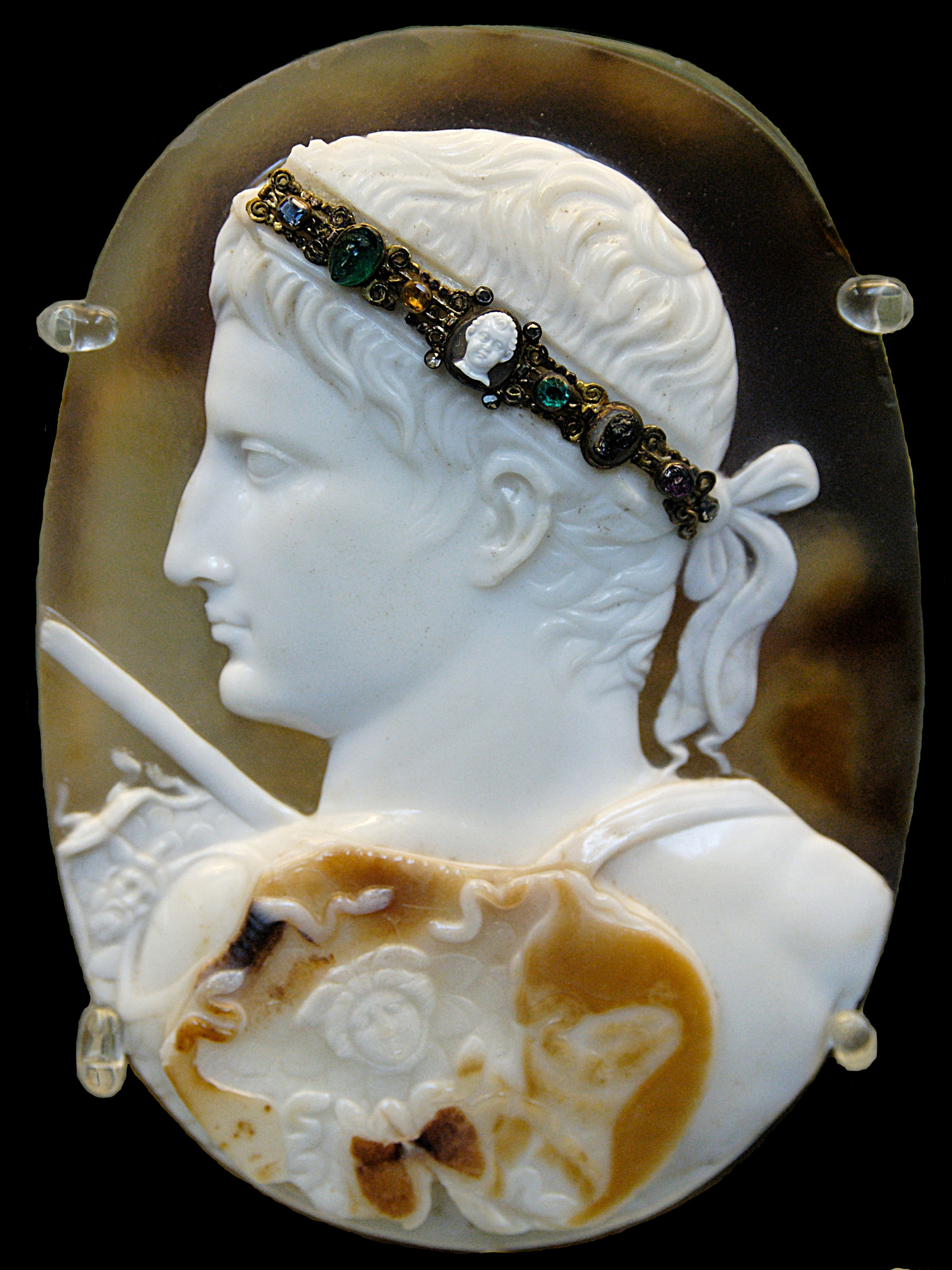
The Blacas Cameo showing Augustus wearing a gorgoneion on a three layered sardonyx cameo, and wearing a diadem that was added during the Middle Ages, and original artwork dated to AD 20–50

The emperor's illness subsided while under the care of his personal physician Antonius Musa, who most likely hailed from the Hellenized areas of the eastern half of the Roman Empire. He reversed the typical treatment of warm compresses, favoring cold ones. After recovering from his illness, the emperor lavished Musa with gifts and the Roman Senate gave him additional money plus the right to wear a golden ring. In honor of his medical treatment of Augustus, he was also granted exemption from taxation and a statue of him was erected next to that of Asclepius, the god of healing. Soon afterwards on 1 July 23 BC Augustus gave up his consulship. The only other times Augustus would serve as consul would be in the years 5 and 2 BC, both times to introduce his grandsons into public life. This was a clever ploy by Augustus; ceasing to serve as one of two annually elected consuls allowed aspiring senators a better chance to attain the consular position while allowing Augustus to exercise wider patronage within the senatorial class. Although Augustus had resigned as consul, he desired to retain his consular imperium not just in his provinces but throughout the empire. This desire, as well as the Marcus Primus affair, led to a second compromise between him and the Senate known as the second settlement.

=== Marcus Primus affair ===
After Augustus relinquished the annual consulship, he was no longer in an official position to rule the state. However, his dominant position remained unchanged over his 'imperial' provinces where he was still a proconsul. When he annually held the office of consul, he had the power to intervene with the affairs of the other provincial proconsuls appointed by the Senate throughout the empire, when he deemed necessary.

A second problem later arose showing the need for the second settlement in what became known as the "Marcus Primus affair". In late 24 or early 23 BC, charges were brought against Marcus Primus, the former proconsul (governor) of Macedonia, for waging a war without prior approval of the Senate on the Odrysian kingdom of Thrace, whose king was a Roman ally. He was defended by Lucius Licinius Varro Murena who told the trial that his client had received specific instructions from Augustus ordering him to attack the client state. Later, Primus testified that the orders came from the recently deceased Marcellus. Such orders, had they been given, would have been considered a breach of the Senate's prerogative under the settlement of 27 BC and its aftermath—i.e., before Augustus was granted imperium proconsulare maius—as Macedonia was a senatorial province under the Senate's jurisdiction, not an imperial province under the authority of Augustus. Such an action would have ripped away the veneer of republican restoration as promoted by Augustus, and exposed his fraud of merely being the first citizen, a first among equals. Even worse, the involvement of Marcellus provided proof that Augustus's policy was to have the youth take his place as princeps, instituting a form of monarchy—accusations that had already played out.

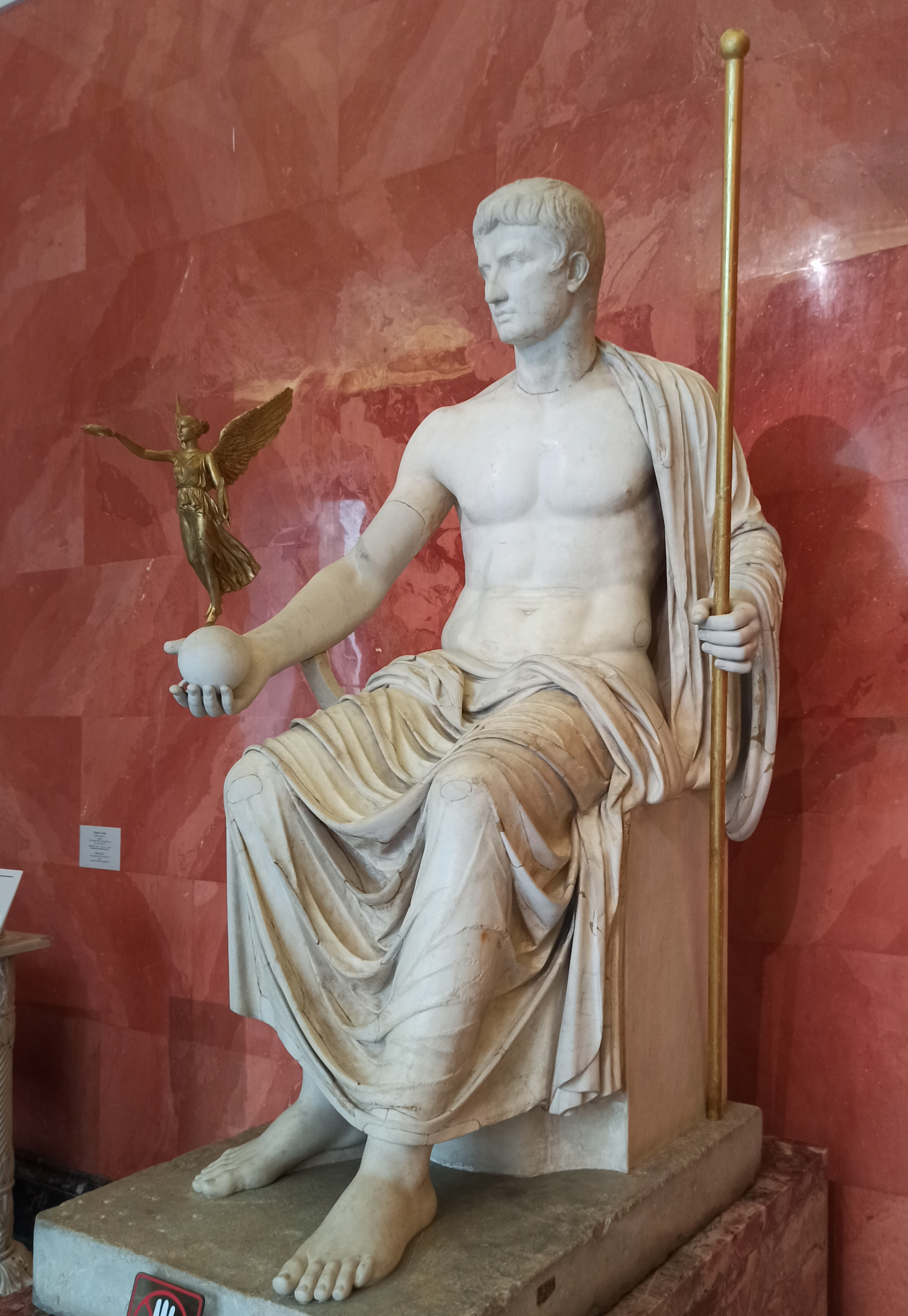
Augustus as Jupiter, holding a scepter and orb (first half of the 1st century AD)

The situation was so serious that Augustus appeared at the trial even though he had not been called as a witness. Under oath, Augustus declared that he gave no such order. Murena disbelieved Augustus's testimony and resented his attempt to subvert the trial by using his auctoritas. He rudely demanded to know why Augustus had turned up to a trial to which he had not been called; Augustus replied that he came in the public interest. Although Primus was found guilty, some jurors voted to acquit, meaning that not everybody believed Augustus's testimony, an insult to the 'August One'.

=== Greater proconsular authority ===
The second settlement was completed in part to allay confusion and formalize Augustus's legal authority to intervene in senatorial provinces. The Senate granted Augustus a form of general imperium proconsulare ('proconsular power') that applied throughout the empire, not solely to his provinces. Moreover, the Senate augmented Augustus's proconsular imperium into imperium proconsulare maius ('greater proconsular power'). This form of proconsular imperium was applicable throughout the empire and in effect gave Augustus constitutional power superior to all other proconsuls. Augustus stayed in Rome during the renewal process and provided veterans with lavish donations to gain their support, thereby ensuring that his status of proconsular imperium maius was renewed in 13 BC.

=== Additional powers ===
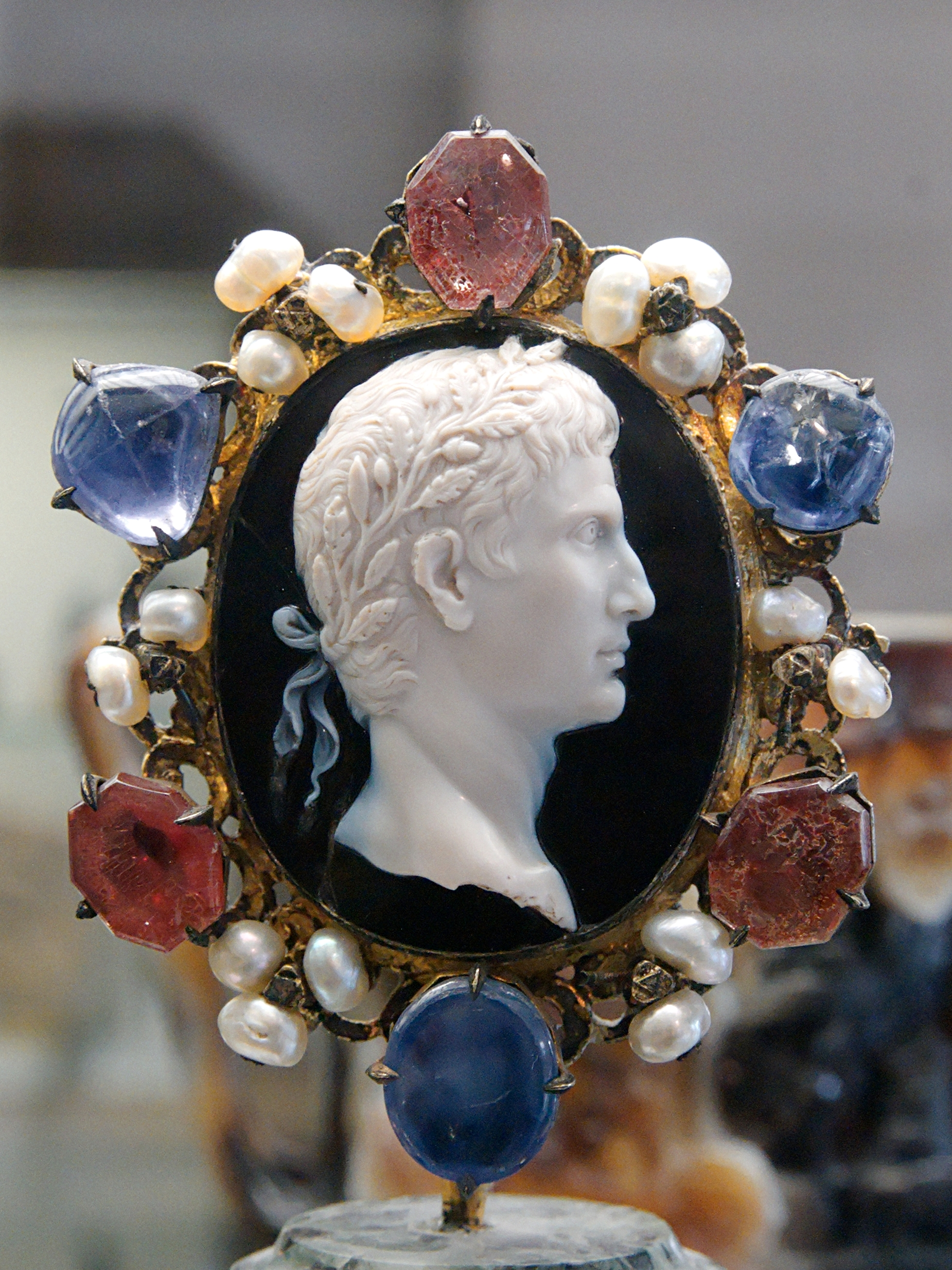
Portrait of Augustus. Sardonyx cameo; gilt silver mount with pearls, sapphires and red glass beads, 16th/17th centuries.

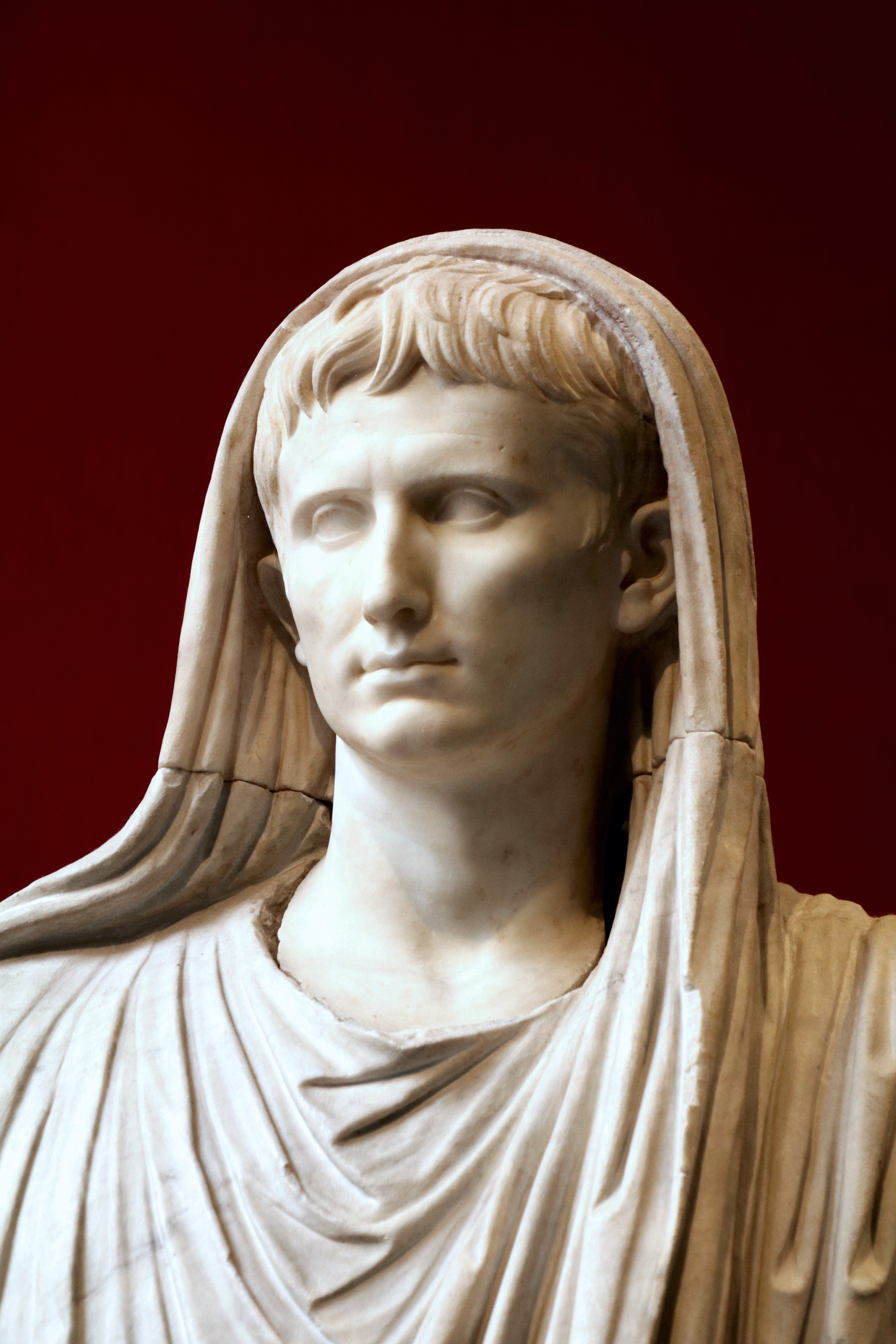
The head of the Via Labicana Augustus statue depicting the emperor as pontifex maximus, Roman artwork of the late Augustan period, last decade of the 1st century BC

=== Powers of the tribune ===
During the second settlement, Augustus was also granted the power of a tribune (tribunicia potestas) for life, though not the official title of tribune. For some years, Augustus had been awarded tribunicia sacrosanctitas, the immunity given to a tribune of the plebs. Now he decided to assume the full powers of the magistracy, renewed annually, in perpetuity. Legally, it was closed to patricians, a status that Augustus had acquired some years earlier when adopted by Julius Caesar. This power allowed him to convene the Senate and people at will and lay business before them, to veto the actions of either the Assembly or the Senate, to preside over elections, and to speak first at any meeting. The office of the tribunus plebis began to lose its prestige due to Augustus's amassing of tribunal powers, so he revived its importance by making it a mandatory appointment for any plebeian desiring the praetorship.

=== Powers of the censor ===
Also included in Augustus's tribunician authority were powers usually reserved for the Roman censor; these included the right to supervise public morals and scrutinize laws to ensure that they were in the public interest, as well as the ability to hold a census and determine the membership of the Senate. There was no precedent within the Roman system for combining the powers of the tribune and the censor into a single position, nor was Augustus ever elected to the office of censor. Julius Caesar had been granted similar powers, wherein he was charged with supervising the morals of the state. However, this position did not extend to the censor's ability to hold a census and determine the Senate's roster. Historian Walter Eder affirms that with the powers of censor, Augustus appealed to virtues of Roman patriotism by banning all attire but the classic toga while entering the Forum. However, Goldsworthy casts doubt on Dio's garbled claims about the censorship and many of these powers may actually have been temporary or simply refused by Augustus.

=== Imperium over the city of Rome ===
Augustus was granted sole imperium within the city of Rome in addition to being granted proconsular imperium maius and tribunician authority for life. Traditionally, proconsuls (Roman provincial governors) lost their proconsular imperium when they crossed the pomerium—the sacred boundary of Rome—and entered the city. In these situations, Augustus would have power as part of his tribunician authority, but his constitutional imperium within the pomerium would be less than that of a serving consul, which meant that when he was in the city he might not be the constitutional magistrate with the most authority. Thanks to his prestige or auctoritas, his wishes would usually be obeyed, but there might be some difficulty. To fill this power vacuum, the Senate voted that Augustus's imperium proconsulare maius (superior proconsular power) should not lapse when he was inside the city walls. All armed forces in the city had formerly been under the control of the urban praetors and consuls, but this situation now placed them under the sole authority of Augustus. It is unclear if this authority was granted fully by the Senate in 23 BC or later in a renewed grant of 19 BC, though Augustus did control the praetorian cohorts before 19 BC.

=== The Roman triumph ===
Credit was given to Augustus for every Roman military victory after 19 BC, because the majority of Rome's armies were stationed in imperial provinces commanded by Augustus through legati who were deputies of the princeps in the provinces. Moreover, if a battle was fought in a senatorial province, Augustus's proconsular imperium maius allowed him to take command of (or credit for) any major military victory. With few exceptions Augustus was the only individual who could receive a triumph, a tradition that allegedly began with legendary Romulus, Rome's first king and first triumphant general.

Licinius Crassus (grandson of the triumvir) was awarded a triumph for his victories in Thrace against the Germanic Bastarnae in 29–27 BC, but was denied other traditional honors. For celebrating his victory against the Garamantes in Roman Libya in 19 BC, Cornelius Balbus was the last person outside the family of Augustus to receive a triumph. Agrippa was awarded a triumph for his victories in Spain in 19 BC but he refused to celebrate it. Marcus Vipsanius Agrippa had also refused to celebrate a triumph during his consulship of 37 BC during the triumvirate, after he returned from Gaul in 38 BC. Ancient historians claim that this was a move to avoid highlighting recent failures by Octavian. Southern states that it is equally likely that "the refusal was part of Octavian's wish to limit the numbers of men who were permitted to hold a triumph to immediate family members. Generals parading to the Capitol in their triumphant garb might just start to develop ideas above their station". Tiberius, Augustus's eldest stepson by his wife Livia, received a triumph in 7 BC for victories in Germania in 8 BC, and again for victories in Illyria (Pannonia) in AD 9, celebrated in AD 12. For that campaign, his fellow commander Germanicus Julius Caesar was instead granted the ornamenta triumphalia ('triumphal honors'), a praetorship, and the ability to serve as a candidate for the consulship despite his young age.

=== Diplomacy ===
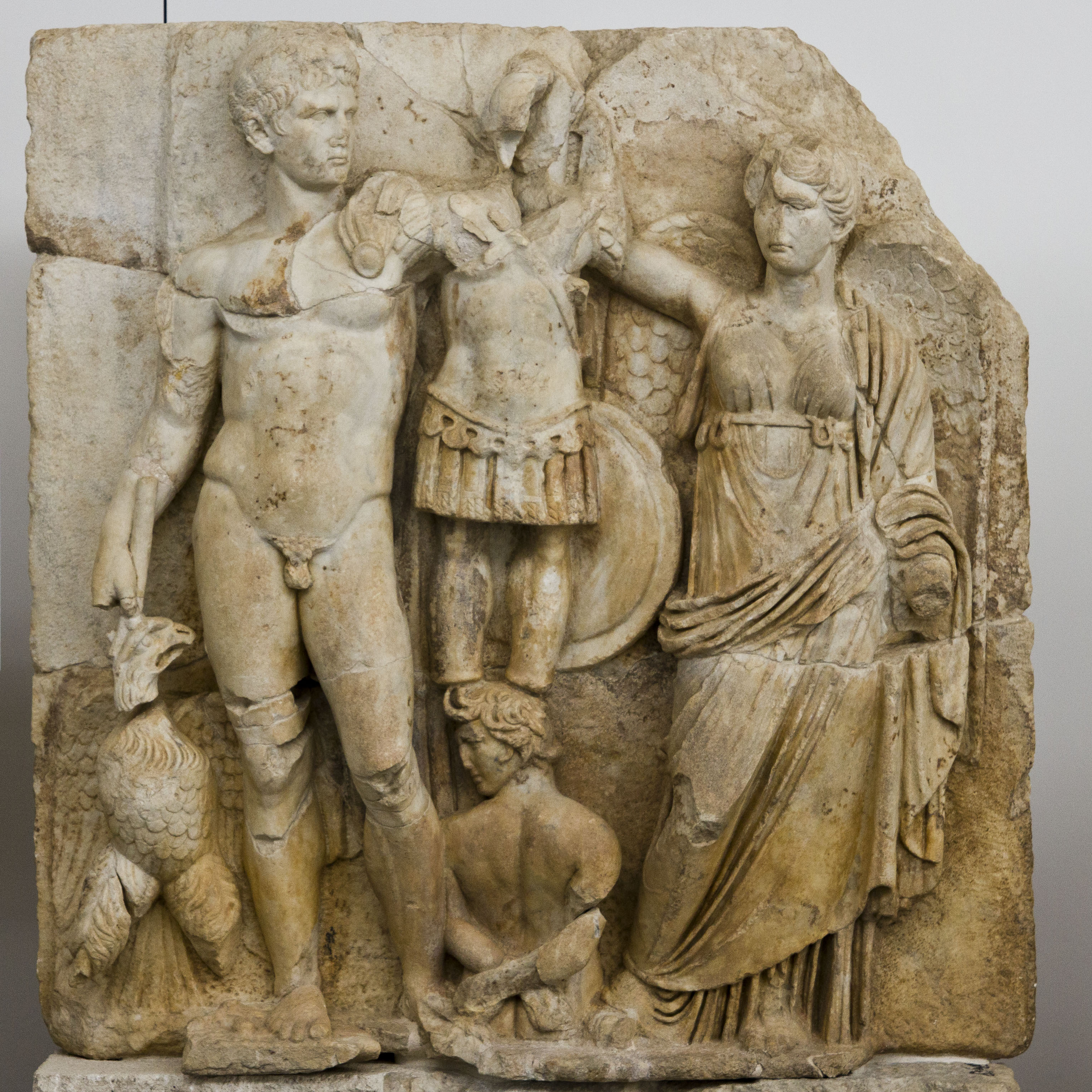
A Roman marble carved relief depicting a deified Augustus standing next to a tropaion ('trophy') crowned by goddess Victory, with an Eagle of Zeus perhaps symbolizing his consecration, dated to the reign of Tiberius (AD 14–37), from the Sebasteion of Aphrodisias, now in the Aphrodisias Museum (Turkey)

Augustus received emissaries from as far east as India, and his court included political exiles from as far north as the British Isles with the chieftains Dubnovellaunus and Tincomarus. Foreign embassies typically came to Augustus directly rather than to the Senate, though Augustus was careful to show respect to the Senate in certain cases. For instance, when the Parthians sent ambassadors to Augustus in 20 BC, he referred them to the Senate, but the latter sent them back to Augustus so they could negotiate solely with him instead. Petitions to Augustus from provinces and semi-autonomous municipalities were handled similarly to embassies of Roman client states and foreign countries, traveling to the court of the emperor as his administration moved to different locations across the Empire. In AD 8, the elderly Augustus assigned the exhausting work of managing foreign embassies to three ex-consuls, granting them the power to make all decisions that did not require serious debate in the Senate or oversight by the emperor.

The Roman historian Florus claimed that the silk-producing Seres, possibly the Han Chinese, visited the court of Augustus alongside diplomats from India. However, Augustus does not mention the Seres in his Res Gestae. The ancient Chinese historians do not mention any official attempts by the Han dynasty to establish contacts with Rome (referred to as Da Qin) before AD 97 when the military commander Ban Chao sent his ambassador Gan Ying on a diplomatic mission to Rome. However, Gan Ying never reached further west than the Persian Gulf under Parthian control.

== Conspiracy, titles, and the share of power ==
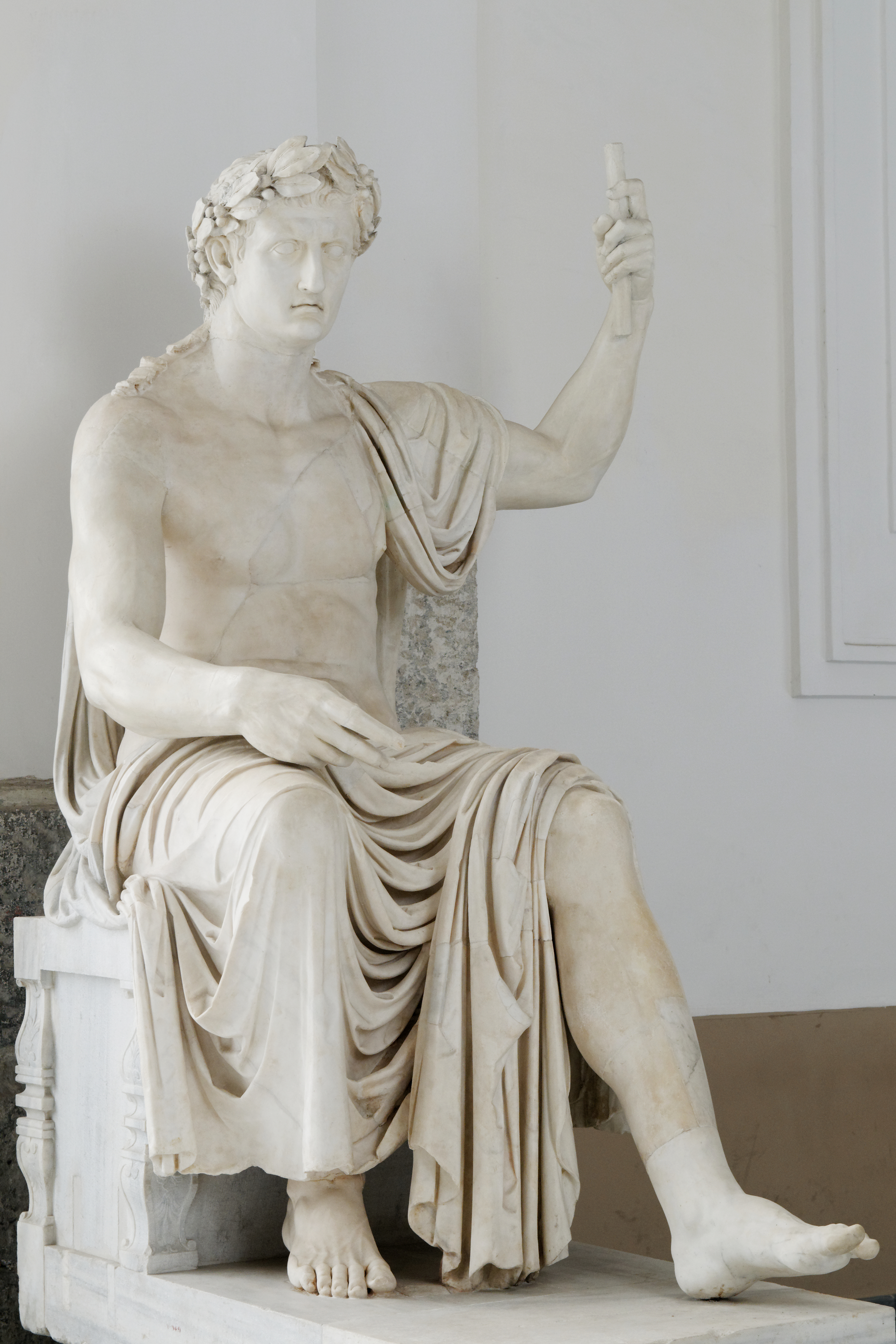
A colossal statue of Augustus from the Augusteum of Herculaneum, seated and wearing a laurel wreath

Many of the political subtleties of the second settlement seem to have evaded the comprehension of his supporters in the plebeian class, leading them to insist upon Augustus's participation in imperial affairs and form violent mobs on occasion. When Augustus refused to stand for election as consul in 22 BC and instead traveled to Sicily on yet another tour of the Empire, the Comitia centuriata voted in his absence to have him serve as co-consul for the following year, despite not being one of the candidates. A riot occurred in Rome when only a single consul Marcus Lollius assumed office on 1 January 21 BC and the factions of the two remaining candidates fought each other. Infuriated, Augustus summoned both candidates to Sicily, admonished them, had them banned from serving as candidates in future elections, and settled on having one of them serve out the year as co-consul. While there were contentious elections for the consulship, especially after Augustus resigned from the office in 23 BC, there is little evidence for candidates contesting the results of these elections after 19 BC.

A food shortage in Rome during 22 BC sparked widespread panic, as many urban plebs called for Augustus to take on dictatorial powers to personally oversee the crisis. After a theatrical display of refusal before the Senate, Augustus finally accepted authority over Rome's grain supply through the use of his existing proconsular imperium, and ended the crisis almost immediately. It was not until AD 8 that a food crisis of this sort prompted Augustus to establish a praefectus annonae, a permanent prefect who was in charge of procuring food supplies for Rome.

There were some who were concerned by the expansion of powers granted to Augustus by the second settlement, and this came to a head with the apparent conspiracy of Fannius Caepio. Some time prior to 1 September 22 BC, a certain Castricius provided Augustus with information about a conspiracy led by Fannius Caepio. Murena, the outspoken consul who defended Primus in the Marcus Primus affair, was named among the conspirators. The conspirators were tried in absentia with Tiberius acting as prosecutor; the jury found them guilty, but it was not a unanimous verdict. All the accused were sentenced to death for treason and executed as soon as they were captured—without ever giving testimony in their defense. Augustus ensured that the facade of Republican government continued with an effective cover-up of the events.

In 19 BC, the Senate granted Augustus a form of general consular imperium, which was probably imperium consulare maius, like the proconsular powers that he received in 23 BC. Like his tribune authority, the consular powers were another instance of gaining power from offices that he did not actually hold. This new grant in 19 BC also seems to have clarified the extent of his powers over Italy and the city of Rome, not just the provinces. In addition, Augustus was allowed to wear the consul's insignia in public and before the Senate, as well as to sit in the symbolic chair between the two consuls and hold the fasces, an emblem of consular authority. This seems to have assuaged the populace; regardless of whether or not Augustus was a consul, he appeared as one before the people and could exercise consular power if necessary.

On 6 March 12 BC, after the death of former triumvir Lepidus, Augustus took up the position of pontifex maximus, the high priest of the College of Pontiffs, the most important position in Roman religion. (Note: The date is provided by inscribed calendars. Dio reports this under 13 BC, probably as the year in which Lepidus died.) The Roman emperors after Augustus exclusively held the office of pontifex maximus until the fall of the Western Roman Empire, after which the papacy in Rome adopted the title. On 5 February 2 BC, Augustus was also given the title pater patriae ('father of the country'), which was then inscribed in various places in Rome such as the Senate chambers in the Forum Romanum.

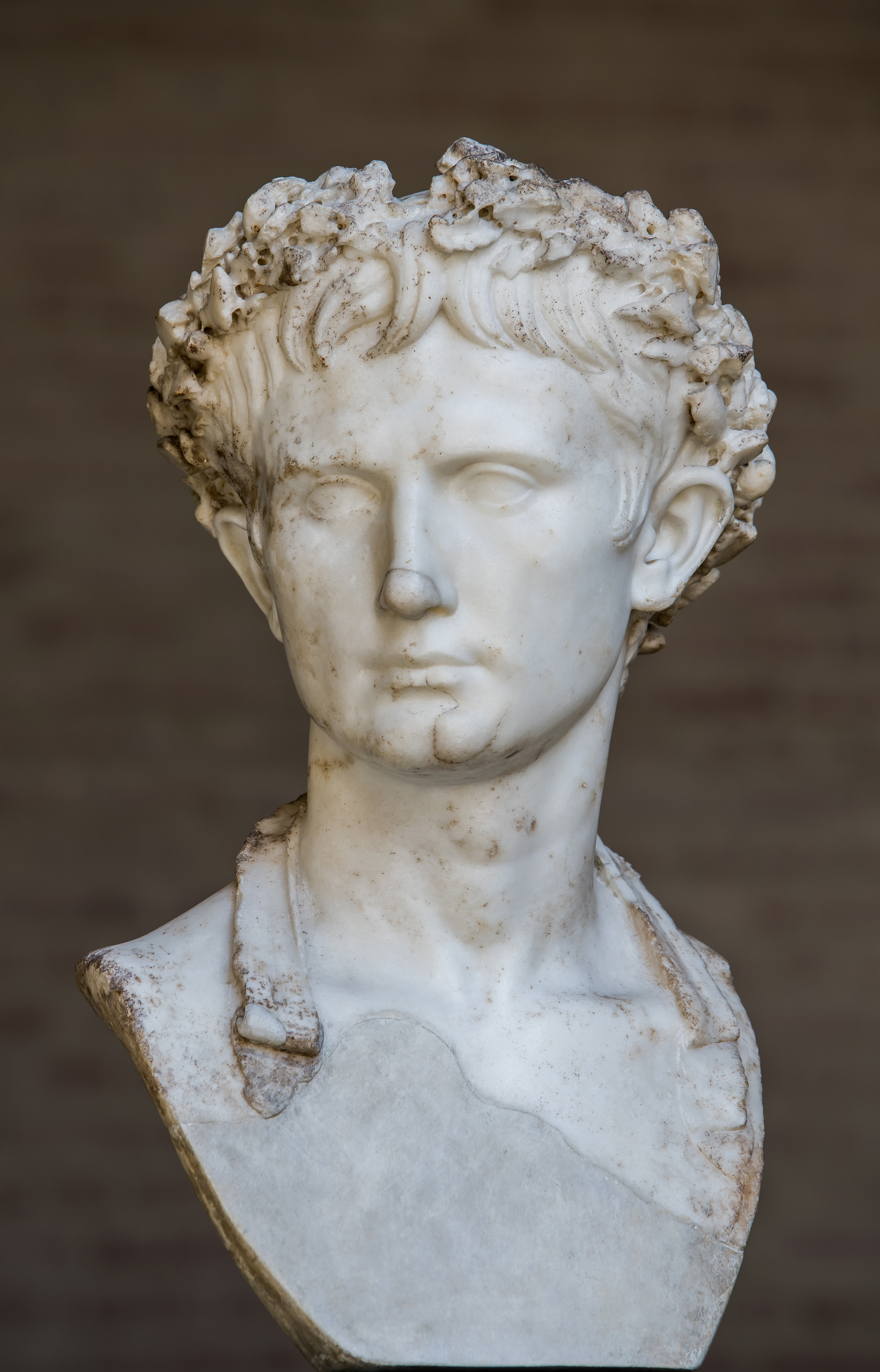
Bust of Augustus wearing the Civic Crown, at Glyptothek, Munich

In terms of principate constitutional stability, historian Ronald Syme wrote that if Augustus were to die from natural causes or fall victim to assassination, Rome could be subjected to another round of civil war, given the public memory of the Battle of Pharsalus, the Ides of March, the proscriptions, Philippi, and Actium. Possibly during the 20s BC and certainly by 18 BC, proconsular imperium was conferred upon Agrippa for five years, similar to Augustus's power, in order to accomplish this constitutional stability. The exact nature of the grant is uncertain but it probably covered Augustus's imperial provinces, east and west, perhaps lacking authority over the provinces of the Senate. Agrippa's authority, however, did not extend over Italy or the city of Rome. Like Augustus, Agrippa was also granted the powers of the tribunate.

== War and expansion ==
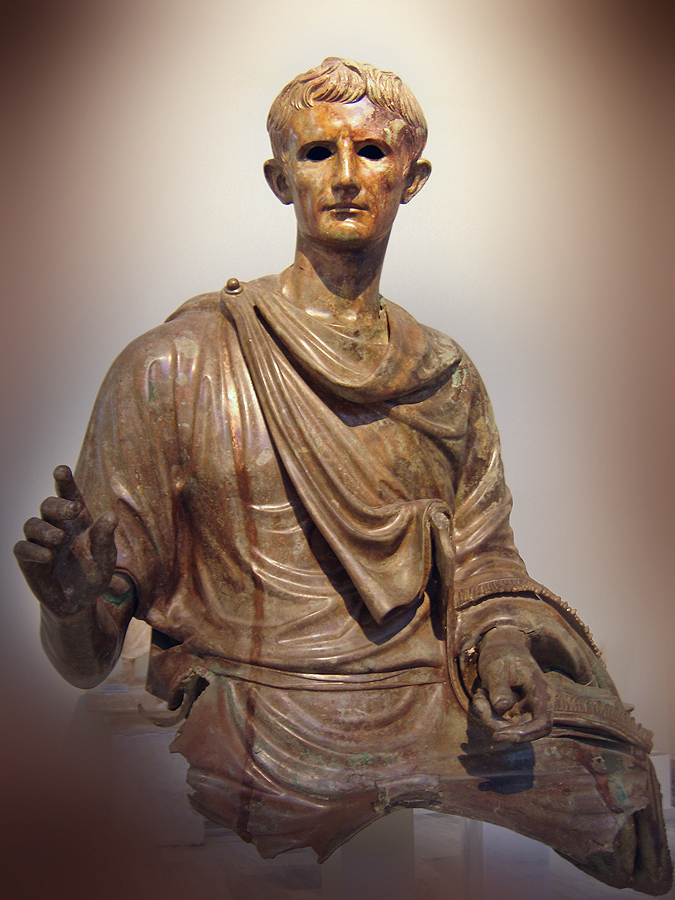
A fragment of an equestrian statue of Augustus, 1st century BC, National Archaeological Museum, Athens

By AD 13, Augustus boasted 21 occasions where his troops proclaimed him imperator after a successful battle. Almost the entire fourth chapter in his publicly released memoirs of achievements known as the Res Gestae is devoted to his military victories and honors. Augustus also promoted the ideal of a superior Roman civilization with a task of ruling the world (to the extent to which the Romans knew it), a sentiment embodied in words that the contemporary poet Virgil attributes to a legendary ancestor of Augustus: tu regere imperio populos, Romane, memento ('Roman, remember to rule the Earth's peoples with authority!'). The impulse for expansionism was apparently prominent among all classes at Rome, and it is accorded divine sanction by Virgil's Jupiter in Book 1 of the Aeneid, where Jupiter promises Rome imperium sine fine ('sovereignty without end'). Southern writes that this concept of imperium sine fine only came into doubt after the disastrous loss at the Battle of Teutoburg Forest in AD 9 and the withdrawal from Germania beyond the Rhine River, whereas the Romans had previously established their control as far as the Elbe River.

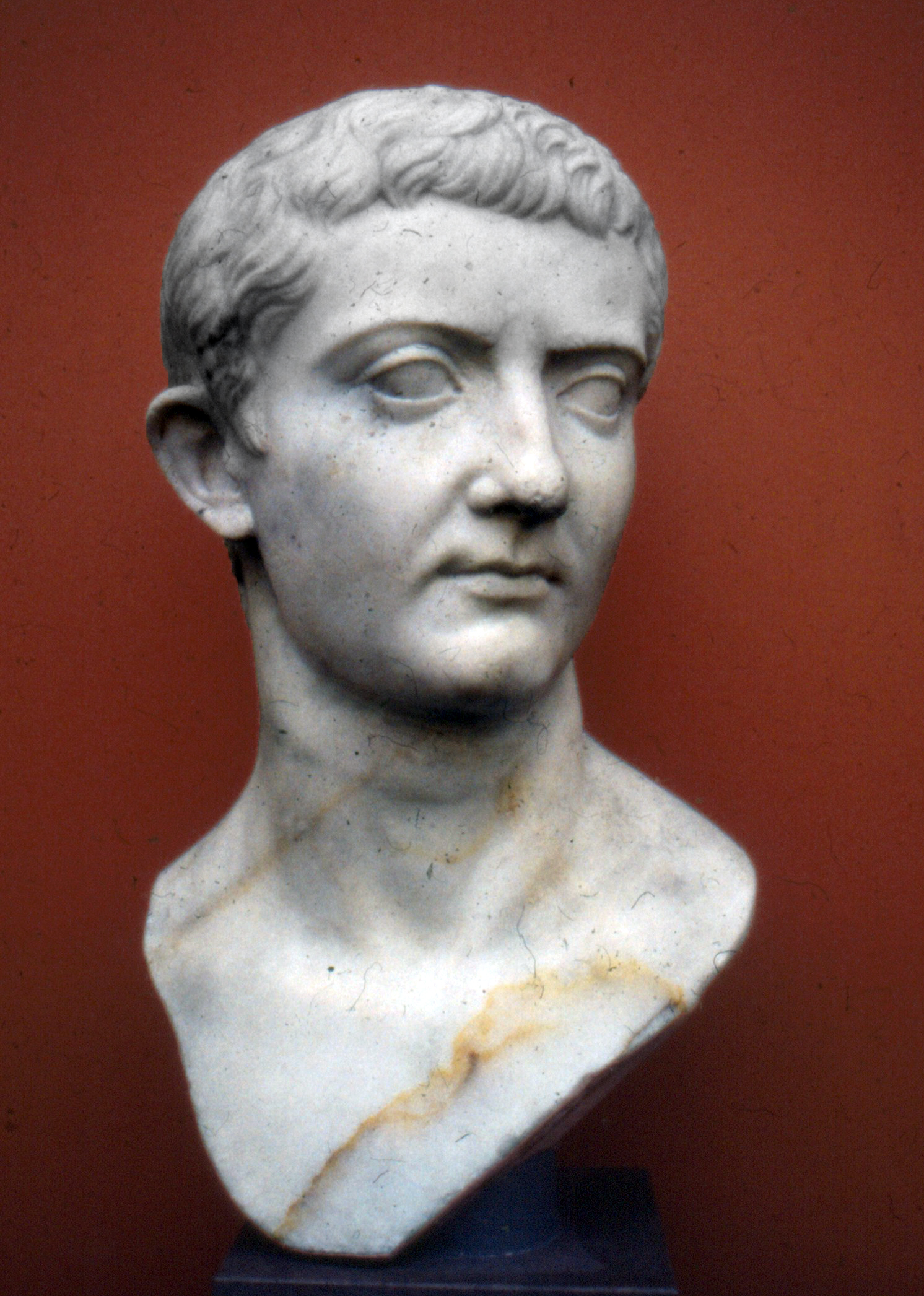
Bust of Tiberius, a successful military commander under Augustus who was designated as his heir and successor, Ny Carlsberg Glyptotek, Copenhagen

By the end of his reign, the armies of Augustus had conquered northern Hispania (modern Spain and Portugal) and the Alpine regions of Raetia and Noricum (modern Switzerland, Bavaria, Austria, Slovenia), Illyricum and Pannonia (modern Albania, Croatia, Hungary, Serbia, etc.), and had extended the borders of Africa Proconsularis to the east and south. Judea was added to the province of Syria when Augustus deposed Herod Archelaus, successor to client king Herod the Great. After Syria was assigned to Augustus by the Senate in 27 BC it was initially governed by legates under Agrippa, and then by a high prefect of the equestrian class rather than by a proconsul or legate of Augustus (much like Egypt after Antony). In AD 6 an equestrian governor was also appointed in Sardinia after pirate raids necessitated the presence of troops stationed there.

No military effort was needed in 25 BC when Galatia (part of modern Turkey) was converted to a Roman province shortly after Amyntas of Galatia was killed by an avenging widow of a slain prince from Homonada. The rebellious tribes of Asturias and Cantabria in modern-day Spain were finally quelled in 19 BC by Agrippa, and the territory fell under the provinces of Hispania and Lusitania. This region proved to be a major asset in funding Augustus's future military campaigns, as it was rich in mineral deposits that could be fostered in Roman mining projects, especially the very rich gold deposits at Las Médulas.

Conquering the peoples of the Alps in 15 BC after the disastrous defeat of Lollius in 17/16 BC was another important victory for Rome, (Note: Patricia Southern writes that there was a follow-up campaign in the Alps by Tiberius as late as 6 BC.) since it provided a large territorial buffer between the Roman citizens of Italy and Rome's enemies in Germania to the north. Horace dedicated an ode to the victory, while the monumental Trophy of Augustus was built in La Turbie near Monaco to honor the occasion. The capture of the Alpine region also served the next offensive in 12 BC, when Augustus's stepsons Tiberius and Drusus began the offensives against the Pannonian tribes of Illyricum and against the Germanic tribes of the eastern Rhineland respectively. Both campaigns were successful, as Drusus's forces reached the Elbe River by 9 BC—though he died shortly after from an injury sustained by falling off his horse. Tiberius rushed from Italy to Germany to see Drusus just before he died, and escorted his brother's body back to Rome, where he and Augustus provided eulogies for Drusus. After Illyrian tribes revolted in Illyricum in AD 6, their rebellion was quelled by forces under Tiberius and Germanicus in AD 9. This was the only major rebellion within Roman provincial territory since Augustus had become emperor, and by this point he had reduced the standing Roman army from roughly 500,000 soldiers during the civil wars down to 300,000 soldiers used primarily for foreign conquests.

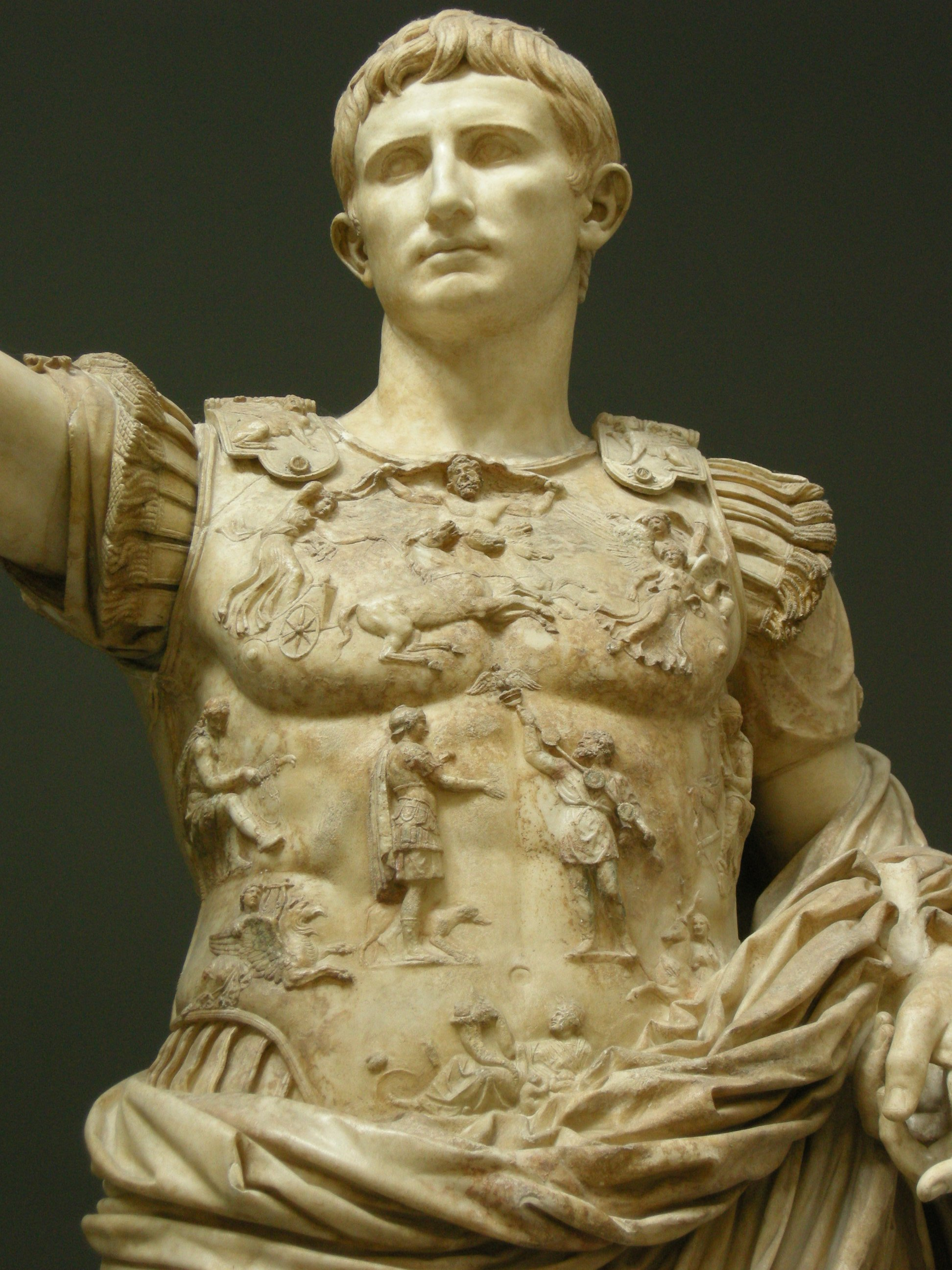
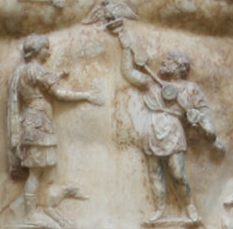
A close-up view of the breastplate on the statue of Augustus of Prima Porta, showing a Parthian man returning to Augustus the legionary standards lost by Marcus Licinius Crassus at Carrhae

To protect Rome's eastern territories from the Parthian Empire, Augustus relied on the client states of the east to act as territorial buffers and areas that could raise their own troops for defense. To ensure security of the empire's eastern flank, Augustus stationed a Roman army in Syria, while his skilled stepson Tiberius negotiated with the Parthians as Rome's diplomat to the East. Tiberius then restored Tigranes V to the throne of the Kingdom of Armenia in 20 BC, personally placing the crown on his head and replacing his brother Artavasdes IV as king.

Arguably Augustus's greatest diplomatic achievement was negotiating with Phraates IV of Parthia in 20 BC for the return of the battle standards lost by Crassus in the Battle of Carrhae, a symbolic victory and great boost of morale for Rome. Historians Werner Eck and Sarolta Takács claim that this was a great disappointment for Romans seeking to avenge Crassus's defeat by military means. However, Augustus used the return of the standards as propaganda symbolizing the submission of Parthia to Rome. The event was celebrated in art such as the breastplate design on the statue Augustus of Prima Porta and in monuments such as the Temple of Mars Ultor ('Mars the Avenger') built to house the standards. After Phraates V of Parthia managed to cleave Armenia away from Roman control, Augustus dispatched his grandson Gaius Caesar with an army to Syria in 1 BC, mounting a diplomatic pressure campaign that in AD 2 convinced Phraates V to concede to Roman demands.

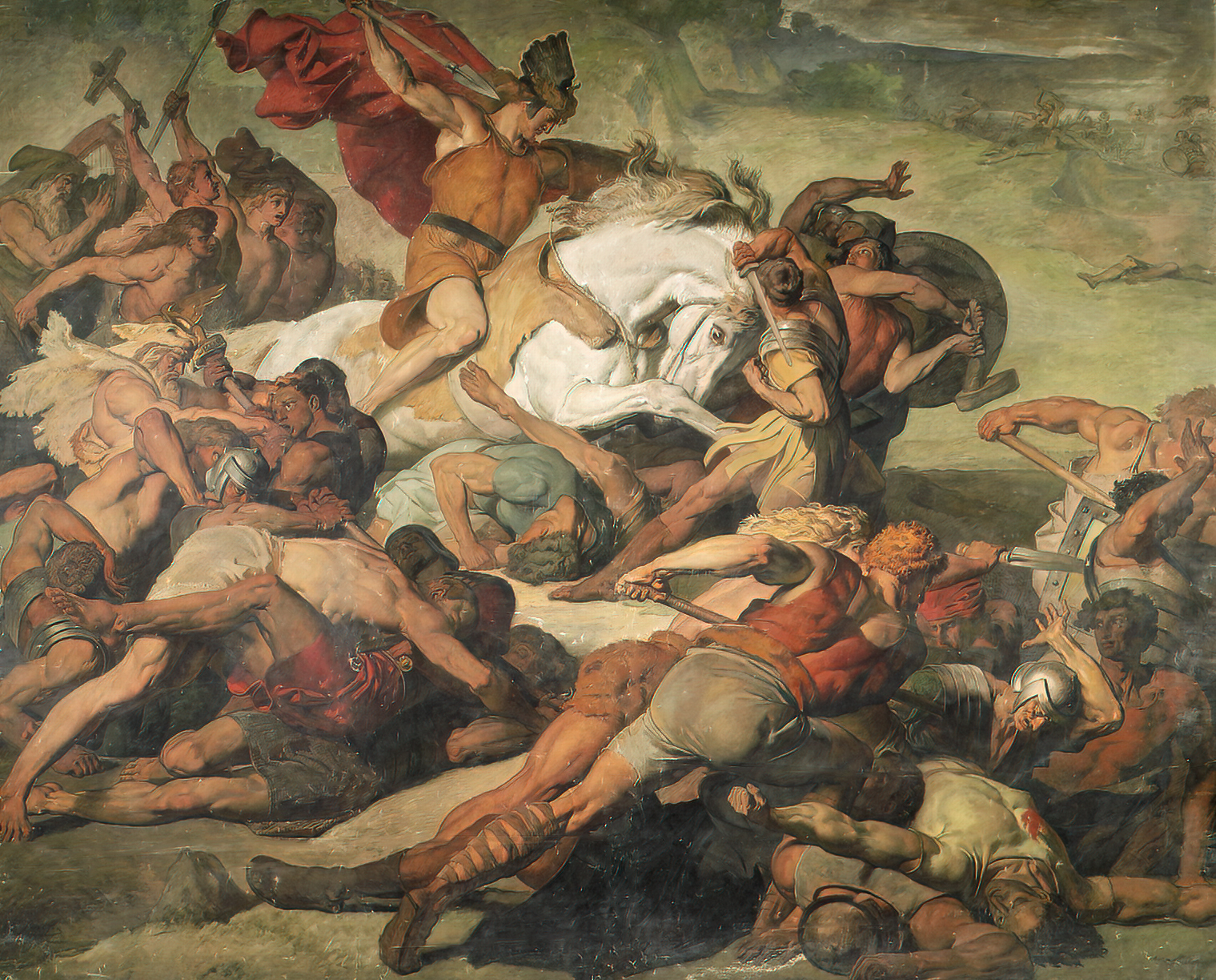
Der siegreich vordringende Hermann (The Victorious Advancing Hermann), depiction of the Battle of the Teutoburg Forest, by Peter Janssen, 1873

Parthia posed a threat to Rome in West Asia, but the more pressing concern was the battlefront along the Rhine and Danube rivers. Before the final fight with Antony, Octavian's campaigns against the tribes in Dalmatia were the first step in expanding Roman dominions to the Danube. Victory in battle was not always a permanent success, as newly conquered territories were constantly retaken by Rome's enemies in Germania. A prime example of Roman loss in battle was the Battle of the Teutoburg Forest in AD 9, where three entire legions led by Publius Quinctilius Varus were destroyed by Arminius, leader of the Cherusci, a Roman citizen and apparent Roman ally. Augustus retaliated by dispatching Tiberius and Drusus to the Rhineland to pacify it in AD 10 and AD 11, and these campaigns had some success. However, Augustus advised Tiberius against further conquests after the loss at Teutoburg, and the Romans abandoned expansion into Germany beyond the Rhine. Augustus lamented the loss, but it is glossed over entirely in his Res Gestae, which merely states that he pacified Germania up to the mouth of the Elbe. (Note: Historian Patricia Southern writes that "Tiberius retrieved the losses, remaining in Germania for another two years, in AD 10 watching in case the tribesmen penetrated to the Rhine and in AD 11 campaigning inside German territory — but not too far. Augustus wrote in the Res Gestae that he pacified Germany to the mouth of the Elbe, passing over in silence the losses of AD 9." Southern hints that "earlier versions of the Res Gestae, drafted before AD 9, would probably have stated 'I pacified Germany to the Elbe,' but after the disaster of Varus, the claims that German territory was overrun were reduced to the more modest 'to the mouth of the Elbe'. As for Augustus's territorial ambitions, Southern writes about his establishment of "an altar on the north bank" of the Elbe River in AD 1, and "perhaps at that date the concept of imperium sine fine was still valid, but whatever Augustus's initial intentions had been, dreams of conquest had faded. Augustus never recovered from the Varian disaster, and turned his back on expansion of the Empire. He was said to give vent to his feelings on occasion by shouting out loud, 'Quinctilius Varus, give me back my legions! and he certainly advised Tiberius not to attempt further conquests".) Under Augustus's successor Tiberius, Roman general Germanicus took advantage of a Cherusci civil war between Arminius and Segestes; at the Battle of Idistaviso in AD 16, he defeated Arminius.

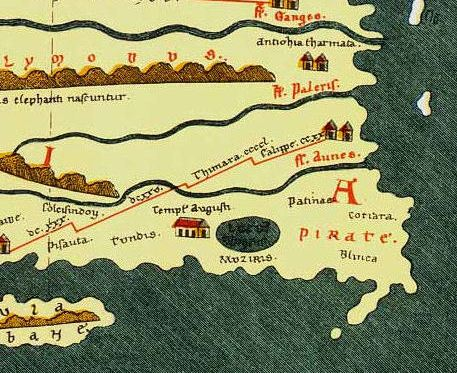
Muziris in the Chera Kingdom of Southern India, as shown in the Tabula Peutingeriana, with depiction of a temple of Augustus (Templum Augusti)

Rome also experienced loss to the south in Arabia Felix against the Kingdom of Saba (in modern Yemen). In 26 BC Augustus had Gaius Aelius Gallus, prefect of Egypt, invade South Arabia with Roman troops supported by Jewish and Nabataean Arab auxiliaries. They aimed to conquer the Sabaeans or force them to accept client state status so that Rome could gain a share of their profitable trade with India. Roman forces laid siege to Marib, but retreated to Hejaz (under allied Nabataean control) after a shortage of water supplies. Southern suggests that this campaign might have been part of a failed two-pronged assault to flank the Parthian Empire, considering how Augustus encouraged Tiridates II of Parthia to invade Mesopotamia and reclaim his throne the same year.

Gaius Petronius, who replaced Aelius Gallus as prefect of Egypt, was ordered by Augustus to invade Aethiopia, after Queen Amanirenas of the Kingdom of Kush (in modern Sudan) invaded Roman Egypt in 24 BC and sacked Aswan and Philae. The Romans counterattacked, sacking Napata in Nubia before withdrawing, but Amanirenas invaded Roman Egypt again in 22 BC and threatened Primis (modern Qasr Ibrim). Petronius bolstered its defenses and withstood a Kushite assault, after which Amanirenas sent diplomats to negotiate a favorable peace treaty with Augustus while he was on the island of Samos. The treaty established Maharraqa as the new border with Kush (previously set at Aswan), and lessened the amount of Roman tribute gathered from Kush. It also guaranteed peaceful trade relations between Roman Egypt and Nubia for the next three centuries. Rome had better fortunes further west in the Maghreb of North Africa, where Cossus Cornelius Lentulus put down a rebellion of the Gaetuli against Rome's Mauretanian client ruler Juba II in AD 6.

== Death and succession ==
The vague illness suffered by Augustus in 23 BC and his lifelong struggles with ill health brought the problem of succession to the forefront of political issues and the public. (Note: Adrian Goldsworthy notes the ongoing academic debate about the nature of Augustus's still uncertain health problems. Some scholars suggest it was even feigned, or that his condition was psychosomatic, but whatever the case, it affected his political career substantially, including his decision to search for an heir. Both Goldsworthy and Patricia Southern speculate that it involved issues with his liver.) To ensure stability, he needed to designate an heir to his unique position in Roman society and government. This was to be achieved in small, undramatic, and incremental ways that did not stir senatorial fears of monarchy. If someone was to succeed to Augustus's unofficial position of power, he would have to earn it through his own publicly proven merits.

=== The search for an heir ===
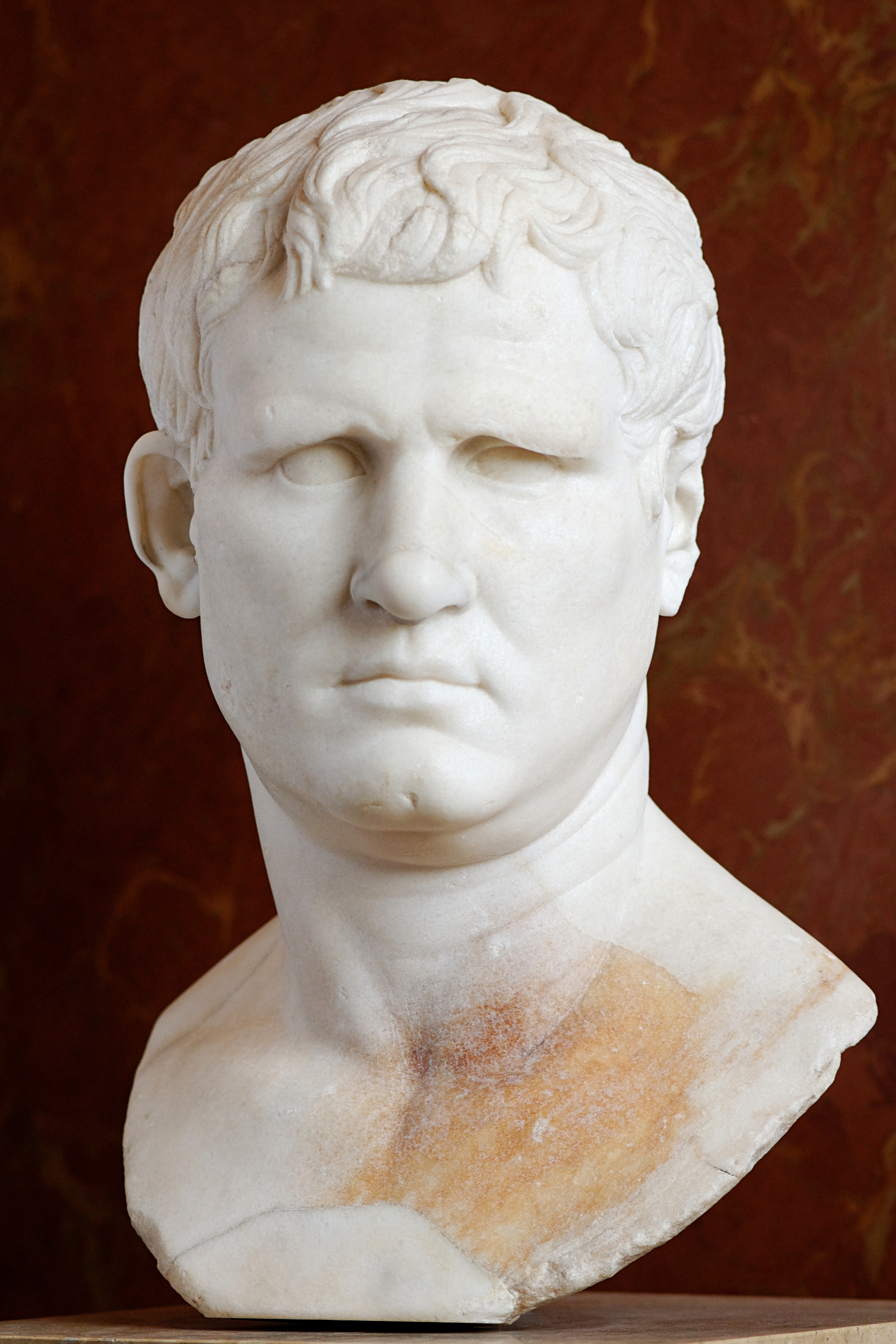
Left: A Roman bust of Julia the Elder, daughter of Augustus and wife of Marcellus, then Marcus Agrippa, and then Tiberius, housed in the Musée Saint-Raymond, France
Center: A Roman bust of Livia, wife of Augustus, mother of Tiberius and Drusus, Musée Saint-Raymond, France
Right: A Roman bust of Marcus Vipsanius Agrippa, son-in-law and confidant of Augustus, husband of Julia, the Louvre Museum, Paris, France

Some Augustan historians argue that indications pointed toward Marcellus, his sister Octavia's son who had been quickly married to Augustus's daughter Julia the Elder. Other historians dispute this due to the content of Augustus's will read aloud to the Senate while he was seriously ill in 23 BC. The will indicated a preference for Marcus Agrippa, who was Augustus's second in charge and arguably the only one of his associates who could have controlled the legions and held the empire together.

After the death of Marcellus in 23 BC, Augustus married his daughter Julia to Agrippa in 21 BC. This union produced five children, three sons and two daughters: Gaius Caesar, Lucius Caesar, Vipsania Julia, Agrippina, and Agrippa Postumus, so named because he was born after Marcus Agrippa died. In 18 BC (and perhaps also earlier), Agrippa was granted a five-year term of administering the eastern half of the empire with the imperium of a proconsul and the same tribunicia potestas granted to Augustus (although not trumping Augustus's authority), his seat of governance stationed at Samos in the eastern Aegean. This granting of power showed Augustus's favor for Agrippa, and upset some senators of the old aristocracy, but perhaps placated some members of the Caesarian party by allowing one of their members to share a considerable amount of power with Augustus.

Augustus's intent became apparent to make his grandsons Gaius and Lucius his heirs when he adopted them as his own children. He took the consulship in 5 BC and 2 BC so that he could personally usher them into their respective political careers. Gaius was nominated for the consulship of AD 1 after serving in the priesthood until age 21, deferred from 6 BC when at age 14 he was elected consul but deemed by Augustus to be too young to serve. (Note: Patricia Southern argues that Augustus was potentially testing the waters of public reaction to the 14-year-old Gaius Caesar winning the election as consul, having him wait until he was 21 years of age. Augustus insisted that this age was suitable enough, since Augustus had become consul at age 19 as Octavian, just before forming the triumvirate.) Lucius died before his designated consulship. Augustus also showed favor to his stepsons Drusus and Tiberius, Livia's children from her first marriage, granting them military commands and public office, though seeming to favor Drusus. After Agrippa died in 12 BC, Tiberius was ordered to divorce his own wife, Vipsania Agrippina, and marry Augustus's widowed daughter, Julia, as soon as a period of mourning for Agrippa had ended. Drusus's marriage to Augustus's niece Antonia was considered an unbreakable affair, whereas Vipsania, the daughter of the late Agrippa from his first marriage, was deemed less important.

=== Tiberius, heir to Augustus ===
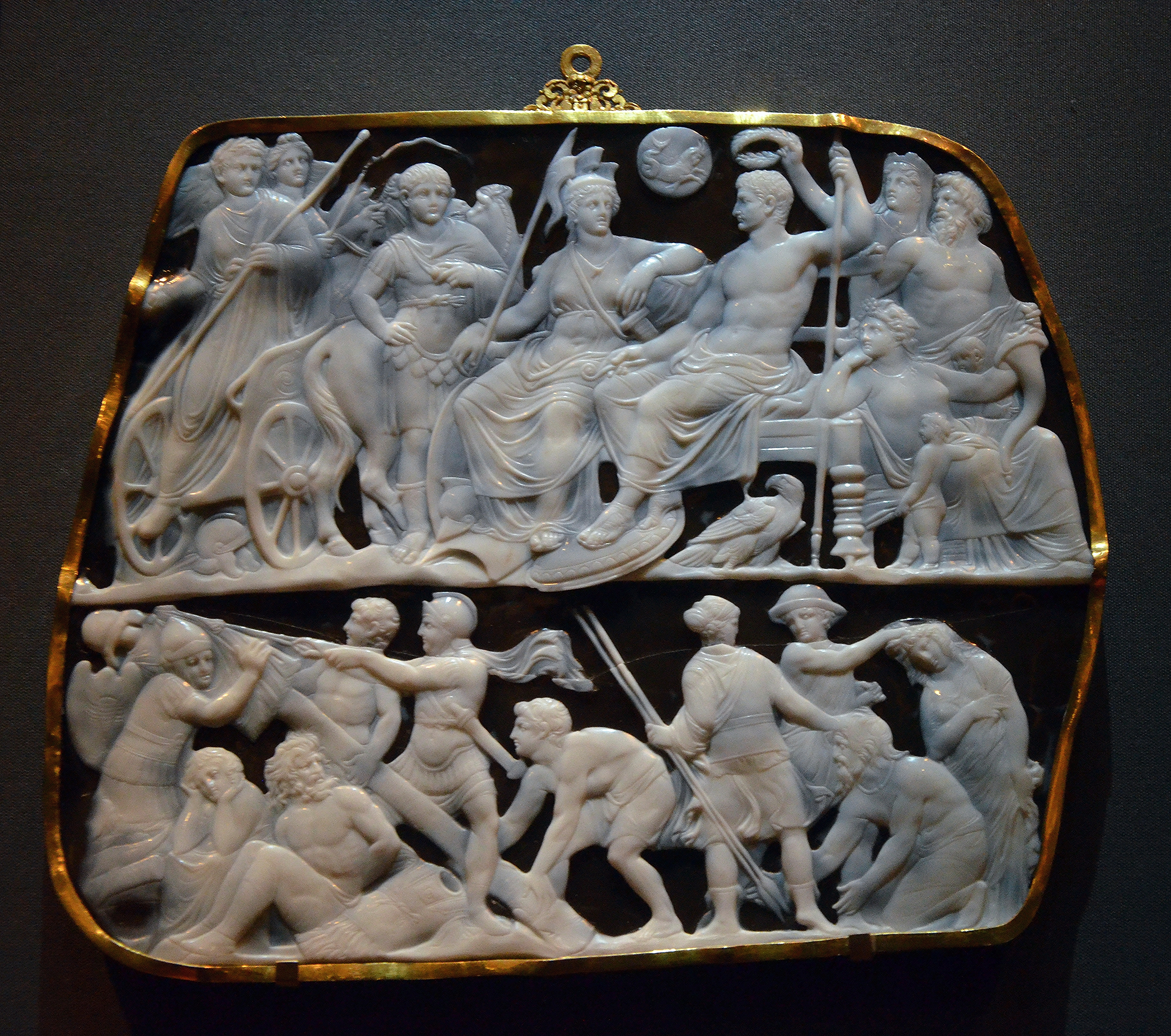
The Gemma Augustea, a two-layered sardonyx depicting Augustus seated next to the goddess Roma, with Augustus equated as Jupiter as he looks on at a figure riding in a chariot (likely his heir Tiberius celebrating his triumph for victories in Germania), 9–12 AD, Kunsthistorisches Museum, Vienna

Tiberius shared in Augustus's tribune powers as of 6 BC but shortly thereafter went into retirement, reportedly wanting no further role in politics while he exiled himself to Rhodes. No specific reason is known for his departure, though it could have been a combination of reasons, including his sense of envy and exclusion over Augustus's apparent favoring of the younger Gaius and Lucius. Gaius and Lucius joined the college of priests at an early age, were presented to spectators in a more favorable light, and were introduced to the army in Gaul. Tiberius's retirement to Rhodes could have also been caused by a failed marriage to Julia, who in 2 BC was banished to the island of Pandateria (modern Ventotene) by Augustus for committing adultery. In c. AD 8 Augustus had the poet Ovid exiled; Ovid suggested that this was in reprisal for writing the poem Ars Amatoria and making a mistake, perhaps being a witness to a sexual scandal involving either Augustus's daughter Julia the Elder or his granddaughter Julia the Younger.

After the deaths of both Lucius and Gaius in AD 2 and 4 respectively, and the earlier death of his brother Drusus (9 BC), Tiberius was recalled to Rome in June AD 4, where he was adopted by Augustus on the condition that he, in turn, adopt his nephew Germanicus. This continued the tradition of presenting at least two generations of heirs. In AD 4 Tiberius was also granted the powers of a tribune and proconsul, emissaries from foreign kings had to pay their respects to him, and he was eventually awarded with a triumph. In October AD 12 Tiberius was granted proconsular imperium over the entire empire and not just the western half where he had been campaigning in Germania, and in AD 13 he was granted an equal level of imperium with that of Augustus for a ten-year term. However, this authority did not apply to Rome and Italy, so a special law was required for passage in the Senate to allow Tiberius to jointly conduct the census with Augustus in Italy.

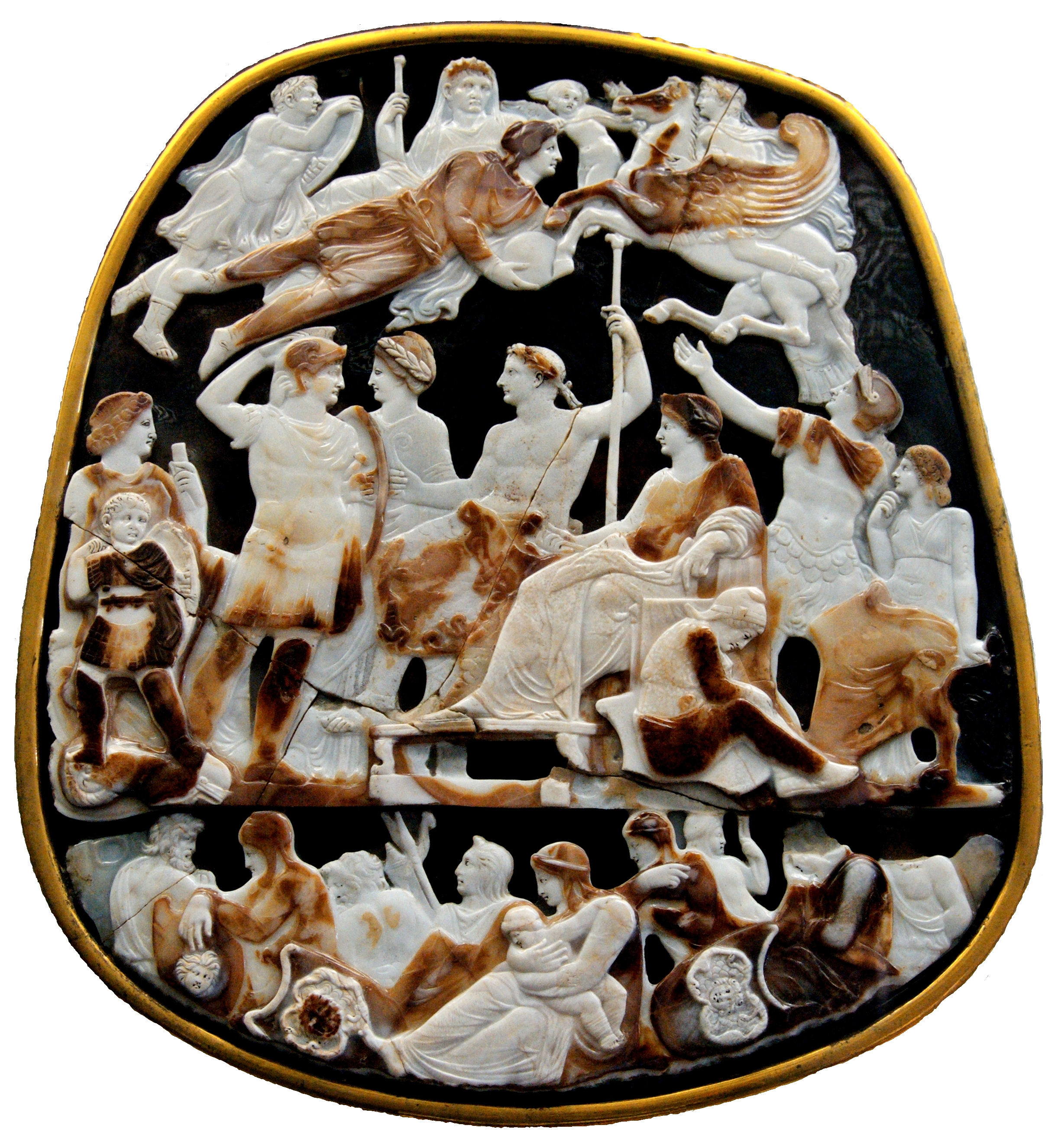
The deified Augustus hovers over Tiberius and other Julio-Claudians in the Great Cameo of France, 1st century AD

The only other possible claimant as heir was Agrippa Postumus. However, he had been exiled by Augustus to Sorrento in AD 6 and then to Planasia in AD 7. His banishment was made permanent by senatorial decree, and Augustus officially disowned him for his lack of good character and alleged involvement in a conspiracy. The historian Erich S. Gruen notes various contemporary sources that state Agrippa Postumus was a "vulgar young man, brutal and brutish, and of depraved character". After Tiberius succeeded Augustus, he was most likely the one who had Agrippa killed in exile.

=== Death of Augustus ===
On 19 August AD 14, Augustus died while visiting Nola, where his father had died. Both Tacitus and Cassius Dio wrote that Livia was rumored to have brought about Augustus's death by poisoning fresh figs. This element features in many modern works of historical fiction pertaining to Augustus's life, but some historians view it as likely to have been a salacious fabrication made by those who had favored Postumus as heir, or other political enemies of Tiberius. Livia had long been the target of similar rumors of poisoning on the behalf of her son, most or all of which are unlikely to have been true. Alternatively, it is possible that Livia did supply a poisoned fig (she did cultivate a variety of fig named for her that Augustus is said to have enjoyed), but did so as a means of assisted suicide rather than murder. Augustus's health had been in decline in the months immediately before his death, and he had made significant preparations for a smooth transition in power, having at last reluctantly settled on Tiberius as his choice of heir. It is likely that Augustus was not expected to return alive from Nola, but it seems that his health improved once there; it has therefore been speculated that Augustus and Livia conspired to end his life at the anticipated time, having committed to the succession of Tiberius, in order not to endanger that transition of power.

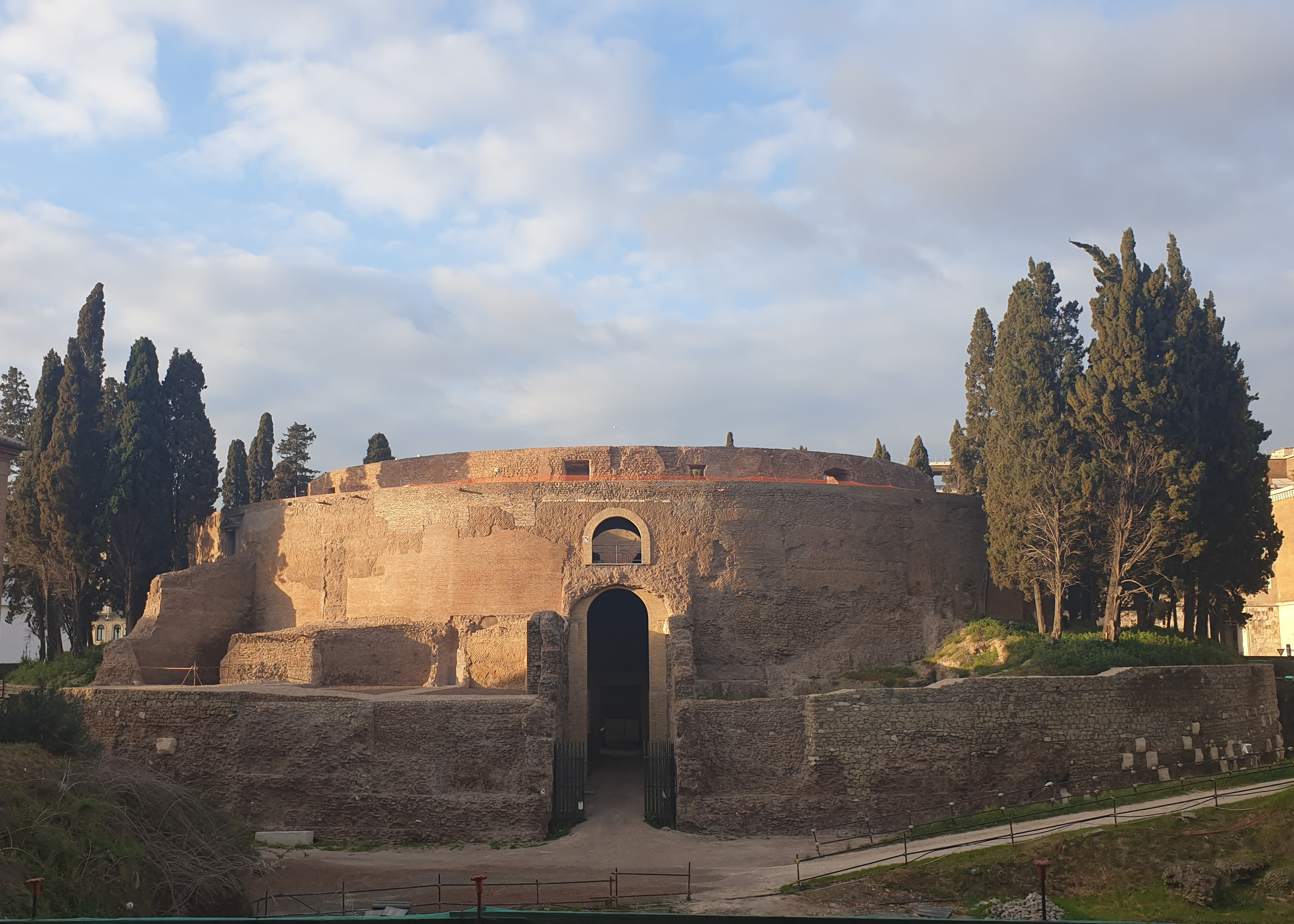
The Mausoleum of Augustus restored, 2021

Augustus's famous last words were, "Have I played the part well? Then applaud as I exit" (Acta est fabula, plaudite)—referring to the play-acting and regal authority that he had put on as emperor. An enormous funerary procession of mourners travelled with Augustus's body from Nola to Rome, and all public and private businesses closed on the day of his burial. Tiberius and his son Drusus delivered the eulogy while standing atop two rostra. Augustus's body was coffin-bound and cremated on a pyre close to his mausoleum. Tiberius succeeded Augustus as emperor in AD 14, though there was no clear legal framework for successions of Roman emperors until Vespasian. (Note: At this stage there was no explicit outline in Roman law for the succession of Roman emperors or who could become princeps, which became starkly clear with the fall of the Julio-Claudian dynasty. Afterwards, Vespasian established a legal basis for his succession by listing the offices and powers he inherited from Augustus, Tiberius, and Claudius in the lex quae dicitur de imperio Vespasiani.)

=== Deification ===
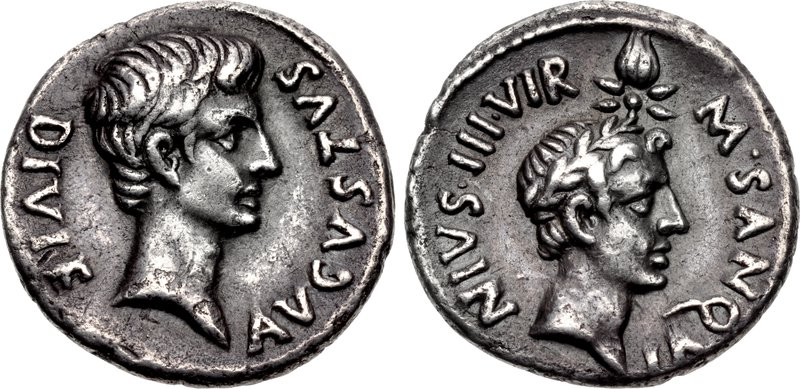
A denarius coin of Augustus struck at Rome in 17 BC depicting Augustus on the obverse and the deified Julius Caesar beneath Caesar's comet on the reverse

On 17 September 27 BC Augustus was proclaimed by the Senate to have joined the company of the gods and his adoptive father Julius Caesar as a member of the Roman pantheon. (Note: Julius Caesar was granted divine honors during his lifetime, but his posthumous deification and cult of Divus Julius were not established until the ratification of the lex Rufrena in 42 BC. Claims of divine ancestry were commonly promoted by aristocratic Roman families. For instance, Julius Caesar claimed to have descent from the goddess Venus. During the triumvirate, Mark Antony was viewed by many people living in eastern provinces as a divine figure akin to the demigod Hercules, if not Dionysus. Octavian conveniently claimed descent from a divine being simply by being the adopted son of Julius Caesar, with the public memory of the latter's dictatorship gradually obscured by his worship as a revered god, especially by the time Augustan literature was established.) People in Rome's eastern provinces had worshipped him as a living deity since his victory at Actium. There was even limited worship of him as a living god in some of Rome's western provinces, primarily at Lugdunum (the Sanctuary of the Three Gauls in modern Lyon, France) and Oppidum Ubiorum (the Ara Ubiorum in modern Cologne, Germany), (Note: Historian Patricia Southern writes that "In Rome and the west the process was slower to develop. Rome was a more sensitive area, where proclaiming oneself a god was not the wisest of courses to follow." Southern continues by explaining that the "worship of Augustus as a living god seems to have been more acceptable in the western provinces than it was in Rome itself. Altars were dedicated to him as a god during his lifetime in some provinces." Southern insists that "temples were established to Augustus himself, and not just to his genius alone," and that the "eastern provinces were all used to this concept, but the western provinces were virgin territories" for these religious beliefs. Southern contends that for Rome's western provinces, the "ruler cult had to be manufactured there, and was concentrated on specific sites. At the two main sites there was an open-air sanctuary and an altar but no actual temple; the Altar of the Three Gauls was established at Lugdunum, and the Altar of the Ubii at Cologne on the Rhine. An altar to Augustus was set up on the north bank of the Elbe in AD 1, though it was presumably not a long-lived affair after the withdrawal from Germany.") but not in Rome itself where this claim was highly taboo during his reign. Only his genius (spirit or general divine nature) was allowed worship there.

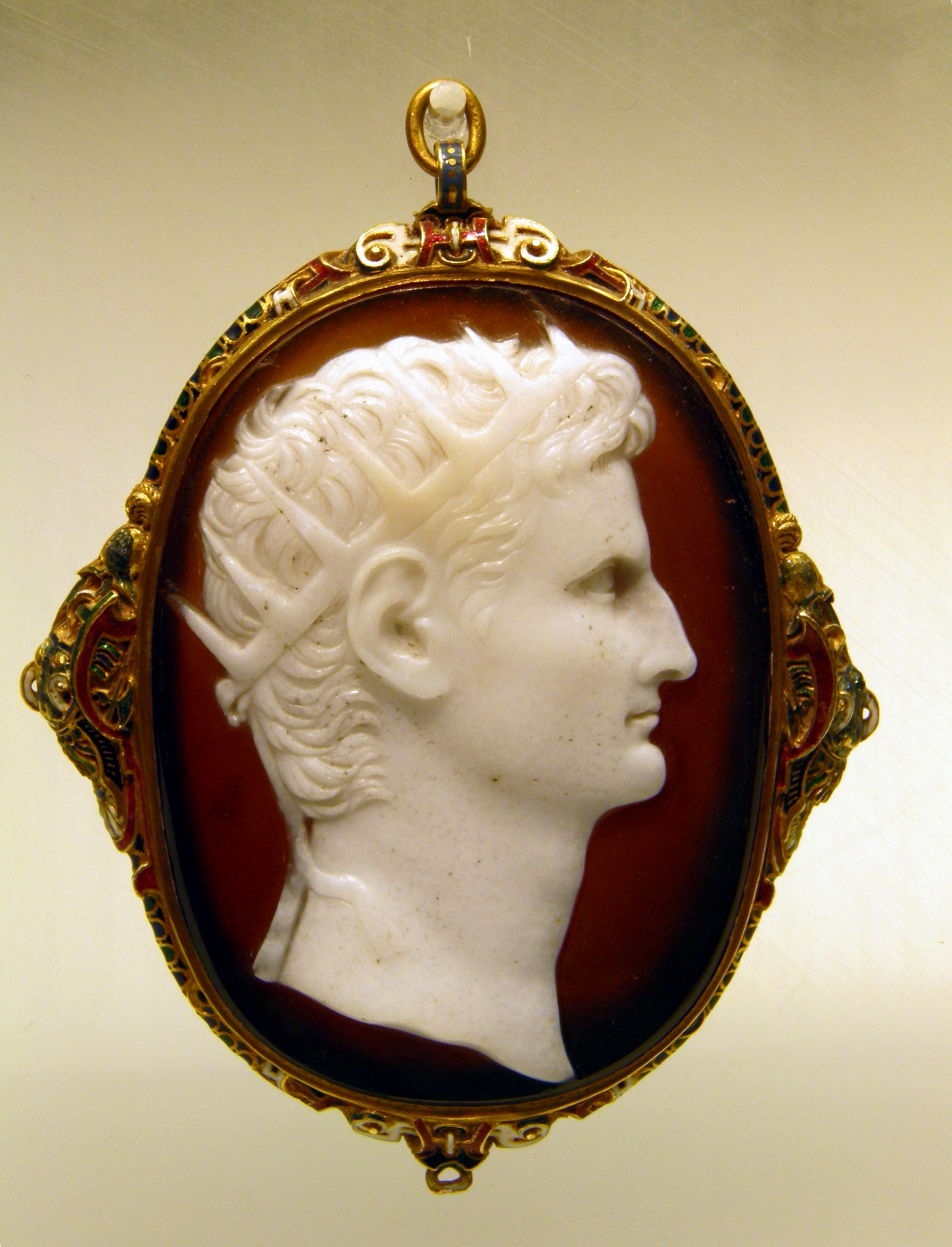
A cameo carving depicting the deified Augustus with the radiate crown of the sun god, 1st century AD

Historian D. C. A. Shotter states that Augustus's policy of favoring the Julian family line over the Claudian might have afforded Tiberius sufficient cause to show open disdain for Augustus after the latter's death; instead, Tiberius was always quick to rebuke those who criticized Augustus. Shotter suggests that Augustus's deification obliged Tiberius to suppress any open resentment that he might have harbored, coupled with Tiberius's "extremely conservative" attitude towards religion. Also, historian R. Shaw-Smith points to letters of Augustus to Tiberius which display affection towards Tiberius and high regard for his military merits. Shotter states that Tiberius focused his anger and criticism on Gaius Asinius Gallus (for marrying Vipsania after Augustus forced Tiberius to divorce her), as well as toward the two young Caesars, Gaius and Lucius—instead of Augustus, the real architect of his divorce and imperial demotion.

== See also ==
- Augustan and Julio-Claudian art
- Augustan literature (ancient Rome)
- Early life of Augustus
- Gaius Maecenas
- Julio-Claudian family tree
- Julius Licinus
- Rise of Augustus
- Temple of Augustus

== Sources ==
=== Ancient sources ===
- Appian. Bella civilia.
  - McGing, B. C. (2020). Appian: Roman History. Loeb Classical Library. Vol. IV–VI. Harvard University Press. ISBN 978-0-674-99647-2.
  - White, Horace (1913–14). Loeb Classical Library – via LacusCurtius.
- Augustus. Res Gestae Divi Augusti.
  - Cooley, Alison E. (2009). Res Gestae Divi Augusti: Text, Translation, and Commentary. Cambridge University Press. ISBN 978-0-521-84152-8.
  - Shipley, Frederick W. (1924). Loeb Classical Library – via LacusCurtius.
- Cicero. Epistulae ad Atticum.
  - Shackleton-Bailey, D. R. (1999). Loeb Classical Library. 4 volumes.
- Dio. Historia Romana.
  - Cary, Earnest (1914–27). Loeb Classical Library – via LacusCurtius.
- Florus. Epitomae.
- Livy. Periochae.
  - Lendering, Jona. (2003). Livius.org.
  - Schlesinger, Alfred C. (1959). Loeb Classical Library.
- Nicolaus Damascenus. Life of Augustus.
  - Toher, Mark (2017). Nicolaus of Damascus: the life of Augustus and the autobiography texts, translations and historical commentary. Cambridge University Press. ISBN 978-1-107-07561-0.
  - Hall, Clayton M. (1923). Northampton – via CSUN.edu. Archived 2007-07-14 at the Wayback Machine.
- Suetonius. Augustus.
  - Wardle, D. (2014). Life of Augustus: Vita divi Augusti. Oxford University Press. ISBN 978-0-19-968645-2.
  - Rolfe, J. C. (1913–14). Loeb Classical Library – via LacusCurtius
- Tacitus. Annales.
  - Woodman, A. J. (2004). The Annals. Indianapolis: Hackett. ISBN 978-0-87220-559-8.
  - Jackson, J. (1931–37). Loeb Classical Library – via LacusCurtius
- Velleius Paterculus. Historia Romana.
  - Woodman, A. J. (2025). Velleius Paterculus. Loeb Classical Library. Harvard University Press.
  - Shipley, Frederick W. (1924). Loeb Classical Library – via LacusCurtius.

=== Modern sources ===
- Chaniotis, Angelos (2018). Age of Conquests: The Greek World from Alexander to Hadrian. Cambridge: Harvard University Press. ISBN 9780674659643.
- Ando, Clifford (2000). Imperial Ideology and Provincial Loyalty in the Roman Empire. Berkeley, Los Angeles and London: University of California Press. ISBN 978-0-520-28016-8.
- Beard, Mary (2021). Twelve Caesars: Images of Power from the Ancient World to the Modern. Princeton, New Jersey: Princeton University Press. ISBN 9780691222363.
- Bivar, A. D. H. (1983). "The Political History of Iran Under the Arsacids". In Yarshater, Ehsan (ed.). The Cambridge History of Iran. Vol. 3. London, New York, New Rochelle, Melbourne, and Sydney: Cambridge University Press. pp. 21–99. ISBN 978-0-521-20092-9.
- Bowersock, G. W. (1983). Roman Arabia. Cambridge: Harvard University Press. ISBN 0-674-77755-7.
- Bowersock, G. W. (1990). "The Pontificate of Augustus". In Raaflaub, Kurt A.; Toher, Mark (eds.). Between Republic and Empire: Interpretations of Augustus and his Principate. Berkeley: University of California Press. pp. 380–394. ISBN 978-0-520-08447-6.
- Bringmann, Klaus (2007) [2002]. A History of the Roman Republic. Translated by Smyth, W. J. Cambridge: Polity. ISBN 978-0-7456-3371-8.
- Brizzi, Giovanni (2022). "D'un anniversaire à l'autre: Auguste et la notion de pax entre Fascisme et époque moderne". In Cavalieri, Marco; Assenmaker, Pierre; Cavagna, Mattia; Engels, David (eds.). Augustus through the Ages: Receptions, Readings and Appropriations of the Historical Figure of the First Roman Emperor. Collection Latomus (in French). Vol. 366. Brussels: Peeters Publishers. pp. 35–50. doi:10.2307/jj.10574832.4. ISBN 978-90-429-4962-1.
- Brosius, Maria (2006). The Persians: An Introduction. London & New York: Routledge. ISBN 978-0-415-32089-4.
- Bunson, Matthew (1994). Encyclopedia of the Roman Empire. New York: Facts on File. ISBN 978-0-8160-3182-5.
- Burstein, Stanley M. (2004). The Reign of Cleopatra. Westport, Connecticut: Greenwood Press. ISBN 978-0-313-32527-4.
- Cadario, Matteo (2022). "Alcune osservazioni sulla memoria postuma di Augusto nelle immagini". In Cavalieri, Marco; Assenmaker, Pierre; Cavagna, Mattia; Engels, David (eds.). Augustus through the Ages: Receptions, Readings and Appropriations of the Historical Figure of the First Roman Emperor. Collection Latomus (in Italian). Vol. 366. Brussels: Peeters Publishers. pp. 53–78. doi:10.2307/jj.10574832.4. ISBN 978-90-429-4962-1.
- Claes, Liesbeth (2022). "Augustan Images of Legitimacy: The Numismatic Memory of Augustus (AD 14-268)". In Cavalieri, Marco; Assenmaker, Pierre; Cavagna, Mattia; Engels, David (eds.). Augustus through the Ages: Receptions, Readings and Appropriations of the Historical Figure of the First Roman Emperor. Collection Latomus. Vol. 366. Brussels: Peeters Publishers. pp. 79–106. doi:10.2307/jj.10574832.4. ISBN 978-90-429-4962-1.
- Cotton, Hannah M.; Yakobson, Alexander (2002). "Arcanum Imperii: the Powers of Augustus". In Clar, Gillian; Rajak, Tessa (eds.). Philosophy and Power in the Graeco-Roman World: Essays in Honour of Miriam Griffin. Oxford: Oxford University Press. pp. 193–210. ISBN 0-19-8-29990-7.
- Davies, Mark (2010). Aspects of Roman History 82 BC–AD 14. London and New York: Routledge. doi:10.4324/978020385665. ISBN 978-0-203-85665-9.
- Drogula, Fred K. (2015). Commanders & Command in the Roman Republic and Early Empire. Chapel Hill: University of North Carolina Press. ISBN 978-1-4696-2126-5.
- Eck, Werner; Takács, Sarolta A. (2003). The Age of Augustus. Translated by Schneider, Deborah Lucas (first ed.). Oxford: Blackwell Publishing. ISBN 0-631-22957-4.
- Eck, Werner; Takács, Sarolta A. (2007) [2003]. The Age of Augustus. Translated by Schneider, Deborah Lucas (second ed.). Oxford: Blackwell Publishing. ISBN 978-1-4051-5149-8.
- Eder, Walter (2005). "Augustus and the Power of Tradition". In Galinsky, Karl (ed.). The Cambridge Companion to the Age of Augustus. Cambridge Companions to the Ancient World. Cambridge and New York: Cambridge University Press. pp. 13–32. ISBN 978-0-521-80796-8.
- Fishwick, Duncan (2004). The Imperial Cult in the Latin West III, Part 3. Leiden: Brill. p. 250. ISBN 978-90-474-1276-2.
- Galinsky, Karl (2012). Augustus: Introduction to the Life of an Emperor. New York: Cambridge University Press. ISBN 978-0-521-74442-3.
- Goldsworthy, Adrian (2014). Augustus: First Emperor of Rome. New Haven: Yale University Press. ISBN 978-0-300-17827-2.
- Gruen, Erich S. (2005). "Augustus and the Making of the Principate". In Galinsky, Karl (ed.). Cambridge Companion to the Age of Augustus. Cambridge Companions to the Ancient World. Cambridge, MA; New York: Cambridge University Press. pp. 33–52. ISBN 978-0-521-80796-8.
- Hammond, Mason (1957). "Imperial Elements in the Formula of the Roman Emperors during the First Two and a Half Centuries of the Empire". Memoirs of the American Academy in Rome. 25: 17–64. JSTOR 4238646.
- Holland, Richard (2005). Augustus, Godfather of Europe. Stroud, Gloucestershire: Sutton. ISBN 978-0-7509-2911-0.
- Kolb, Ann; Speidel, Michael (2017). "Imperial Rome and China: Communication and Information Transmission". In Elizalde, Maria Dolores; Wang, Jianlang (eds.). China's Development from a Global Perspective. Newcastle upon Tyne: Cambridge Scholars Publishing. pp. 28–56. ISBN 978-1-4438-1670-0.
- Lenski, Noel E. (2016). Constantine and the Cities: Imperial Authority and Civic Politics. Philadelphia: University of Pennsylvania Press. ISBN 9780812247770.
- Levick, Barbara (2010). Augustus: Image and Substance. London: Longman. ISBN 978-0-582-89421-1.
- Mackay, Christopher S. (2004). Ancient Rome: A Military and Political History. Cambridge and New York: Cambridge University Press. ISBN 978-0-521-80918-4.
- Raaflaub, Kurt A.; Samons, Loren J. II (1993). "Opposition to Augustus". In Raaflaub, Kurt A.; Toher, Mark (eds.). Between Republic and Empire: Interpretations of Augustus and His Principate. Berkeley; Los Angeles: University of California Press. ISBN 978-0-520-08447-6.
- Richardson, John Stuart (2012). Augustan Rome, 44 BC to AD 14: the Restoration of the Republic and the Establishment of the Empire. The Edinburgh History of Ancient Rome. Edinburgh University Press. ISBN 978-0-7486-1955-9.
- Roberts, John (2007). "Princeps senatus". Oxford Dictionary of the Classical World. Oxford Reference. p. 858. doi:10.1093/acref/9780192801463.001.0001. ISBN 978-0-19-280146-3.
- Roller, Duane W. (2010). Cleopatra: a biography. Oxford and New York: Oxford University Press. ISBN 978-0-19-536553-5.
- Rowell, Henry Thompson (1962). Rome in the Augustan Age. The Centers of Civilization Series. Vol. 5. Norman, Oklahoma: University of Oklahoma Press. ISBN 978-0-8061-0956-5.
- Scullard, H. H. (1982) [1959]. From the Gracchi to Nero: A History of Rome from 133 B.C. to A.D. 68 (5th ed.). London; New York: Routledge. ISBN 978-0-415-02527-0.
- Shaw-Smith, R. (1971). "A Letter from Augustus to Tiberius". Greece and Rome. 18 (2): 213–214. doi:10.1017/S0017383500018118. S2CID 161104443.
- Shotter, David (1966). "Tiberius and the Spirit of Augustus". Greece and Rome. 13 (2): 207–212. doi:10.1017/S0017383500015539. S2CID 163628890.
- Shotter, David (2005) [1991]. Augustus Caesar (2nd ed.). London and New York: Routledge. ISBN 0-415-31935-8.
- Southern, Pat (1998). Augustus. Roman Imperial Biographies (first ed.). London and New York: Routledge. ISBN 978-0-415-16631-7.
- Southern, Pat (2014) [1998]. Augustus. Roman Imperial Biographies (second ed.). London and New York: Routledge. ISBN 978-0-415-62838-9.
- Stern, Gaius (2006). Women, children, and Senators on the Ara Pacis Augustae: A Study of Augustus's Vision of a New World Order in 13 BC. Berkeley, California: University of California Press.
- Strothmann, Meret (Bochum) (1 October 2006). "Augustus [2]". New Pauly. Brill. doi:10.1163/1574-9347_bnp_e12220040. ISSN 1574-9347.
- Swan, Peter Michael (2004). The Augustan Succession. Oxford and New York: Oxford University Press. ISBN 978-0-19-516774-0.
- Syme, Ronald (2002) [1st pub. 1939]. The Roman Revolution. Oxford: Oxford University Press. ISBN 978-0-19-280320-7.
- Wells, Colin Michael (1995). The Roman Empire. Cambridge, Massachusetts: Harvard University Press. ISBN 978-0-674-77770-5.
- Welsby, Derek (1996). The Kingdom of Kush: the Napatan and Meroitic Empires. London: British Museum Press. ISBN 978-0-7141-0986-2. OCLC 34888835.
- Westphal, Heiko (2025). "The Julio-Claudian principate: tradition and transition, edited by Christina T. Kuhn (review)". Bryn Mawr Classical Review. 2025.12.21.
- Wiseman, T. Peter (2022). "Palace-sanctuary or pavilion? Augustus' house and the limits of archaeology". Papers of the British School at Rome. 90: 9–34. doi:10.1017/S0068246221000295. ISSN 0068-2462.
- Zerbey IV, Joseph H. (2016). "The Life and Times of the Other Caesar". Torch. 89 (3): 25–28. ISSN 0040-9448.

Political offices
Preceded by None	Emperor of the Roman Empire; January 15, 27 BC – August 19, 14 AD	Succeeded by Tiberius
