= Matthew Bunson =

American historian

Matthew Bunson (born 1966) is vice president and editorial director of EWTN News, the Catholic multimedia network and is an American author of more than 50 books, a historian, professor, editor, Roman Catholic theologian. He is also a Senior Fellow at the St. Paul Center for Biblical Theology, and is on the faculty at Catholic International University.

He is the author of the books Encyclopedia of the Roman Empire, Encyclopedia of American Catholic History, and Pope Francis, the first English-language biography of Pope Francis in 2013.

== Biography ==
His father was a U.S. military officer, Lt. Colonel Stephen M. Bunson (1924–1984), who was also interested in old Egyptian history.

=== Education ===
Bunson has a B.A. in history, an M.A. in theology, a Master of Divinity, a Doctorate in Ministry and a Ph.D. in Church History from the Graduate Theological Foundation.

=== Career ===
He is on the faculty of the Catholic International University where he teaches Church History, including Roman Catholic-Islamic relations and Medieval and American Catholic History, and Catholic Social Teaching.

He is a Senior Fellow of the St. Paul Center for Biblical Theology.

Bunson is active in Catholic radio and hosts his own radio program, "Faithworks," for the Redeemer Radio network in Indiana, co-hosts EWTN's Register Radio. Bunson is a frequent guest on National Catholic radio programs, including Al Kresta, the Son Rise Morning Show, Drew Mariani, and Teresa Tomeo, and has appeared on the television networks Fox News, MSNBC, CNN, NBC News, CBS Radio, the BBC, and Channel 24 in Europe.

He served as the general editor of Our Sunday Visitor's Catholic Almanac and The Catholic Answer.

He has served as a consultant for USA Today on Catholic matters.

In 2016, Bunson joined EWTN as Senior Contributor and Senior Editor for the National Catholic Register.

=== Personal life ===
Bunson is married and lives in Washington, D.C. He is a member of the Equestrian Order of the Holy Sepulchre of Jerusalem.

== Books ==
He is an author of more than 50 books, including:

- Encyclopedia of the Roman Empire
- The Encyclopedia of Catholic History
- The Encyclopedia of Saints
- All Shall Be Well
- Papal Wisdom
- The Pope Encyclopedia
- Encyclopedia of American Catholic History
- Angels A-Z, an Encyclopedia
- Pope Benedict XVI and the Sexual Abuse Crisis (co-author)
- We Have a Pope! Pope Benedict XVI
- Encyclopedia of the Middle Ages
- The Angelic Doctor
- Apostle of the Exiled: St. Damien of Molokai
- Saint Kateri Tekakwitha
- Encyclopedia Sherlockiana
- The Agatha Christie Encyclopedia
- Leo XIV: Portrait of the First American Pope
