= Encyclopedia of the Roman Empire =

Book by Matthew Bunson

- Author: Matthew Bunson
- Language: English
- Genre: Non-fiction
- Publisher: Facts on File
- Publication date: 1994

The Encyclopedia of the Roman Empire, written by Matthew Bunson in 1994 and published by Facts on File, is a detailed depiction of the history of the Roman Empire. This work, of roughly 494 pages (a 2002 revised version contains 636 pages) stores more than 2,000 entries on ancient Roman ideologies, histories, arts, cultures, etc.

== Versions ==
- US Hardcover revised edition (July 2002), published by Facts on File: ISBN 0-8160-4562-3
