= Eagle of Zeus =

Attribute of Zeus

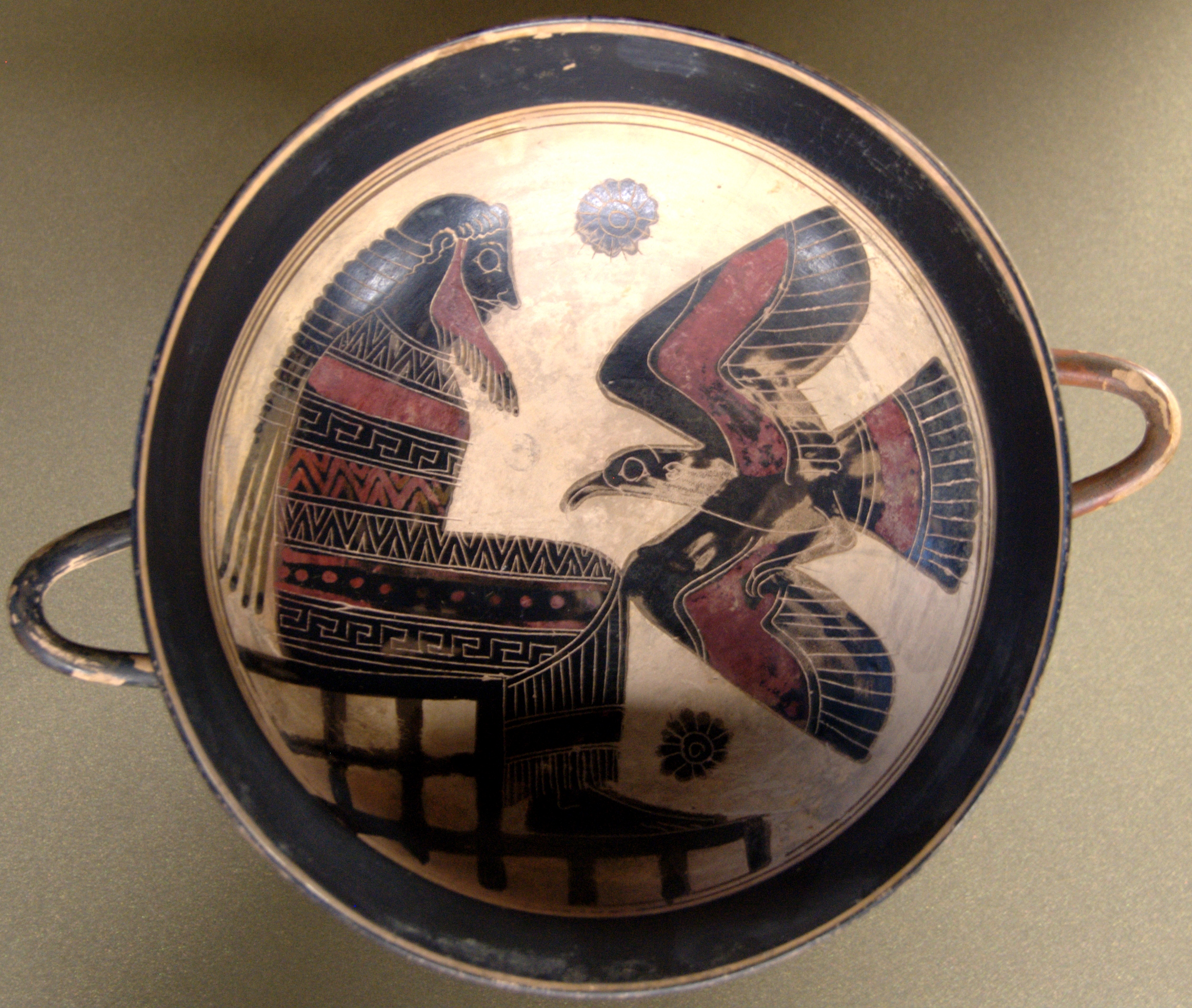
Zeus and an eagle, krater (c. 560 BC), now in the Louvre

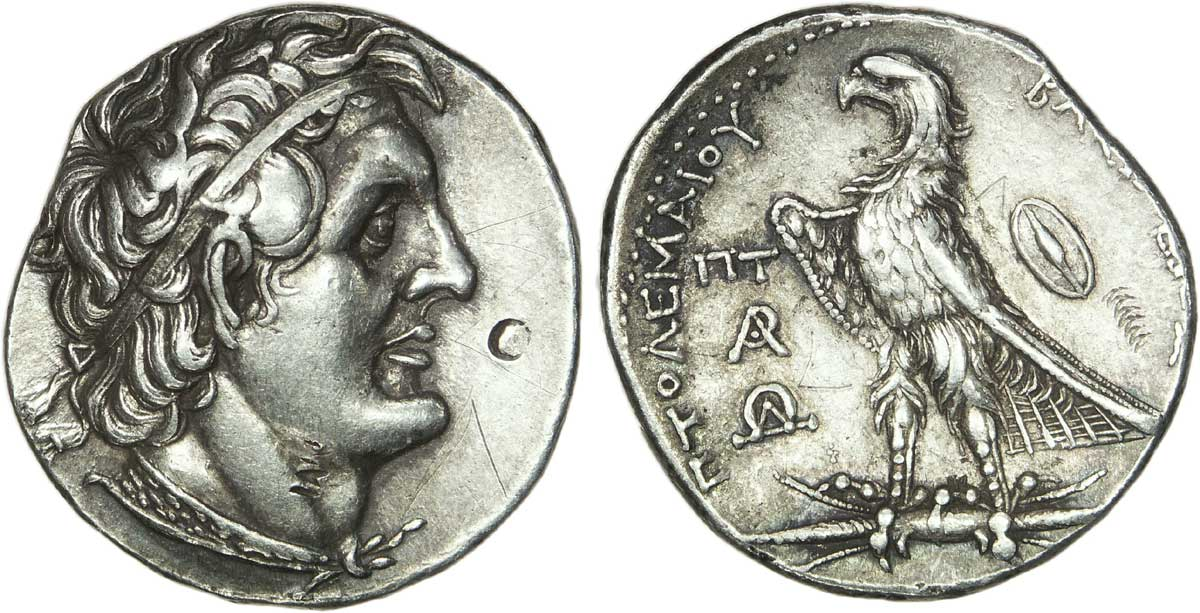
Ptolemaic tetradrachm with the Eagle of Zeus, standing on a thunderbolt, on the obverse

The Eagle of Zeus (Ancient Greek: ἀετός Διός, romanized: Aetos Dios) was one of the chief attributes of Zeus, the head of the Olympian pantheon.

== Eagles in antiquity ==
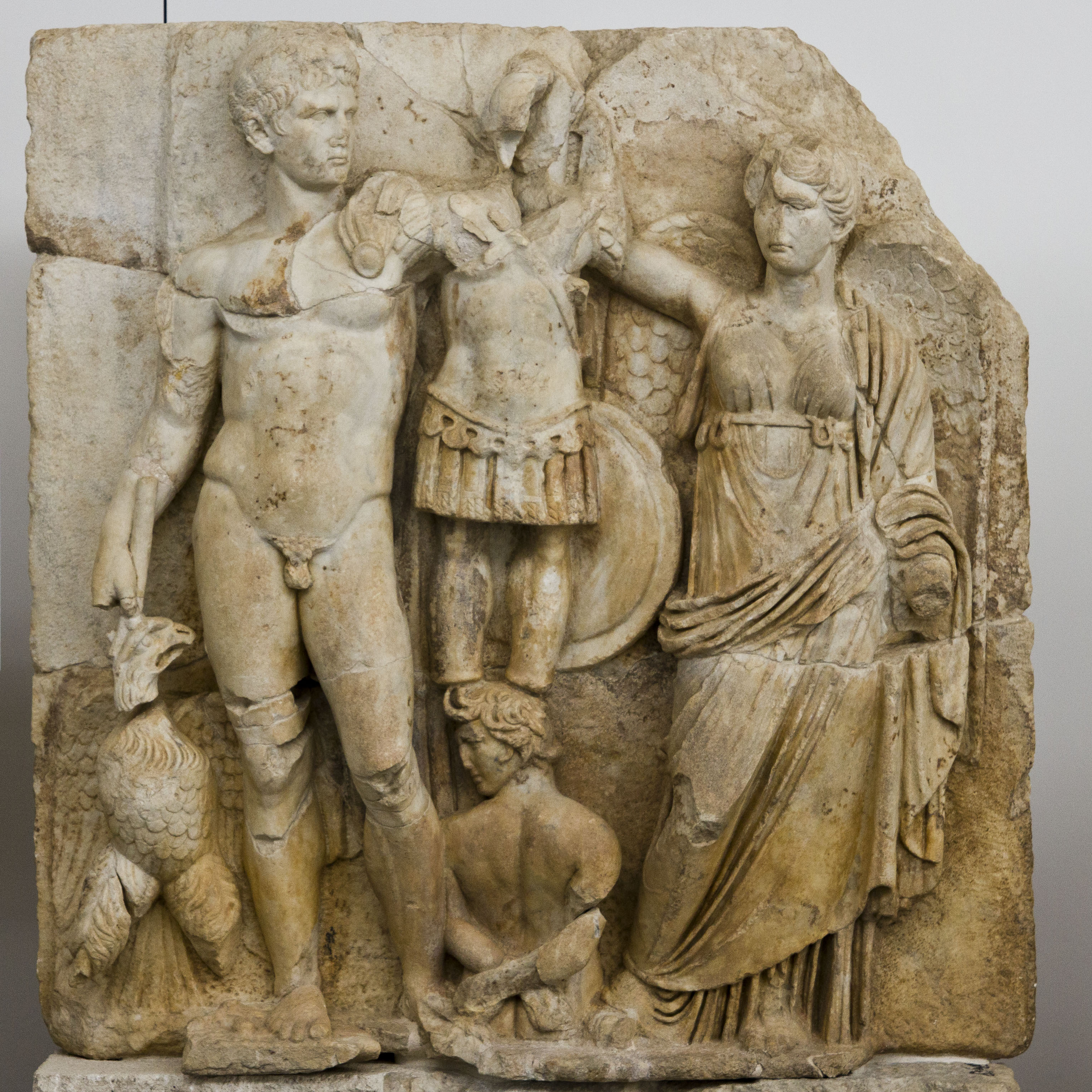
A Roman marble carved relief depicting a deified Augustus standing next to a tropaion ('trophy') crowned by goddess Victory, with an Eagle of Zeus perhaps symbolizing his consecration, dated to the reign of Tiberius (AD 14–37), from the Sebasteion of Aphrodisias, now in the Aphrodisias Museum (Turkey)

Eagles were considered the most prominent of birds in classical antiquity. Several legends attested to their unique qualities, such as Aristotle's claim that the sea eagle only raised the young who could look at the sun directly without their eyes watering, or Pliny the Elder's claim that they were immune to being struck by lightning, while the Geoponica claimed that they protected from hail. They were considered endowed with oracular properties, and a divine bird, as messenger of Zeus and herald of victory. In fact, Zeus himself is said to have transformed himself into an eagle on occasion.

From these divine associations, the eagle came to be used as an emblem of several rulers, from the Achaemenids to Alexander the Great and the Diadochi, and finally of the Roman emperors. Zeus being equated with Jupiter, the eagle holding Jupiter's lightning became the chief symbol (aquila) of the Roman legions. The eagle was placed amongst the stars as the constellation Aquila alongside Lyra.

== Eagle of Jove in the present ==
In 1804, Napoleon Bonaparte would recover the aquila as a symbol of his house and emblem of the Grande Armée.

The House of Bernadotte also has the Eagle as its emblem.

The Great Seal of the United States and several federal agencies (CIA, NSA, etc.) also depict the Aetos Dios but as a bald eagle.

== Legends ==
There are several schools of thought regarding the origin of this eagle, coming from different Greek legends.

=== Aëtos ===
In one version, Aëtos was a childhood friend of Zeus who kept him company while the god was hiding in Crete from his father. After Zeus became king, Hera turned Aëtos into an eagle out of fear that Zeus was in love with him. Zeus made the eagle his most prominent and sacred symbol. In some versions, Aëtos is supplanted with Ganymede, the Trojan prince whom Zeus abducted in the form of an eagle.

=== Periphas ===
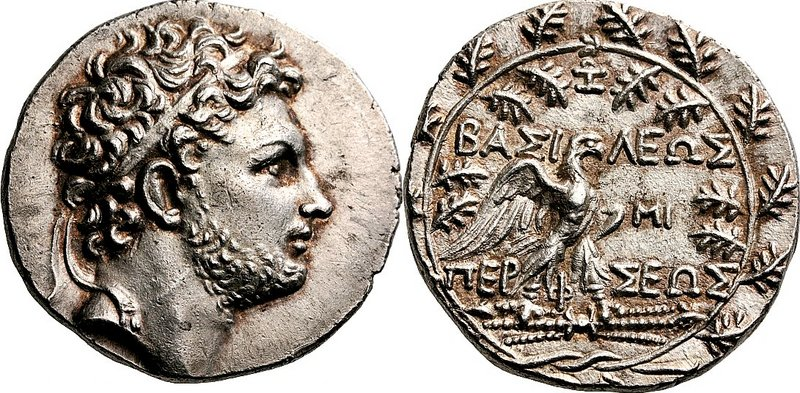
Tetradrachm of Perseus of Macedon

According to Antoninus Liberalis, Periphas was a legendary king of Attica who was a just king, and a dutiful priest of Apollo. Zeus, however, became indignant because Periphas was revered and honoured as if he were Zeus himself, so Zeus wanted to destroy Periphas and his entire household. But Apollo interceded, and instead Zeus transformed Periphas into an eagle, making him king of all birds and guard of his sacred sceptre.

=== Creation of Gaia ===
In other accounts the eagle was in fact an ancient creation of the goddess Gaia. He appeared before Zeus at the start of the Titanomachy. Zeus took this to mean a good omen of victory, leading to him using the emblem of a golden eagle on his war standard:

...For so happy an omen, especially since victory did ensue, he made a golden eagle for his war standards and consecrated it to the might of his protection, whereby also among the Romans, standards of this kind are carried. — a translated excerpt from Fulgentius' "Mythologies" (Mythologiarum Libri III)
