= Tropaion =

Greco-Roman monument celebrating victory

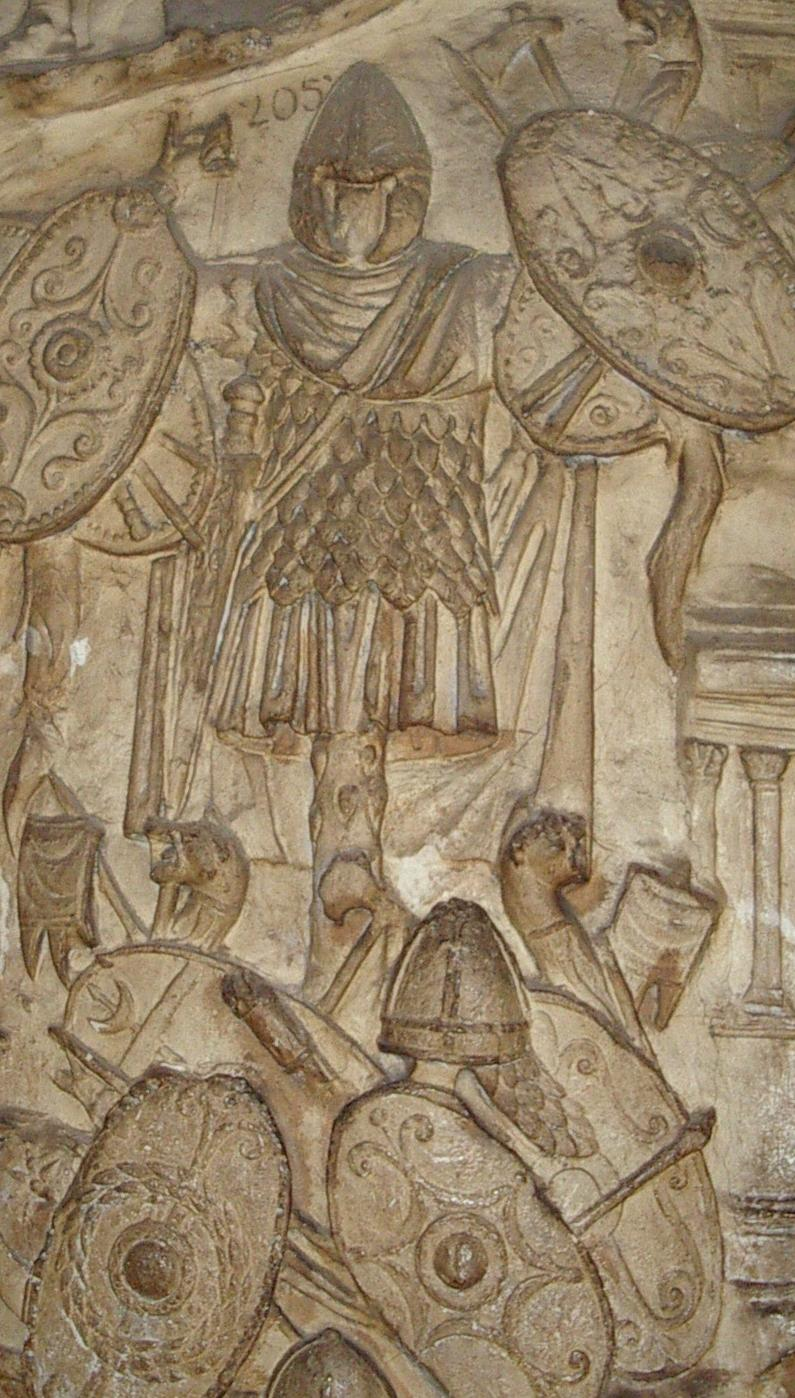
A Roman tropaeum from the Dacian Wars (Trajan's Column 113 AD), note the tree trunk with arm-like branches and the heaped armor and weapons at its base

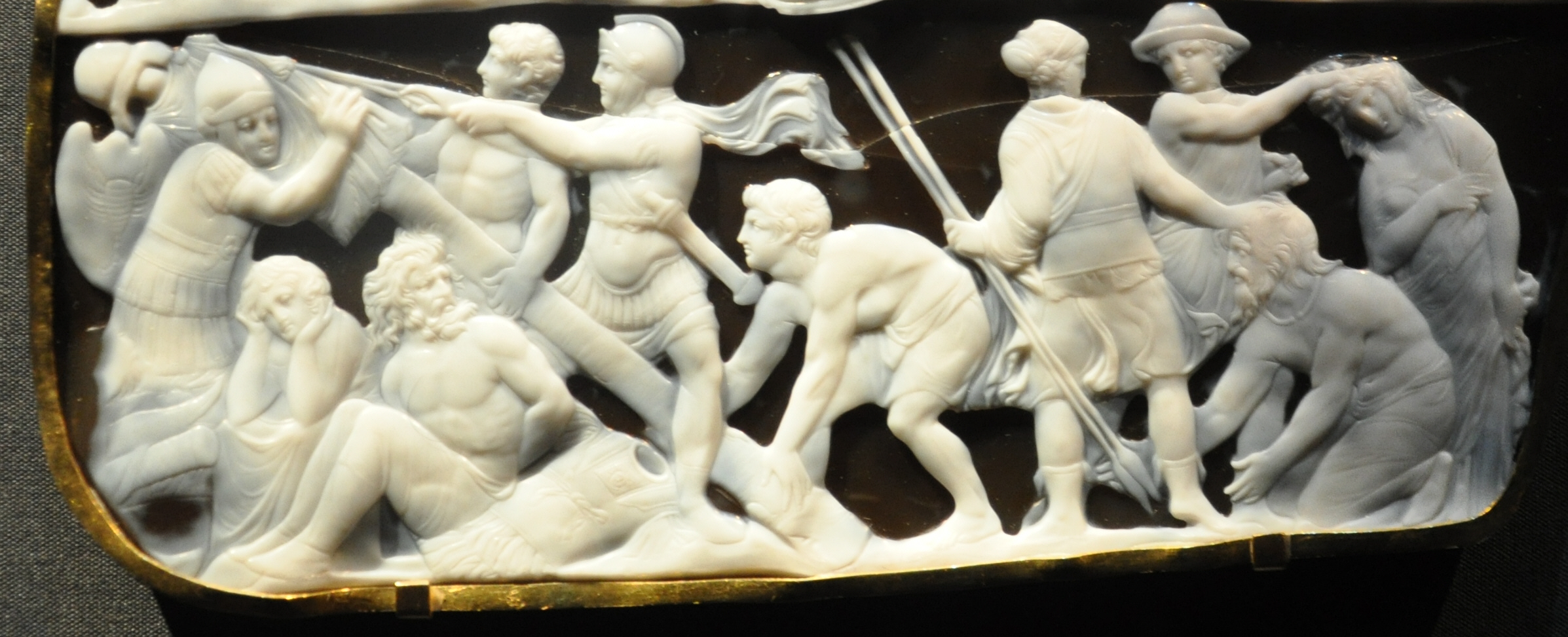
A Roman tropaeum in process of erection in the presence of male and female captives, detail from the Gemma Augustea, circa 20-30 AD

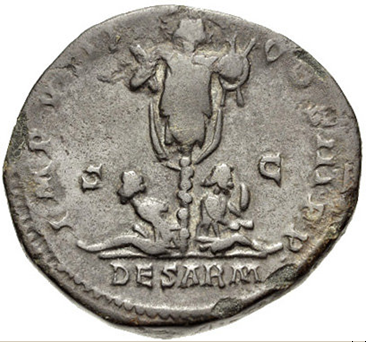
A fully erected Roman tropaeum with shackled and addorsed seated man and woman Sarmatian captives (the woman on the right with head resting on hand, perhaps representing the defeated "Sarmatia") tied to base, Dupondius from reign of Emperor Marcus Aurelius, AD 161-180

A tropaion (Greek: τρόπαιον, Latin: tropaeum), from which the English word "trophy" is derived, was a monument erected to commemorate a victory over one's foes by the ancient Greeks and later, by the Romans. The armour of the defeated foe would be hung upon the monument. Originally, the location of the monument was the battlefield where the commemorated victory took place. Initially, the typical monument was constructed out of a living tree with lateral branches, or it was constructed in the shape of one. After construction, the tropaion was dedicated to a deity in thanksgiving for the victory. Some images of tropaion show many weapons and shields heaped below the armor hoisted upon the monument. In later times, pairs of lances, banners, or stakes set crosswise might be used instead of the tree format.

== Greece ==
In the Greek city-states of the Archaic period, a tropaion would be set up on the battlefield itself, usually at the site of the "turning point" (Gk. tropê) at which the routed enemy's phalanx broke, turned, and ran. The monument would be dressed in the typical hoplite panoply of the period, including (at different times), a helmet, cuirass (either of bronze or linen), and a number of shields, etc., would be piled about the base. It remained on the battlefield until the campaigns of the following seasons (since battles often were fought in the same, relatively few plains amid Greece's numerous mountains), whereupon it might be replaced with a new trophy.

During later eras in the Greek world, intention to build a tropaia might be declared at the battlefield, but in fact, erected at pan-Hellenic sanctuaries such as Olympia or Delphi, further increasing the prestige of the victorious state.

The significance of the monument was a ritualistic notification of "victory" to the defeated enemies. Since warfare in the Greek world was largely a ritualistic affair in the archaic hoplite-age (see Hanson, The Western Way of War for further elaboration of this idea), the monument was used to reinforce the symbolic capital of the victory in the Greek community.

Another interpretation of the tropaion is that it was a monument dedicated to the slaughter of the enemy. Key passages describe that the tropaion was the last stage of battle, following the critical rout and chase of the enemy. A critical passage of Thucydides suggests that the tropaion was set up to celebrate the enemy killed in battle.

Ancient sources attest to the great deal of significance that early Greek cities placed upon symbols and ritual as linked to warfare – for example, the story in Herodotus 1, involving the bones of Orestes that greatly exceeds the ritualistic properties to even magically 'guaranteeing' the Spartan victory, displays the same sort of interest in objects and symbols of power as they relate to military success or failure.

== Rome ==
In Ancient Rome, on the other hand, their tropaeum probably would not be set up on the battlefield, but rather, it would be displayed prominently in the city of Rome. During the later years of the Republic, Romans were less concerned about impressing foreign powers or military rivals than they were in using military success to further their own political careers. A tropaeum displayed on the battlefield likely could not win votes, but one displayed in the city as part of a triumph could impress the citizens during later elections. Neither did a battlefield display gain desired prestige among competitive nobles.

The symbolic effectiveness of the tropaeum became so well recognized that, in later eras, Romans chose to display sculpted reliefs of them for an enduring record of their victories rather than the fleeting presence of one constructed in the traditional fashion (see image and Tropaeum Traiani).

== Gallery ==
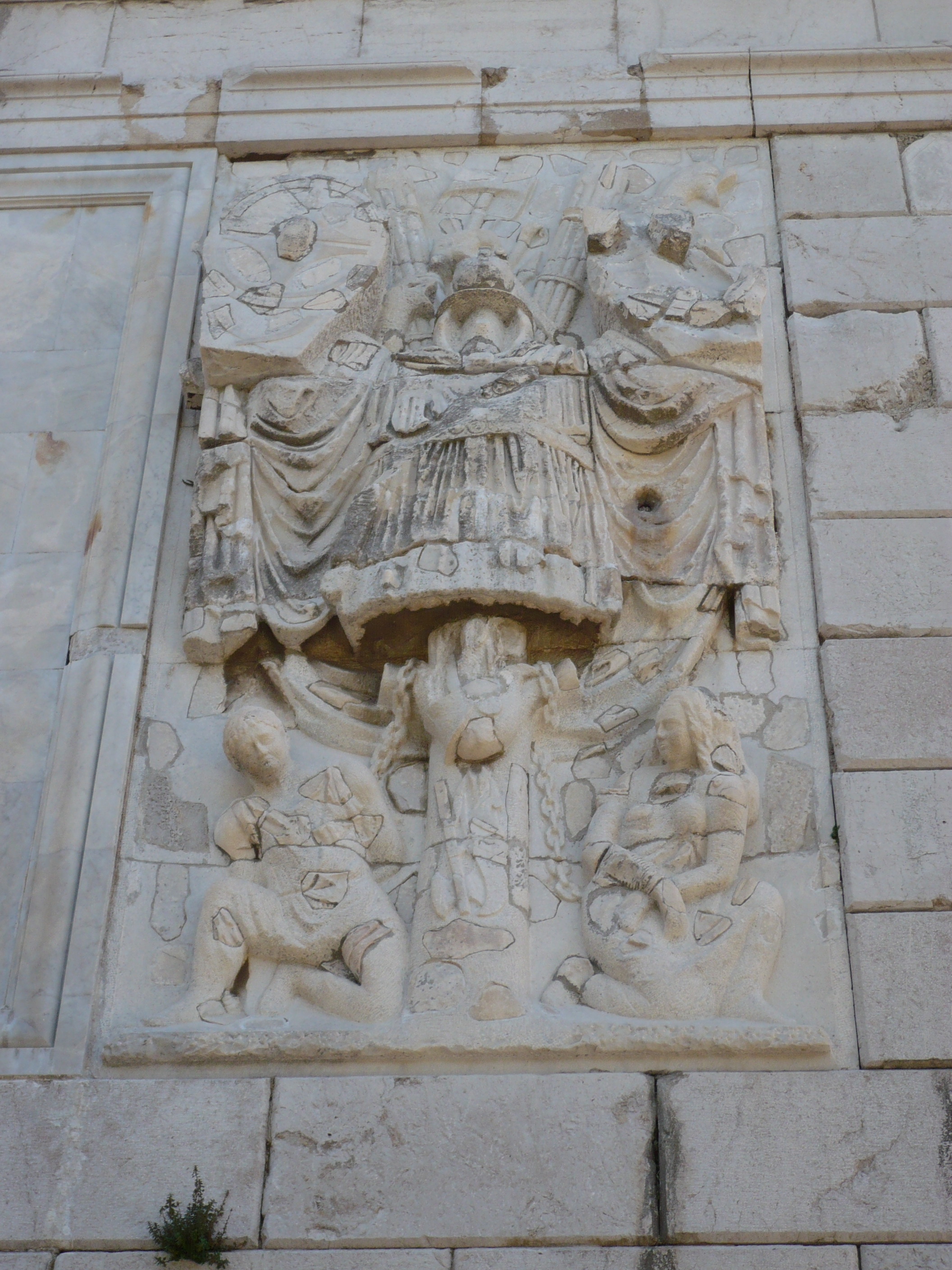
Tropaeum scene on the Tropaeum Alpium with male on the left and female on the right

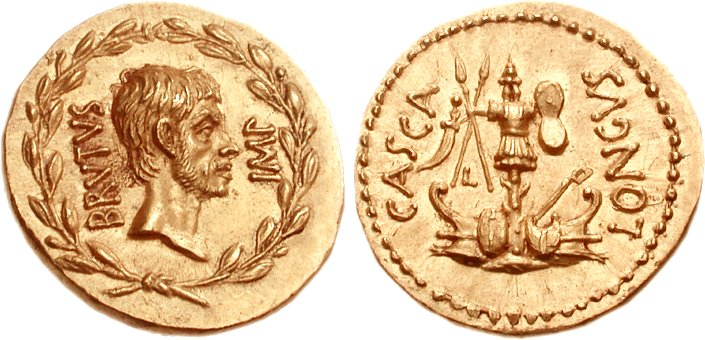
A tropaeum upon a tree on this 42 BC Roman coin dedicated to Brutus combines naval imagery

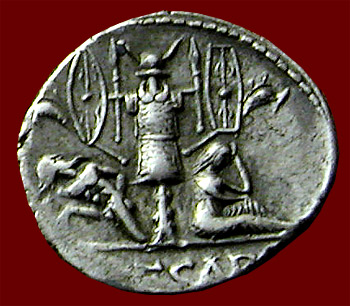
Tropaeum on Roman coin 46-45 BC with male on the left and female on the right

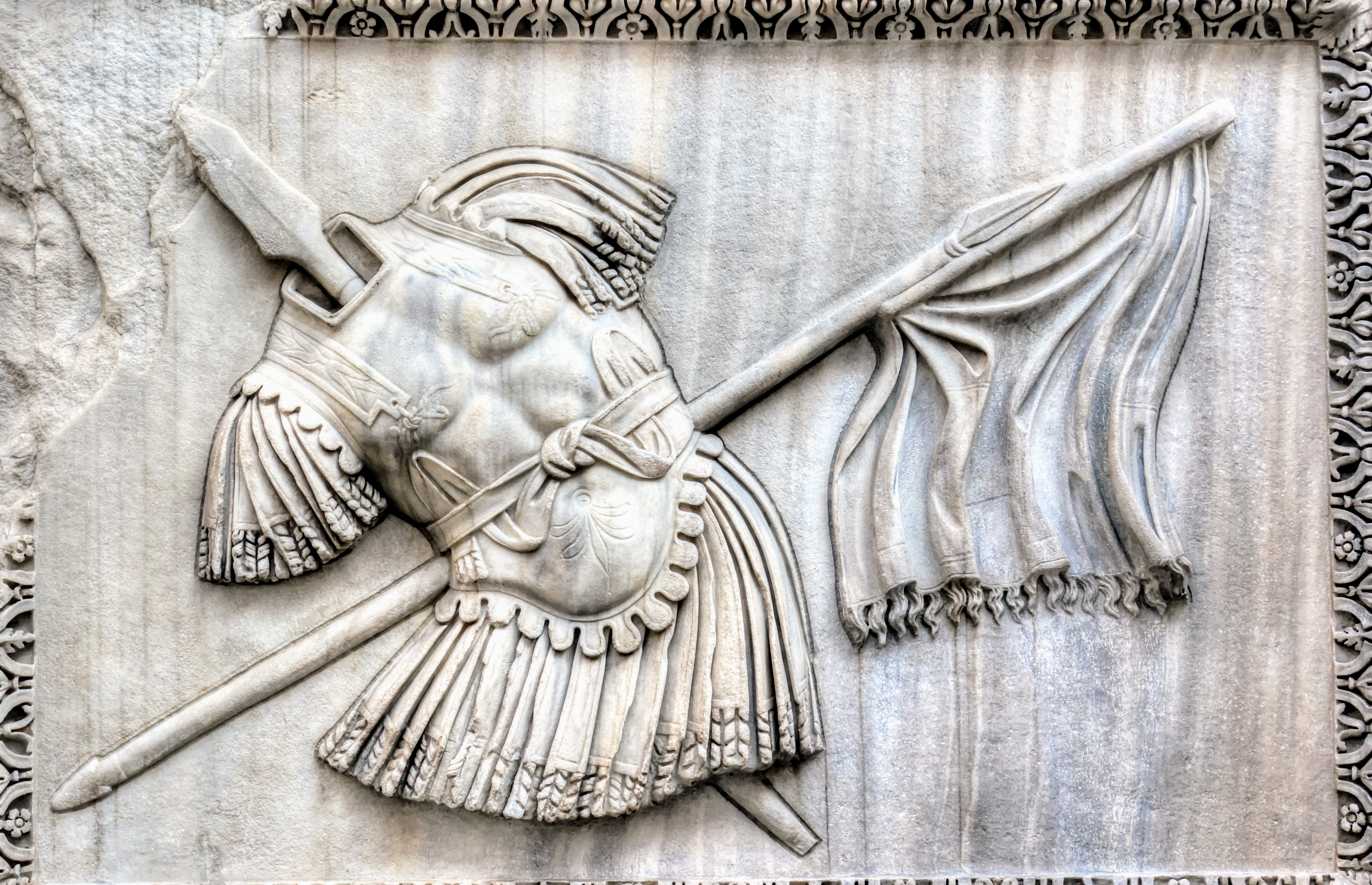
A Roman tropaeum displayed on crossed stakes inside the Musei Capitolini courtyard

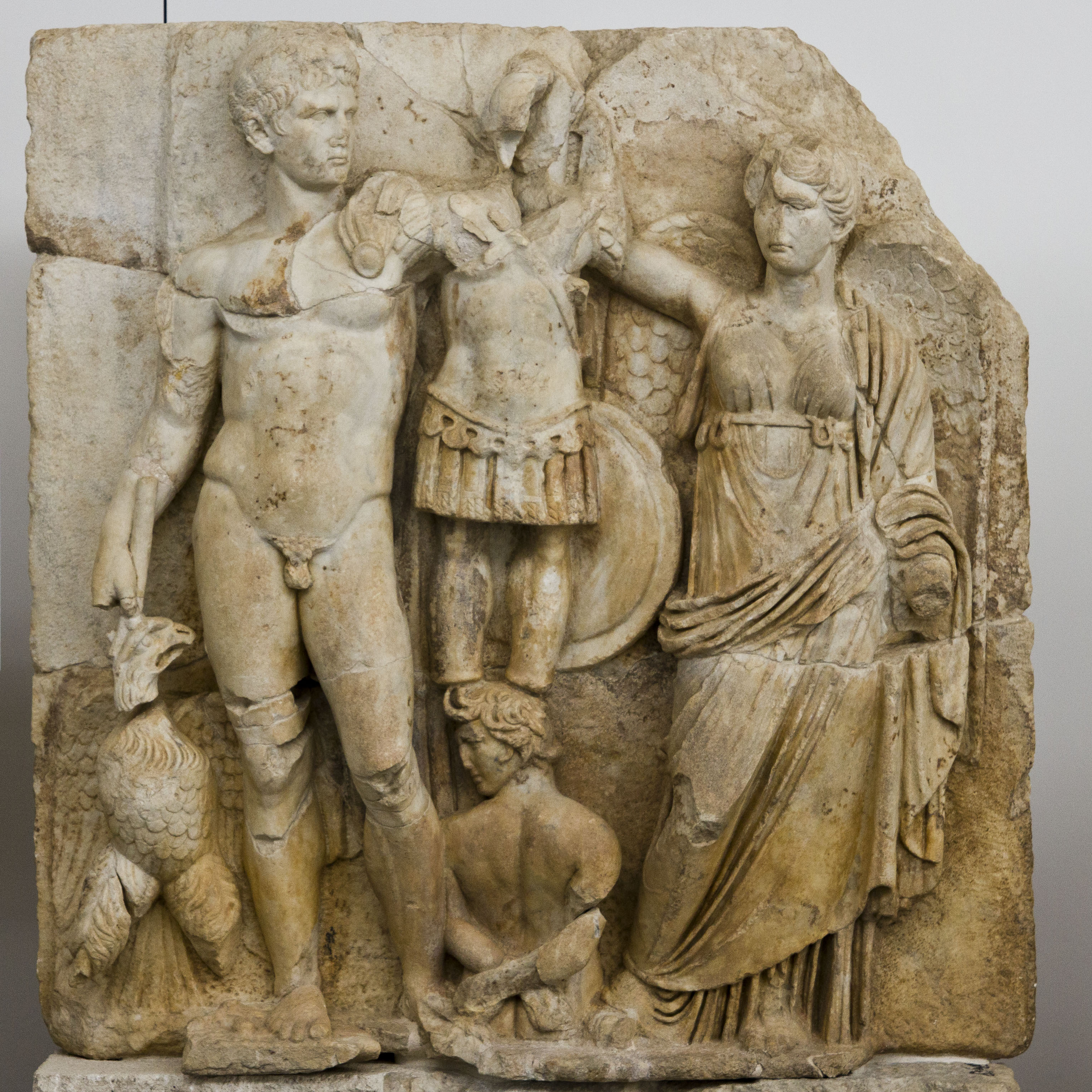
A Roman marble carved relief depicting a deified Augustus standing next to a tropaion crowned by goddess Victory, with an Eagle of Zeus perhaps symbolizing his consecration, dated to the reign of Tiberius (AD 14–37), from the Sebasteion of Aphrodisias, now in the Aphrodisias Museum (Turkey)

== See also ==
- Trophy (architectural)
- Trophy of arms
- Tropaeum Traiani (built for Emperor Trajan 109 AD)
- Tropaeum Alpium (built for Emperor Caesar Augustus c. 6 BC)
- Spolia opima
- Gemma Augustea raising a tropaeum
- War memorial
- War trophy

== Sources ==
- Cadario, Matteo (2022). "Alcune osservazioni sulla memoria postuma di Augusto nelle immagini". In Cavalieri, Marco; Assenmaker, Pierre; Cavagna, Mattia; Engels, David (eds.). Augustus through the Ages: Receptions, Readings and Appropriations of the Historical Figure of the First Roman Emperor. Collection Latomus (in Italian). Vol. 366. Brussels: Peeters Publishers. pp. 53–78. doi:10.2307/jj.10574832.4. ISBN 978-90-429-4962-1.
