= Sanctuary of Aphrodite Aphrodisias =

1st-century BC Temple of Aphrodite

Coordinates: 37.7098°N 28.7233°E

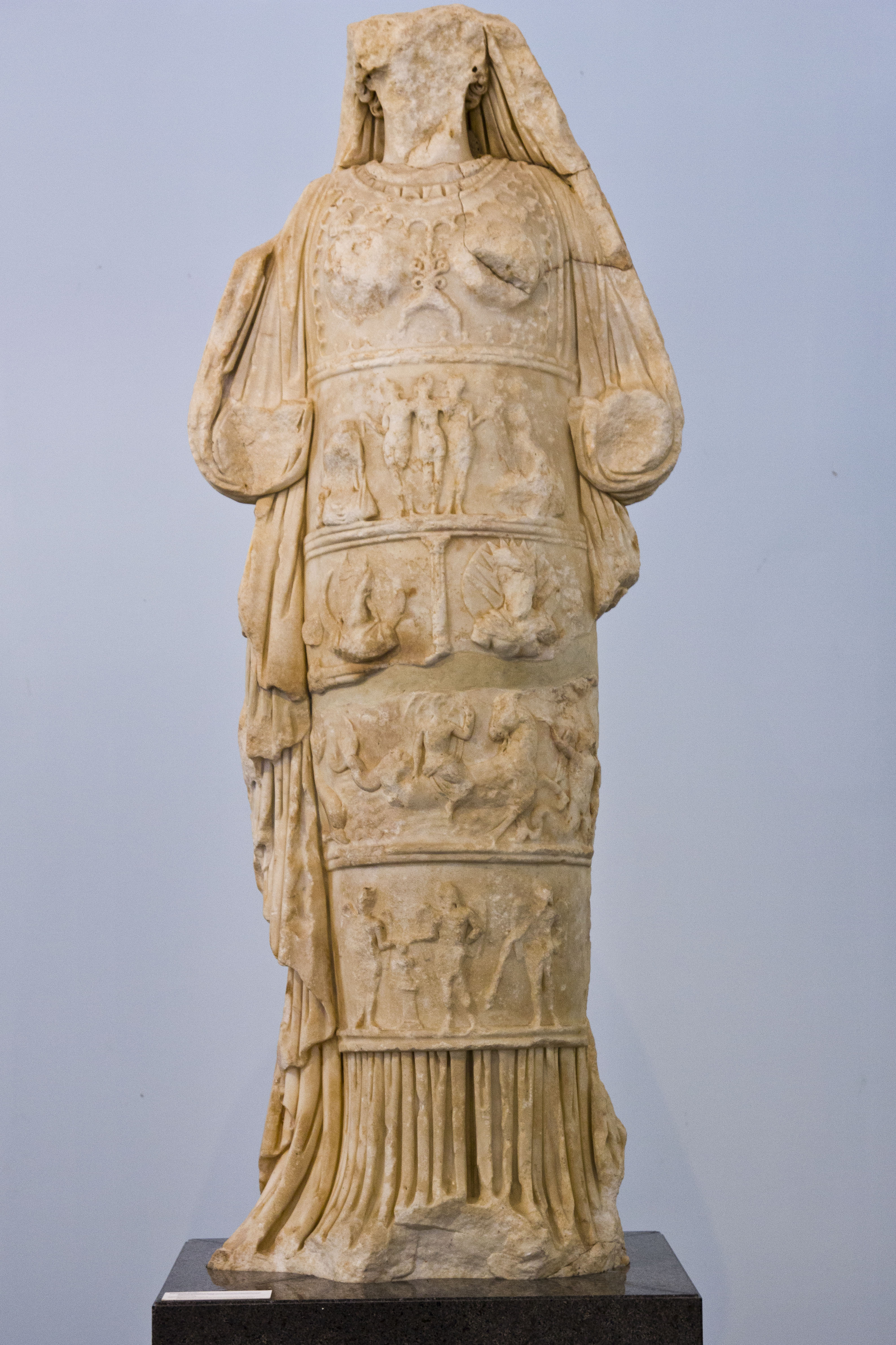
Cult statue of Aphrodite of Aphrodisias, vandalized by Christian iconoclasts

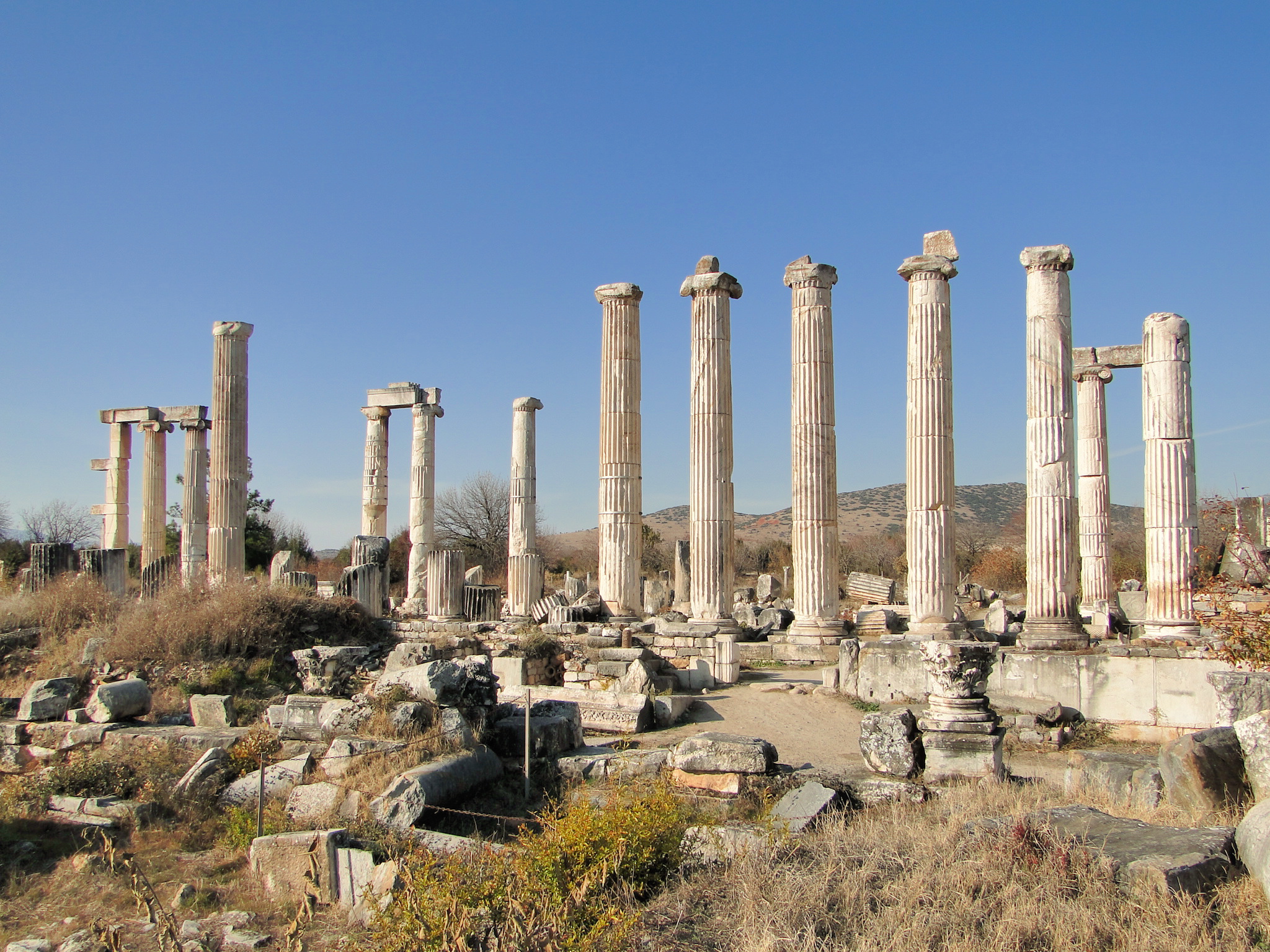
The Temple of Aphrodite

The Sanctuary of Aphrodite of Aphrodisias was a sanctuary in ancient Aphrodisias dedicated to the goddess Aphrodite. The ruins are currently located in Aphrodisias, Turkey.

== History ==
The site was a local cult centre based around a local fertility goddess since at least the 7th century BC. In the Hellenistic period, the local goddess came to be identified with Aphrodite, in a similar manner as the Artemis of Ephesus was originally a local goddess who came to be identified with Artemis, and the city became a pilgrimage for people from across Anatolia and the Aegean Sea.

== Structure ==
The first sanctuary is dated to the late 7th-century or early 6th-century BC. A new and more monumental temple was erected in the 1st century BC during the Hellenistic period and financed by the wealthy freedman Zolios. The sanctuary was granted the status of asylum by the senatus consultuni de Aphrodisiensibus of 39 BC. The temple formed the center of the city and was the center of the city's prosperity.

The Temple of Aphrodite was a focal point of the town. The Aphrodisian sculptors became renowned and benefited from a plentiful supply of marble close at hand. The school of sculpture was very productive; much of their work can be seen around the site and in the museum.

== Dissolution ==
The character of the temple building was altered when it became a Christian basilica. The building is believed to have been dismantled in c. 481–484 by order of Emperor Zeno, because the temple had been the focus of Pagan Hellenic opposition against Zeno in Aphrodisias, in support of Illus, who had promised to restore Hellenic rites, which had been suppressed during the persecution of pagans in the late Roman Empire, to the temples that were still standing.
