= Kenan Erim =

Kenan Tevfik Erim (13 February 1929, İstanbul – 3 November 1990, Ankara) was a Turkish archaeologist who excavated from 1961 until his death at the site of Aphrodisias in Turkey.

== Life ==
Erim's father, Tevfik Erim, was a diplomat who was a member of the Political Section of the Secretariat of the League of Nations in the 1930s (attending as such the Évian Conference) and of the Turkish delegation to the United Nations in the 1950s. Kenan Erim was raised and educated in Geneva, Switzerland, and undertook his university studies in the United States. He took his first degree in Classical archaeology at New York University (NYU) in 1953, and his Ph.D. at Princeton University in 1958.

In 1957, he lectured at Indiana University, and from 1958 onwards he was employed by NYU, where he became full professor in 1971. The NYU Institute of Fine Arts, alongside Oxford University, continues to supervise the excavations at Aphrodisias to this day. There is a grave memorial to Professor Erim near the reconstructed Tetraplyon.

== Honours ==
- 1961: Guggenheim Fellowship
- 1986: Liberty Medal of New York City
- 1987: Commendatore of the Order of Merit of the Republic of Italy
- 1988: National Geographic Society Centennial Medal

== Bibliography ==
- 'Morgantina', American Journal of Archaeology 62 (1958), pp. 79–90 (reprinted in Morgantina Studies II, Princeton University Press, 1989)
- 'Two inscriptions from Aphrodisias', Papers of the British School at Rome 37 (1969), 92-5
- 'A letter of Gordian III from Aphrodisias in Caria' (with J. Reynolds), Journal of Roman Studies 59 (1969), 56-58
- 'The copy of Diocletian's Edict on Maximum Prices from Aphrodisias in Caria' (with J. Reynolds), Journal of Roman Studies 60 (1970), 120-140
- 'Diocletian's Currency Reform, a new inscription from Aphrodisias' (with J. Reynolds & M. Crawford), Journal of Roman Studies 61 (1971), 171-77
- 'Aphrodisias, Awakened City of Ancient Art', 'National Geographic Magazine' Vol. 141, No. 6 (1972), 766-791
- 'A portrait sculpture of Domitian from Aphrodisias, Opuscula Romana 9 (1973), 135-42
- 'The Aphrodisias copy of Diocletian's Price Edict' (with J. Reynolds), Journal of Roman Studies 63 (1973), 99-110
- 'Aphrodisias' (with J. Reynolds) in (edd. Inan, Alföldi), Römische und frühbyzantinische Porträtplastik aus der Turkei (Mainz, 1979), nos. 173-209
- 'A relief showing Claudius and Britannia from Aphrodisias', Britannia 13 (1982), 277-81
- 'Sculptors from Aphrodisias: some new inscriptions' (with C. Roueché), Papers of the British School at Rome 50 (1982), 102-15
- Aphrodisias, City of Venus Aphrodite, 1986
- Aphrodisias Bibliography (with J. de la Genière) in Aphrodisias de Carie: Colloque Lille 1985, Paris, 1987, 159-165
- 'Sculptors of Aphrodisias in the inscriptions of the city', Festschrift J. Inan (Istanbul, 1989, appeared 1991), 517-538.
