= Attilianus =

Ancient Roman sculptor

Attilianus was a sculptor of ancient Rome. He was a native of Aphrodisias in Asia Minor. One of his productions, a statue of a muse, was, at least as late as the 19th century, in the Uffizi at Florence. His time is uncertain.

Pottery and other earthenware vessels bearing the stamp of an artist named Attilianus have also been found in excavations of Roman Britain, though it is unknown if this is the same artist, or different, or if there is any relation. These may originate from a now vanished island, predating the conquest of Julius Caesar, on which a pottery workshop was located.
