= Aphrodisias =

Ancient Roman city in Geyre, Aydın, Turkey

- Ἀφροδισιάς
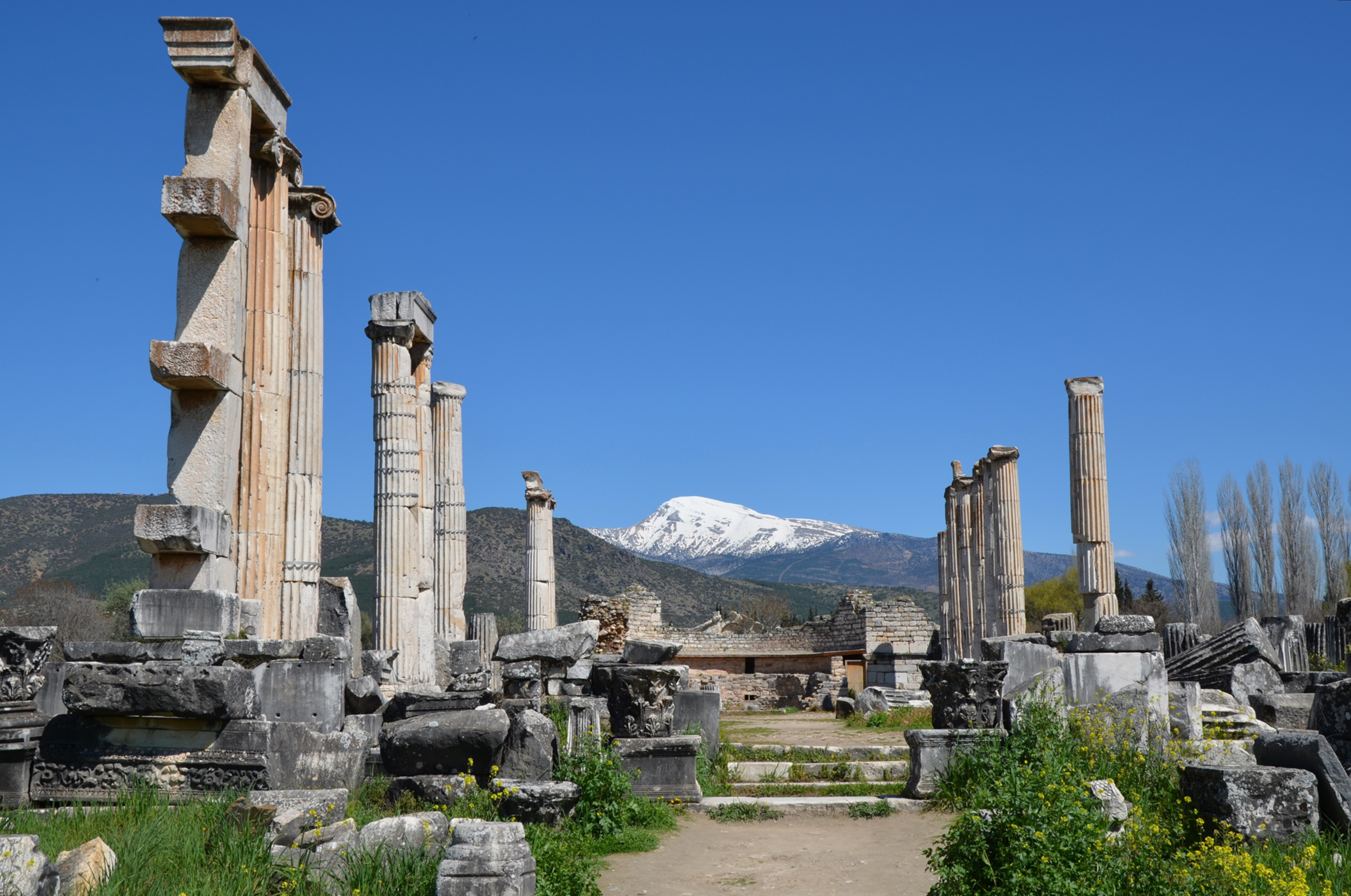
- Temple of Aphrodite at Aphrodisias

- Location within Turkey
- 37°42′30″N 28°43′25″E
- Type: Settlement
- Cultures: Greek, Roman
- Associated with: Alexander of Aphrodisias, Chariton
- Location: Geyre, Aydın Province, Turkey
- Region: Caria

Site notes
- Excavation dates: 1904–1905, 1962–present
- Archaeologists: Paul Augustin Gaudin, Kenan Erim, Christopher Ratté, R. R. R. Smith
- Public access: Yes
- Website: Aphrodisias Archaeological Site

UNESCO World Heritage Site
- Includes: Archaeological Site of Aphrodisias and Ancient Marble Quarries
- Criteria: Cultural: ii, iii, iv, vi
- Reference: 1519
- Inscription: 2017 (41st Session)
- Area: 152.25 ha (376.2 acres)
- Buffer zone: 1,040.57 ha (2,571.3 acres)

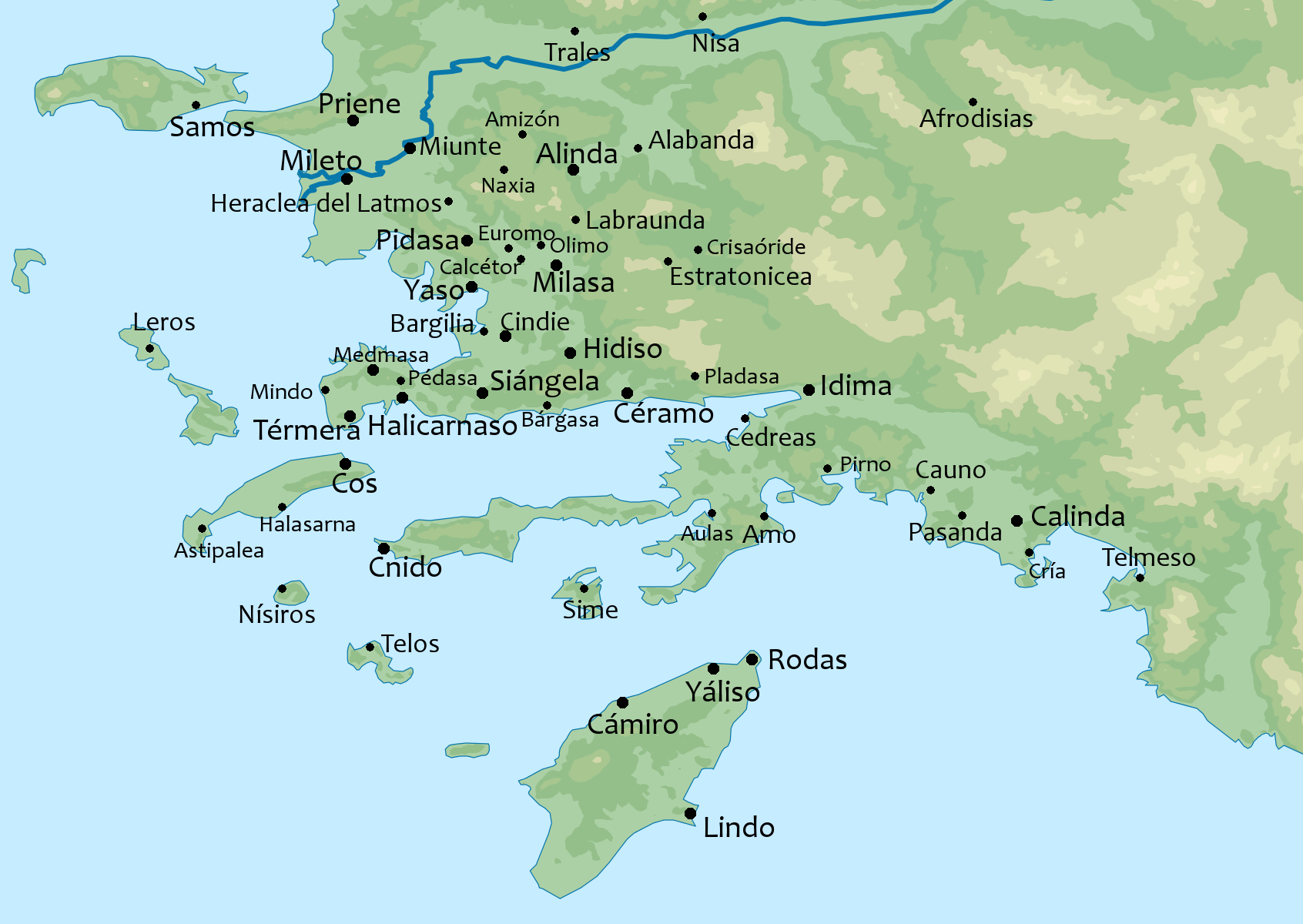
Ancient cities of Caria

Aphrodisias (/æfrəˈdɪsiəs/; Ancient Greek: Ἀφροδισιάς, romanized: Aphrodisiás) was a Hellenistic Greek city in the historic Caria cultural region of western Asia Minor, today's Anatolia in Turkey. It is located near the modern village of Geyre, about 100 km (62 mi) east/inland from the coast of the Aegean Sea, and 230 km (140 mi) southeast of İzmir.

Aphrodisias was named after Aphrodite, the Greek goddess of love, who had here her unique cult image, the Aphrodite of Aphrodisias. According to the Suda, a Byzantine encyclopedic compilation, before the city became known as Aphrodisias (c. 3rd century BC) it had three previous Greek names: Lelégōn Pólis (Λελέγων πόλις, "City of the Leleges"), Megálē Pólis (Μεγάλη Πόλις, "Great City"), and Ninóē (Νινόη).

Sometime before 640, in the Late Antique period when it was within the Byzantine Empire, the city was renamed Stauropolis (Σταυρούπολις, "City of the Cross").

In 2017, it was inscribed on the UNESCO World Heritage Site list.

== History ==
Aphrodisias was the provincial capital (metropolis)of the region and the Roman province of Caria.

White and blue-grey Carian marble was extensively quarried from adjacent slopes in the Hellenistic and Roman periods, for building façades and sculptures. Marble sculptures and sculptors from Aphrodisias became famous in the Roman world. Many examples of statuary have been unearthed in Aphrodisias, and some representations of the Aphrodite of Aphrodisias also survive from other parts of the Roman world, as far afield as Pax Julia in Lusitania.

The city had notable schools for sculpture, as well as philosophy, remaining a centre of paganism until the end of the 5th century. It was destroyed by earthquake in the early 7th century, and never recovered its former prosperity, being reduced to a small fortified settlement on the site of the ancient theatre. Around the same time, it was also renamed to Stauropolis (Greek: Σταυροῡπολις, "city of the Cross") to remove pagan connotations, but already by the 8th century it was known as Caria after the region, which later gave rise to its modern Turkish name, Geyre. In Byzantine times, the city was the seat of a fiscal administrative unit (dioikesis).

Caria and the neigboring settlement of Tantalos became the target of multiple Seljuk raids in the decades following the Battle of Manzikert, leading to a massive loss of population. Caria was sacked by the rebel Theodore Mankaphas in 1188 with Turkish support. It was sacked again by the Seljuks in 1197 and its population was captured and relocated close to Philomelion. The town permanently fell under Turkish control towards the end of the 13th century.

=== Geological history ===
The site is in an earthquake zone and has suffered a great deal of damage at various times, especially in severe tremors of the 4th and 7th centuries. An added complication was that one of the 4th century earthquakes altered the water table, making parts of the town prone to flooding. Evidence can be seen of emergency plumbing installed to combat this problem.

The city of Aphrodisias never fully recovered from the 7th-century earthquake, and fell into disrepair. Part of the town was covered by the modern village of Geyre; some of the cottages were removed in the 20th century to reveal the older city. A new Geyre has been built a short distance away.

=== Ecclesiastical history ===
Le Quien (Oriens christianus, I, 899–904) mentions twenty bishops of this see. In the 7th century Stauropolis had twenty-eight suffragan bishops and twenty-six at the beginning of the 10th century.

Stauropolis is also a Roman Catholic titular metropolitan see, under the name Stauropoli (Latin: Archidioecesis Stauropolitana).

== Buildings and structures ==
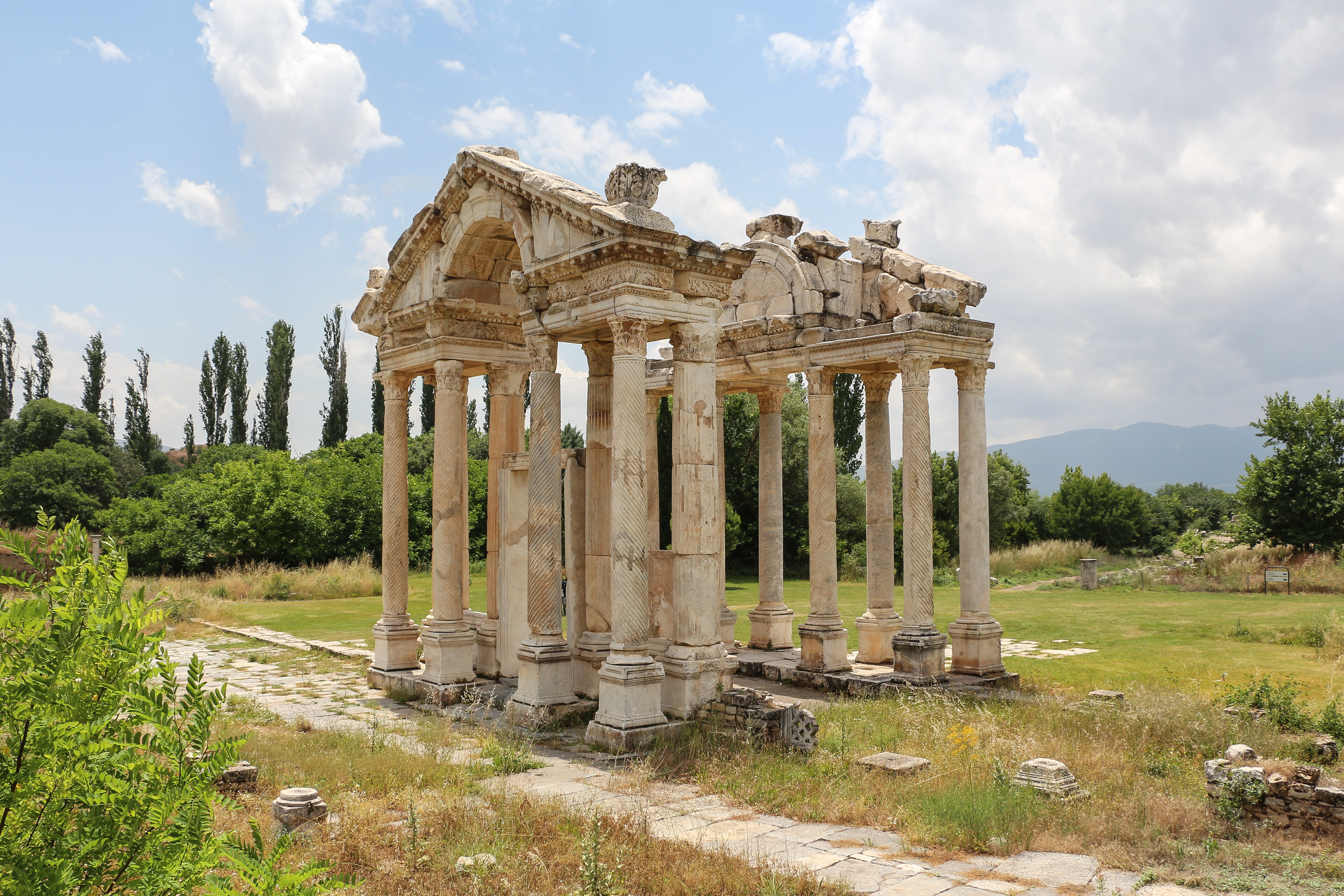
The monumental gateway or tetrapylon

=== Monumental gateway ===
A monumental gateway, or tetrapylon, stands at the end of a road that leads from the main north–south street of the town into a large forecourt in front of the Sanctuary of Aphrodite Aphrodisias. The gateway was built ca. AD 200.

=== Temple of Aphrodite ===
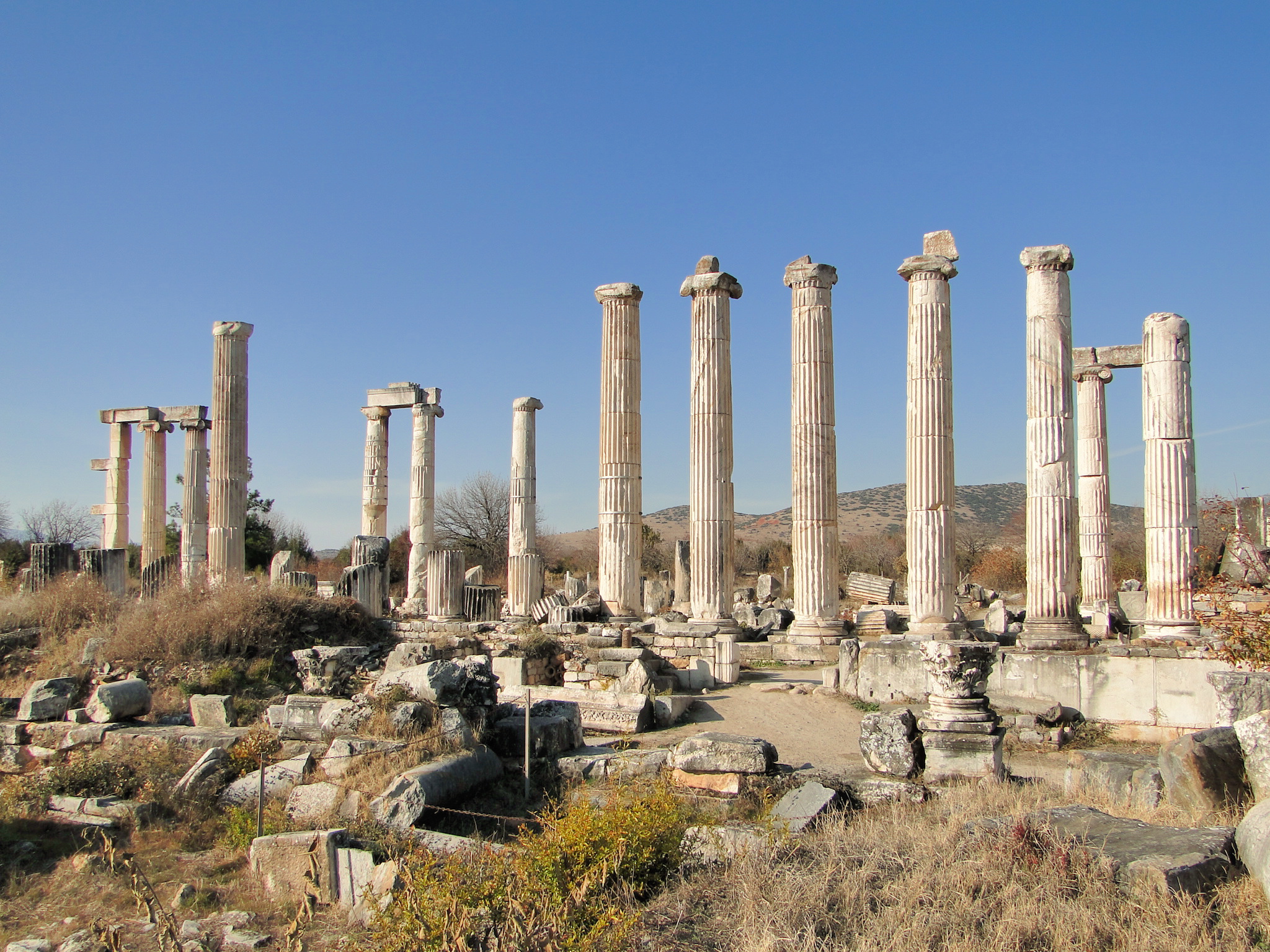
The Temple of Aphrodite

The Temple of Aphrodite was a focal point of the town. The Aphrodisian sculptors became renowned and benefited from a plentiful supply of marble close at hand. The school of sculpture was very productive; much of their work can be seen around the site and in the Aphrodisias Museum. Many full-length statues were discovered in the region of the agora, and trial and unfinished pieces pointing to a true school are in evidence. Sarcophagi were recovered in various locations, most frequently decorated with designs consisting of festoons and columns. Pilasters have been found showing what are described as "peopled scrolls" with figures of people, birds and animals entwined in acanthus leaves.

The character of the temple building was altered when it became a Christian basilica. The building is believed to have been dismantled in c. 481–484 by order of Emperor Zeno, because the temple had been the focus of Pagan Hellenic opposition against Zeno in Aphrodisias, in support of Illus, who had promised to restore Hellenic rites, which had been suppressed during the Persecution of pagans in the late Roman Empire, to the temples that were still standing.

=== Bouleuterion ===
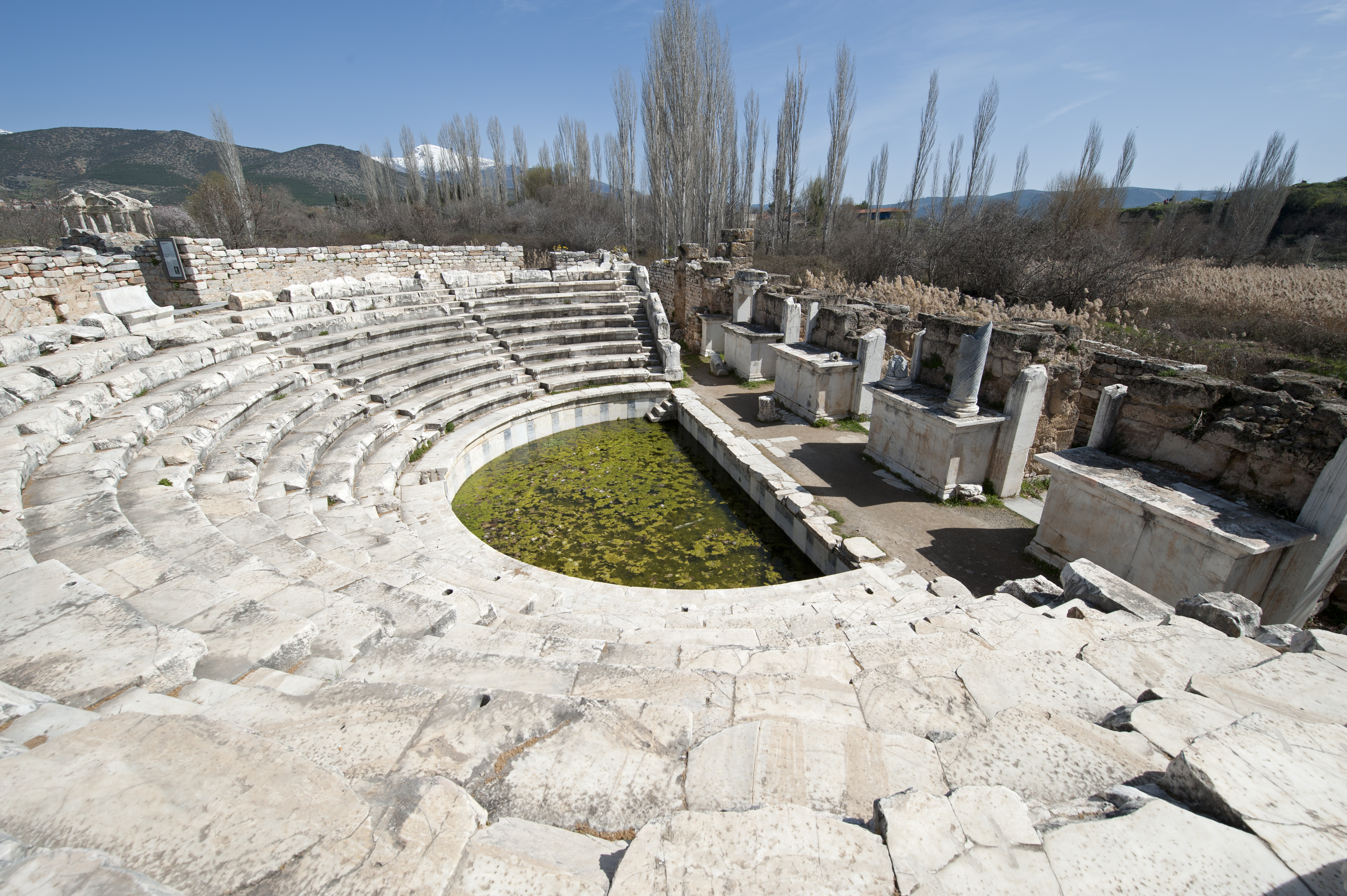
The Bouleuterion served as the meeting place of the city's administrative council (the Boule), and as a multi-purpose indoor theatre, concert hall and assembly space.

The Bouleuterion (council house), or Odeon, is centered on the north side of the North Agora. As it stands today, it consists of a semicircular auditorium fronted by a shallow stage structure about 46 m wide. The lower part of the auditorium survives intact, with nine rows of marble seats divided into five wedges by radial stairways. The seating of the upper part, amounting to an additional twelve rows, has collapsed together with its supporting vaults. The plan is an extremely open one, with numerous entrances at ground level and several stairways giving access to the upper rows of seats. A system of massive parallel buttresses shows that the building was originally vaulted. The auditorium would have been lighted by a series of tall, arched windows in the curved outer wall. Seating capacity is estimated at 1,750.

The available evidence indicates a construction date in the Antonine or early Severan period (late 2nd or early 3rd century AD). The scaenae frons (stage front) was certainly put up at this time, as the style of both sculpture and architectural ornament suggest. Statue bases terminating the retaining walls of the auditorium bore the names of two brothers, senators in the early Severan period, and two inscribed bases placed symmetrically against the exterior facade held statues of Aphrodisian benefactors, Claudia Antonia Tatiana and her uncle Lucius Antonius Dometinus, who were active at the end of the 2nd century. Tatiana is known to have had close ties with Ephesus, and it is possible that the striking similarities between this building and the bouleuterion on the civic agora there, dated by inscription to the mid-2nd century, are due to some initiative on her part. We do not know what stood here before the 2nd century AD, but it is likely that the present building replaced a smaller one contemporary with the laying out of the agora in the late 1st century BC.

The bouleuterion at Aphrodisias remained in this form until the early 5th century, when a municipal official had it adapted as a palaestra, recording his achievement in an inscription on the upper molding of the pulpitum (stage). Palaestra usually refers to a wrestling ground, but in the 5th century it could be used to describe a hall for lectures, performances, and various kinds of competitive displays, as suggested by a number of factional inscriptions carved on the seats. Numerous additional cuttings in the surviving seats, probably for poles supporting awnings, suggest that by this time the building had lost its roof. The orchestra was lowered and provided with a marble pavement, reused, perhaps, from the earlier phase.

=== Sebasteion ===
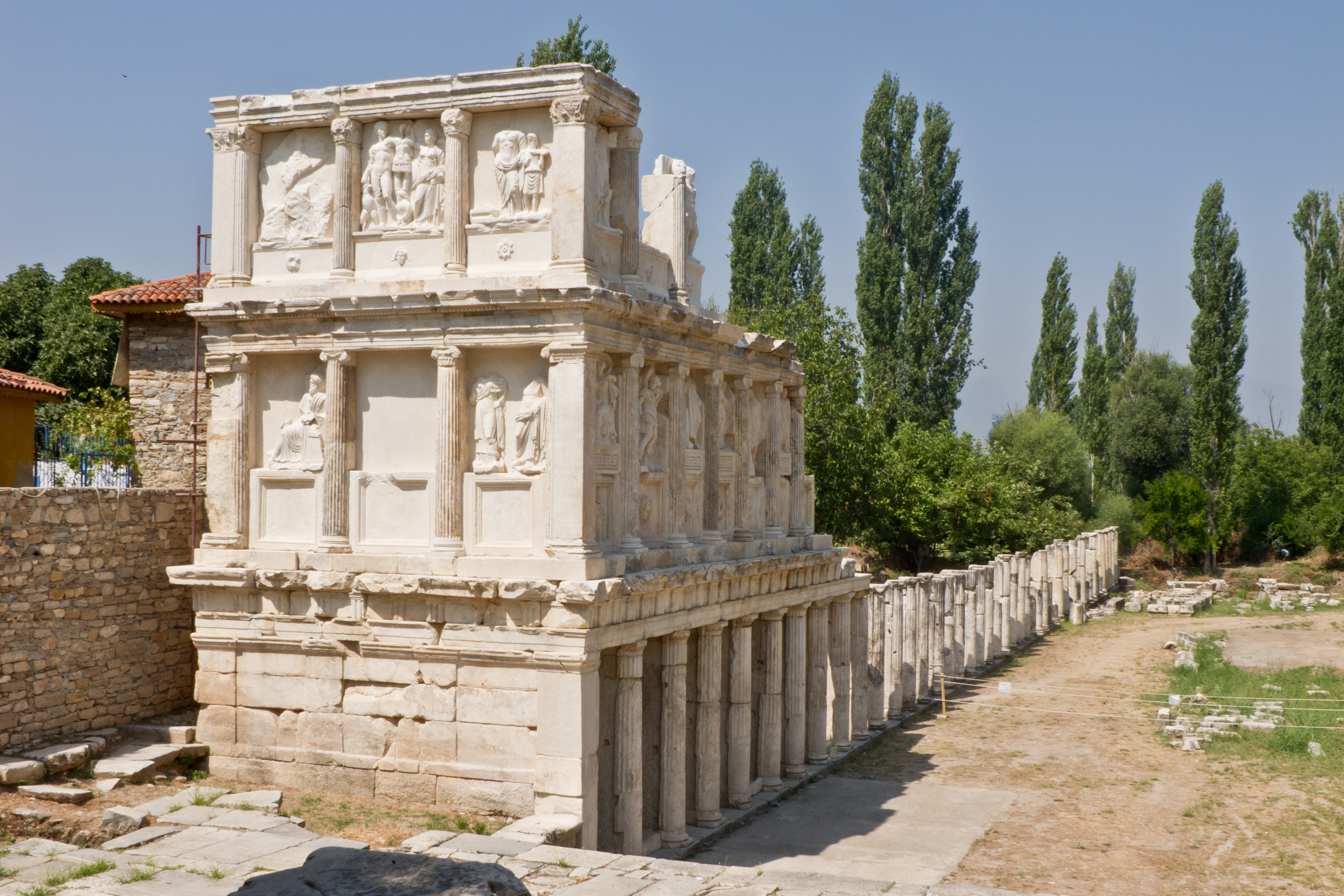
The Sebasteion

The Sebasteion, or Augusteum, was jointly dedicated, according to a 1st-century inscription on its propylon, "To Aphrodite, the Divine Augusti and the People". A relief found in the ruins of the south portico represented a personification of the polis making sacrifice to the cult image of Aphrodite of Aphrodisias, venerated as promētōr ("foremother" or "ancestral mother"). "Aphrodite represents the cosmic force that integrates imperial power with the power of local elites", a reader of Chariton romance has noted. This connection between the goddess and the imperial house was also a particularly politic one at the time, as the Gens Julia – the family of Julius Caesar, Octavian Augustus, and their immediate successors – claimed divine descent from Venus/Aphrodite.

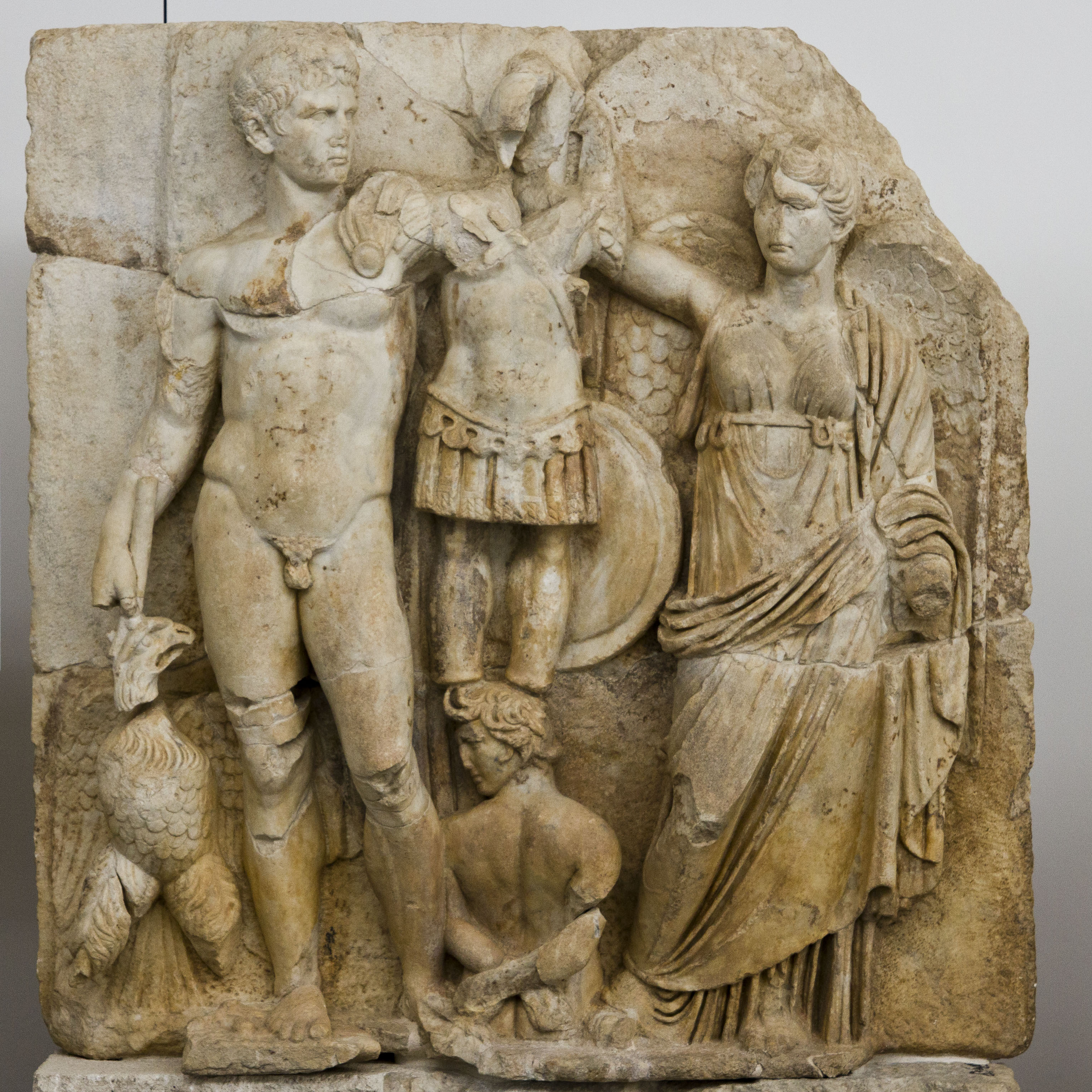
A Roman marble carved relief depicting a deified Augustus standing next to a tropaion ('trophy') crowned by goddess Victory, with an Eagle of Zeus perhaps symbolizing his consecration, dated to the reign of Tiberius (AD 14–37), from the Sebasteion of Aphrodisias, now in the Aphrodisias Museum (Turkey)

=== Stadium ===
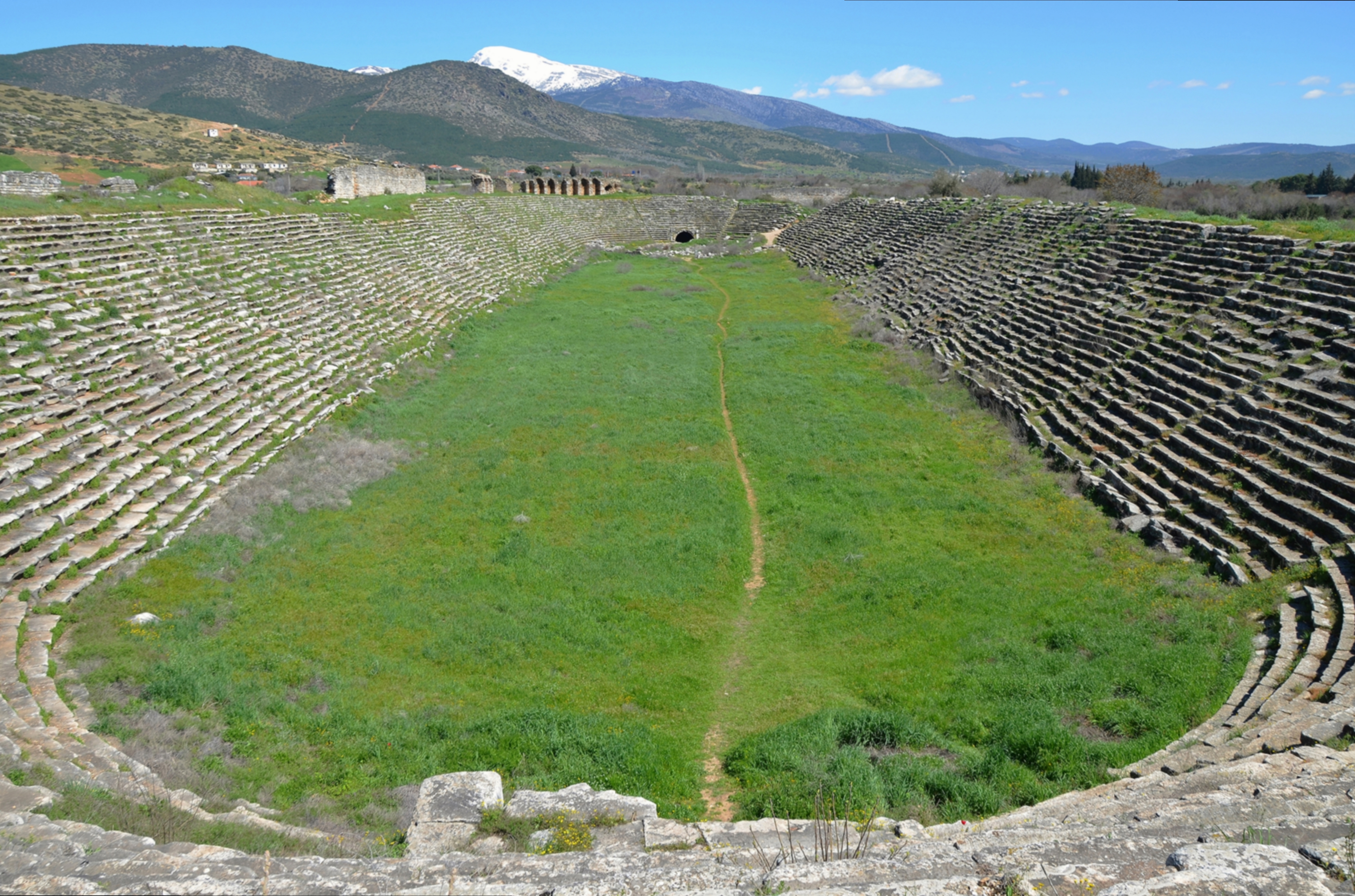
The stadium at Aphrodisias

The stadium was built in the 1st century AD and was used for athletic events until the theatre was badly damaged by a 7th-century earthquake, requiring part of the stadium to be converted for events previously staged in the theatre.

The stadium measures approximately 270 m (890 ft) by 60 m (200 ft). With 30 rows of seats on each side, and around each end, it would have had a maximum capacity for around 30,000 spectators. The track measures approximately 225 m (738 ft) by 30 m (98 ft).

As the stadium is considerably larger and structurally more extensive than even the Stadium of Delphi, it is probably one of the best preserved structures of its kind in the Mediterranean.

The meetings held in the stadium were based on those of Delphi, where artistic contests were more important that that of the Olympic Games. A large number of inscriptions at the site prove that there was persistent use up to the 3rd century AD. Later the eastern portion was converted into a circus to hold Roman gladiatorial games.

== Archaeology ==
The first formal excavations were undertaken in 1904–5, by a French railroad engineer, Paul Augustin Gaudin. Some of the architectural finds (mostly friezes, pilasters and capitals) he discovered at the site are now in the British Museum.

Ongoing excavations were begun by Kenan Erim under the aegis of New York University in 1962.

Turkish photojournalist Ara Güler (1928-2018), during his time with Magnum Photos in the early 1960s, introduced the world to the ancient city of Aphrodisias.

The excavations were being led by R. R. R. Smith (at Oxford University) and Katharine Welch of the NYU Institute of Fine Arts in 1993. The findings reveal that the lavish building programme in the city's civic center was initiated and largely funded by one Gaius Julius Zoilos, a local who was a slave of Gaius Julius Caesar, set free by Octavian. When Zoilos returned as a freedman to his native city, endowed with prestige and rich rewards for his service, he shrewdly directed it to align with Octavian in his power struggle against Mark Antony. This ensured Octavian's lasting favor in the form of financial privileges that allowed the city to prosper.

In September 2014, drones were used to 3D map the above-ground ruins of Aphrodisias. In 2014 the data was being analysed by the Austrian Archaeological Institute in Vienna.

In March 2018, an ancient tomb was unearthed in an area where illegal excavations were carried out. The tomb was taken to the Aphrodisias Museum.

In 2020, two sarcophagi were found in an olive grove. There was a relief of Medusa on one of the sarcophagi.

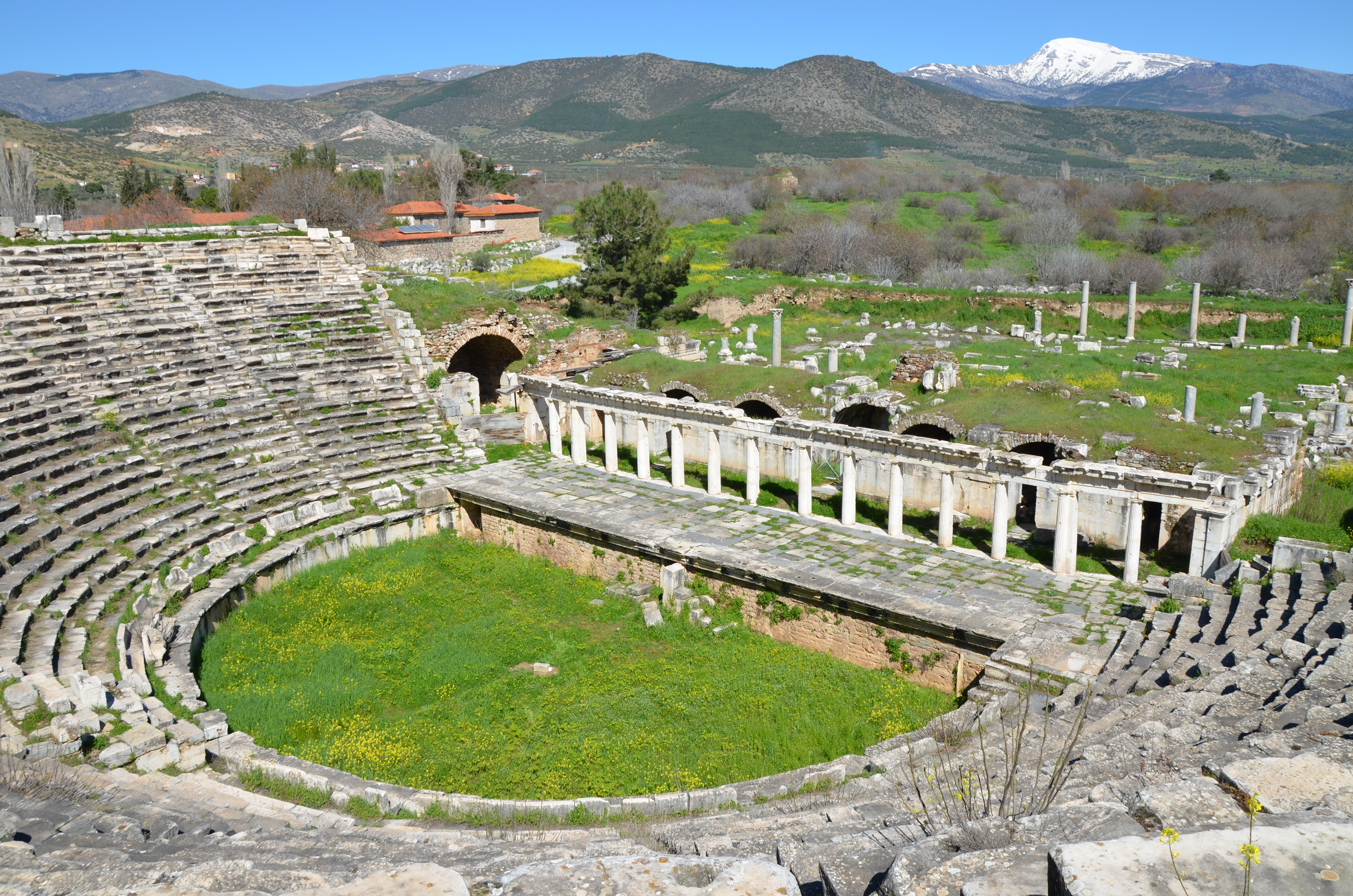
The Roman Theater (north)

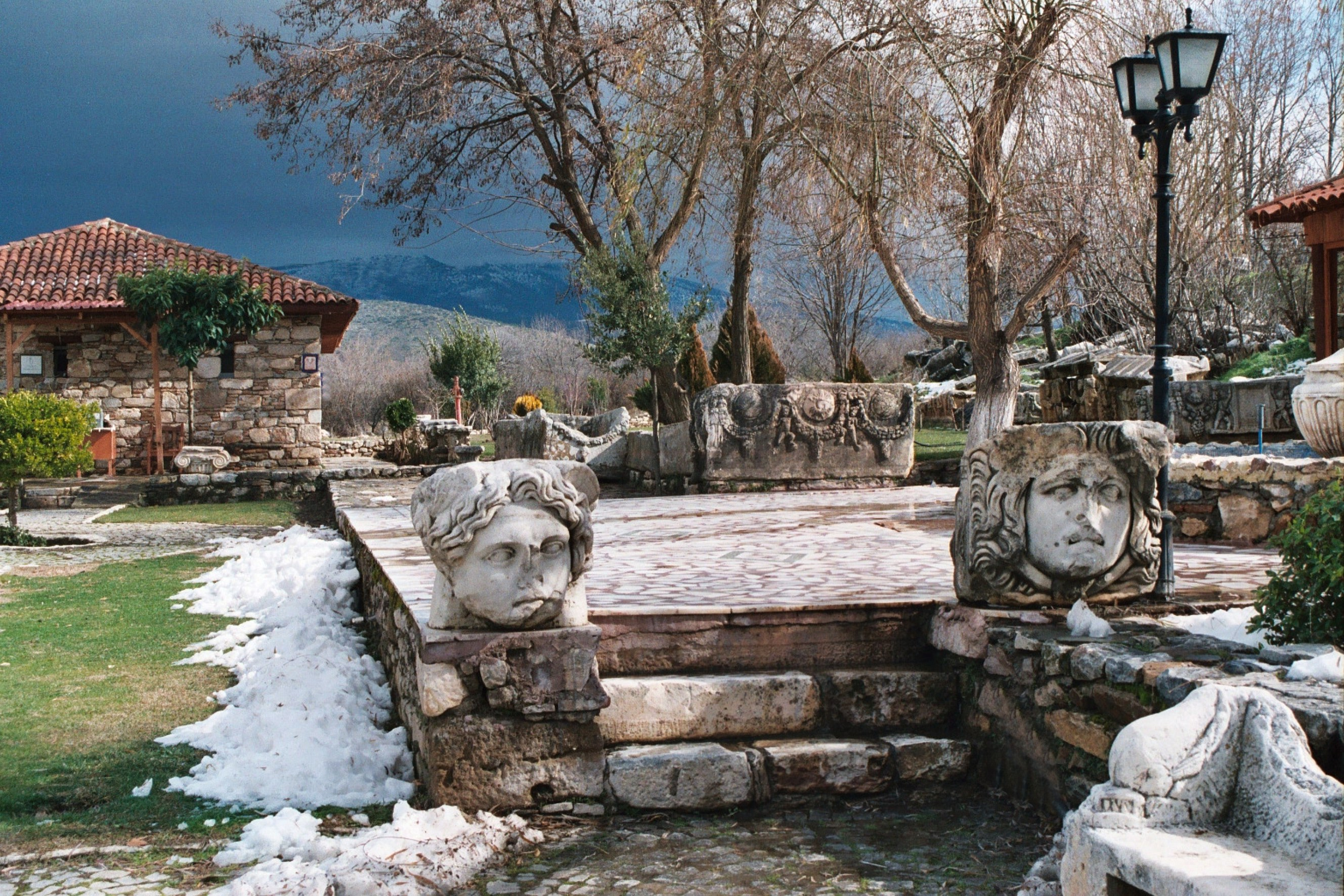
Aphrodisias Stone heads

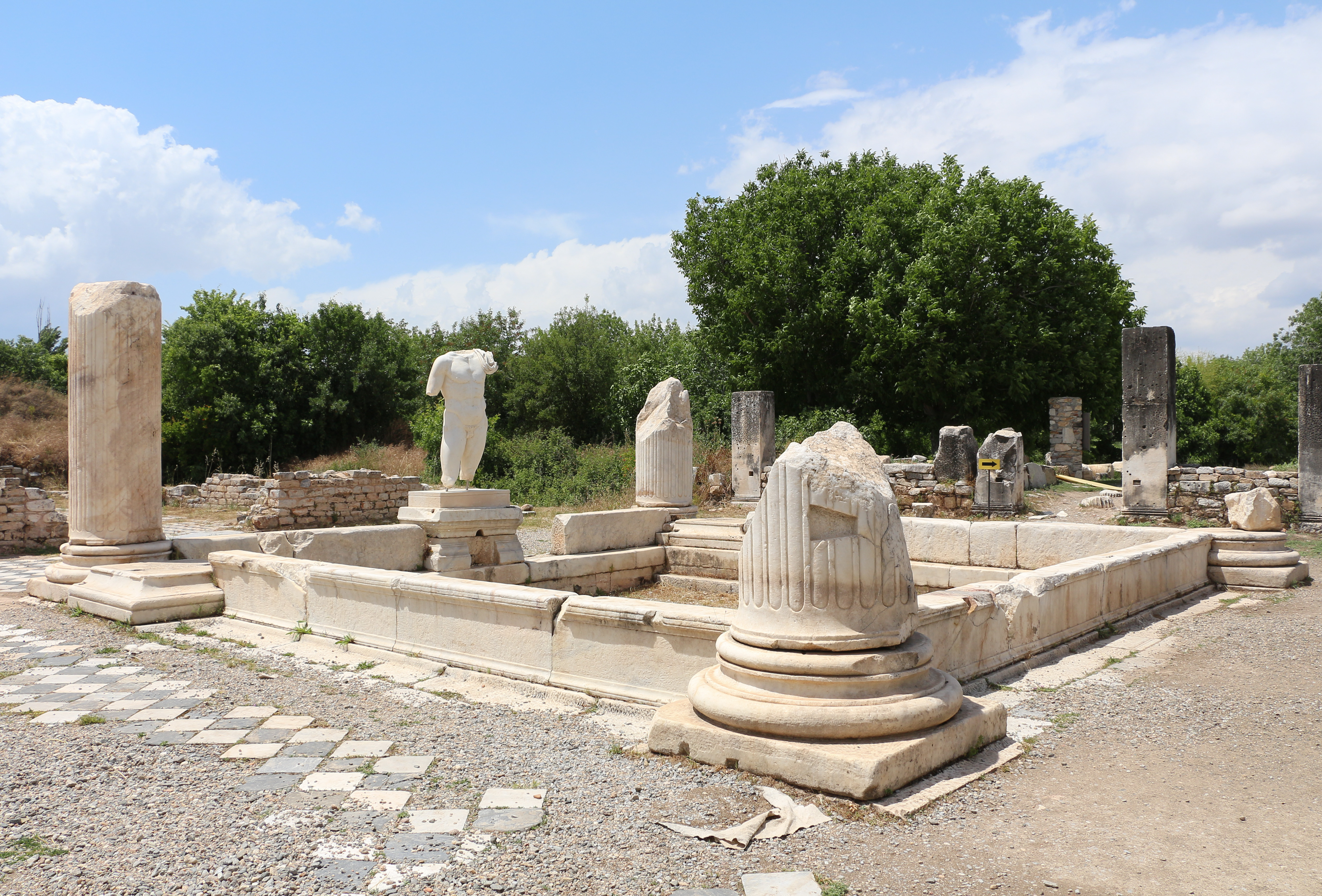
Baths of Hadrianus

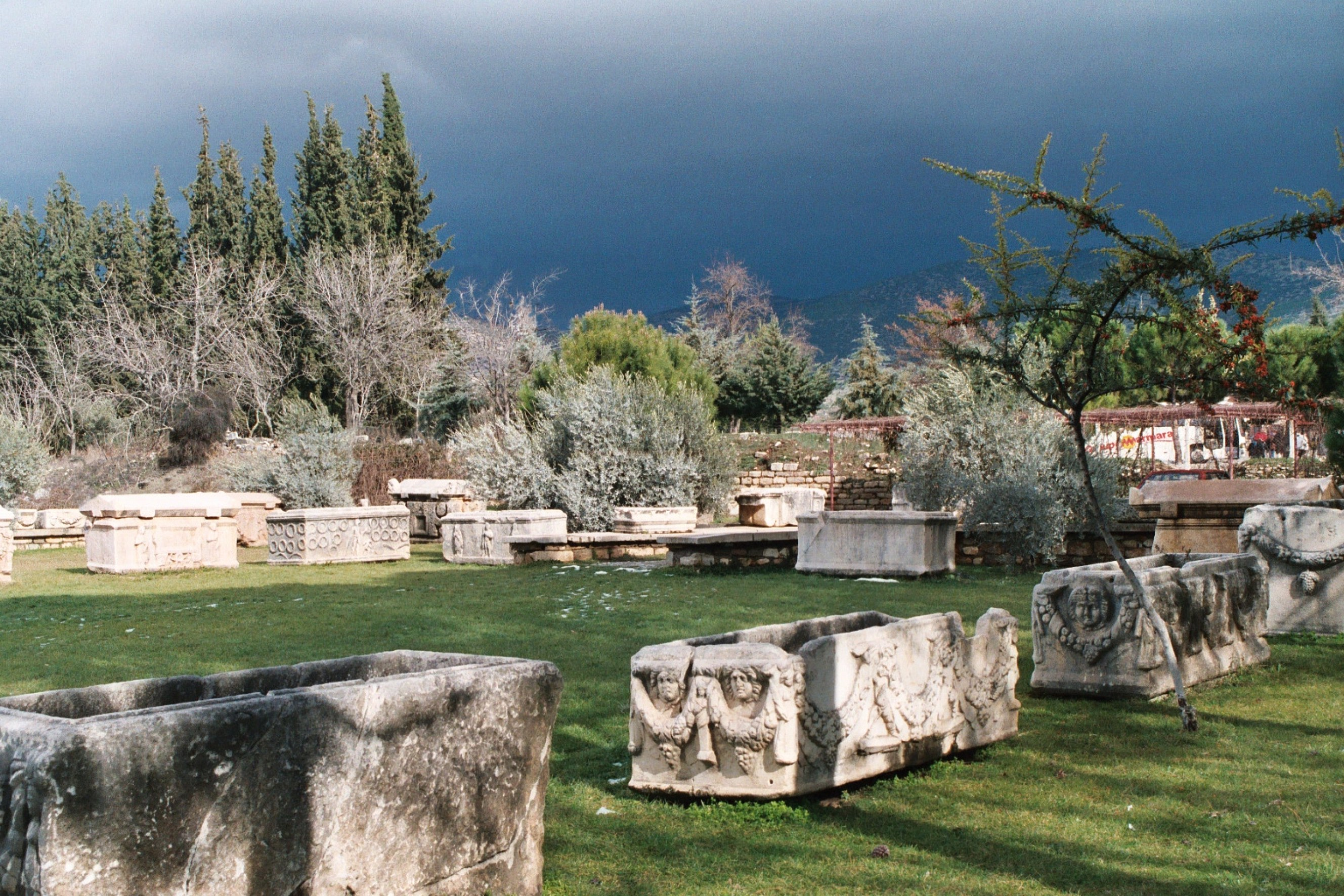
Sarcophagi on site

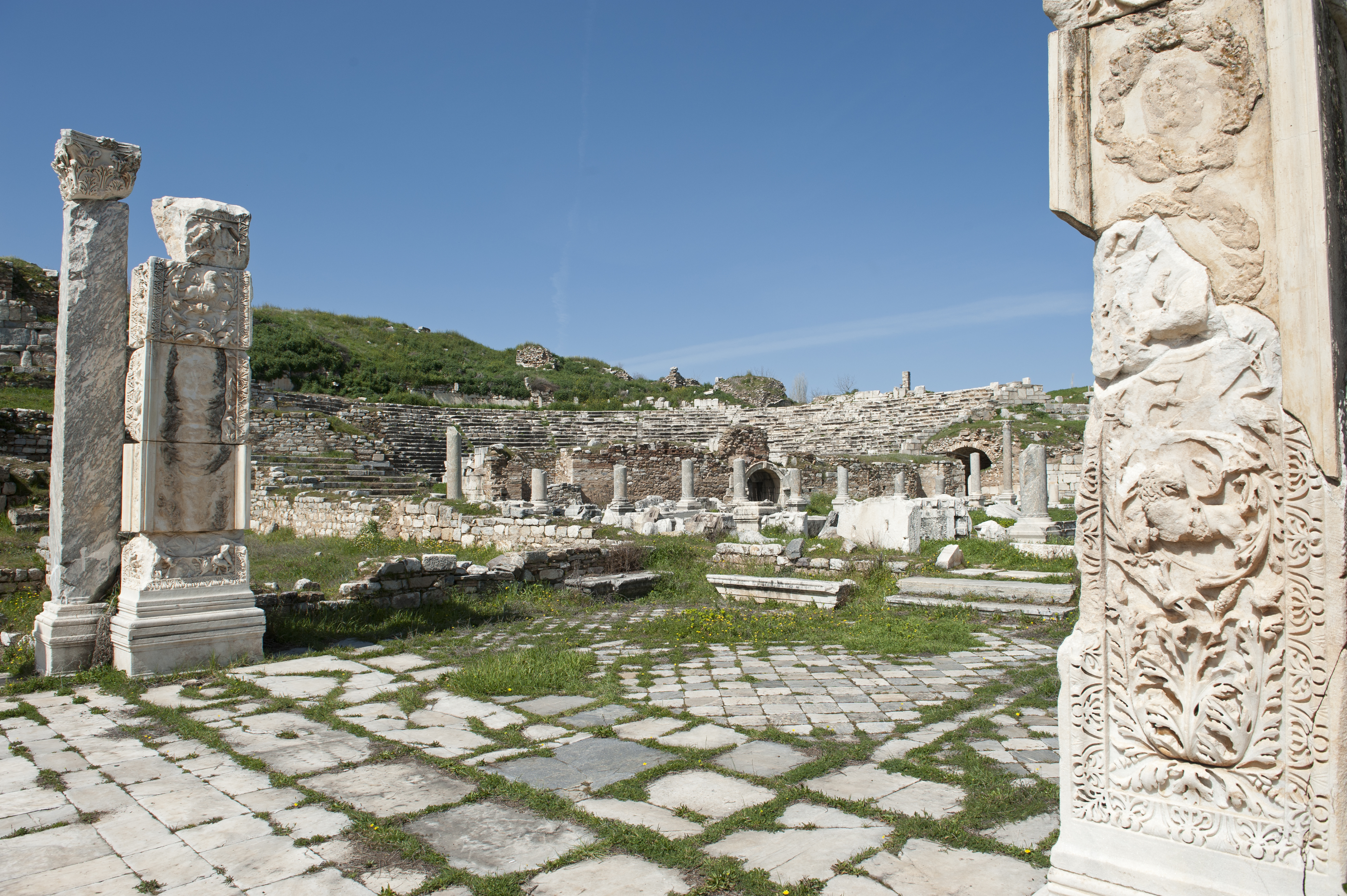
Aphrodisias Tetrastoon

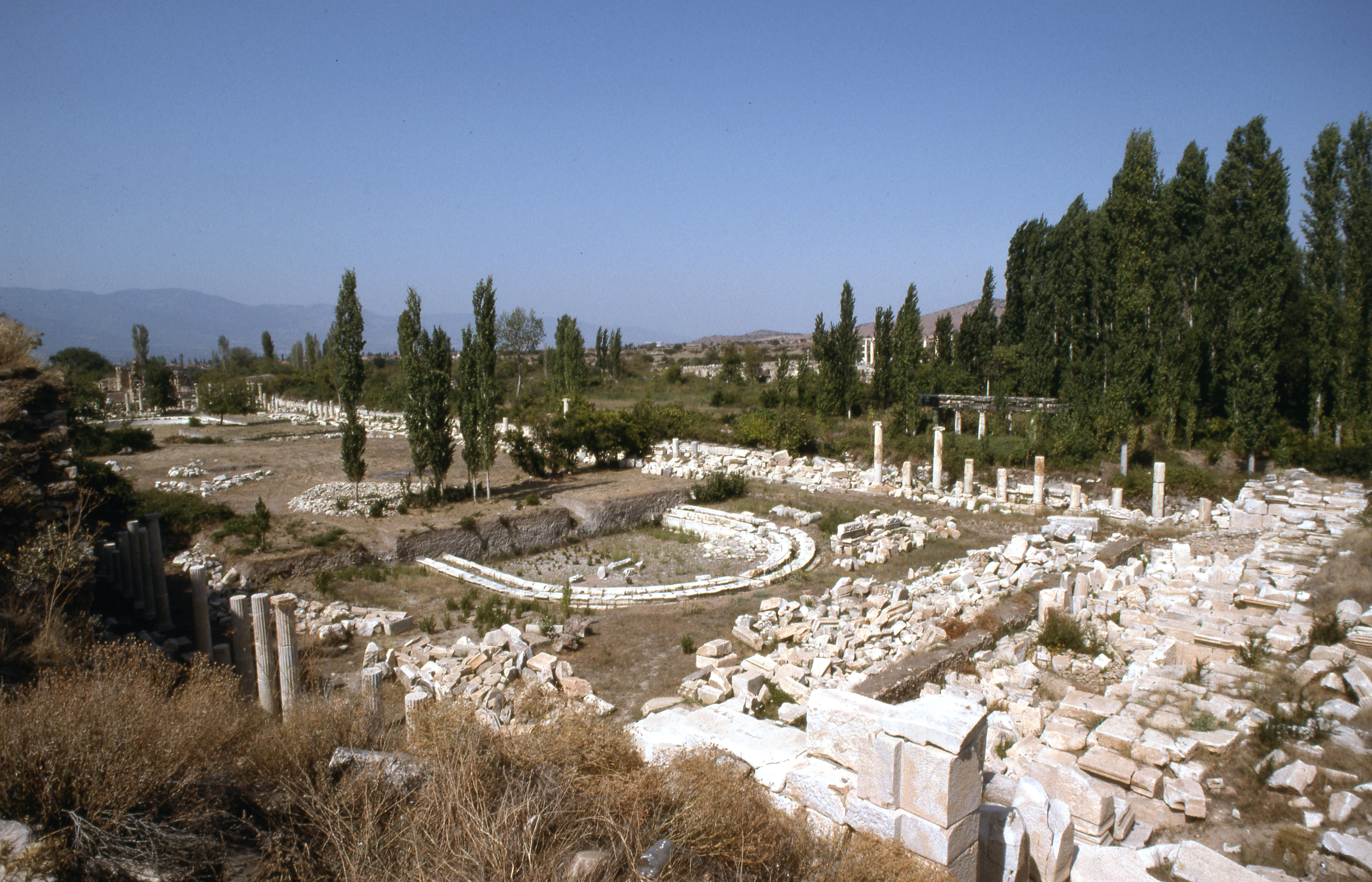
South agora and pool

=== Inscriptions ===
The quality of the marble in Aphrodisias has resulted in an unusually large number of inscribed items surviving in the city. As many pieces of monumental quarried stone were reused in the Late Antique city walls, many inscriptions could and can be easily read without any excavation; the city has therefore been visited and its inscriptions recorded repeatedly in modern times, starting from the early 18th century.

Upwards of 2000 inscriptions have been recorded by excavators under the aegis of New York University. Many of these inscriptions had been re-used in the city walls. Most inscriptions are from the Imperial period, with funerary and honorary texts being particularly well represented, but there are a handful of texts from all periods from the Hellenistic to Byzantine. A set of documents, aimed at portraying the grandeur and history of the city, was included in so-called "Archival Wall".

Excavations in Aphrodisias have also uncovered an important Jewish inscription whose context is unclear. The inscription, in Greek, lists donations made by numerous individuals, of whom several are classed as 'theosebeis', or Godfearers. It seems clear through comparative evidence from the inscriptions in the Sardis synagogue and from the New Testament that such Godfearers were probably interested gentiles who attached themselves to the Jewish community, supporting and perhaps frequenting the synagogue. The geographical spread of the evidence suggests this was a widespread phenomenon in Asia Minor during the Roman period.

=== Frieze ===
A frieze discovered in 1980 showing a bare breasted and helmeted female warrior labelled BRITANNIA writhing in agony under the knee of a Roman soldier with (to the left and below) the inscription TIBERIUS CLAUDIUS CAESAR is assumed to depict Britain subjugated by Rome.

== Aphrodite of Aphrodisias ==
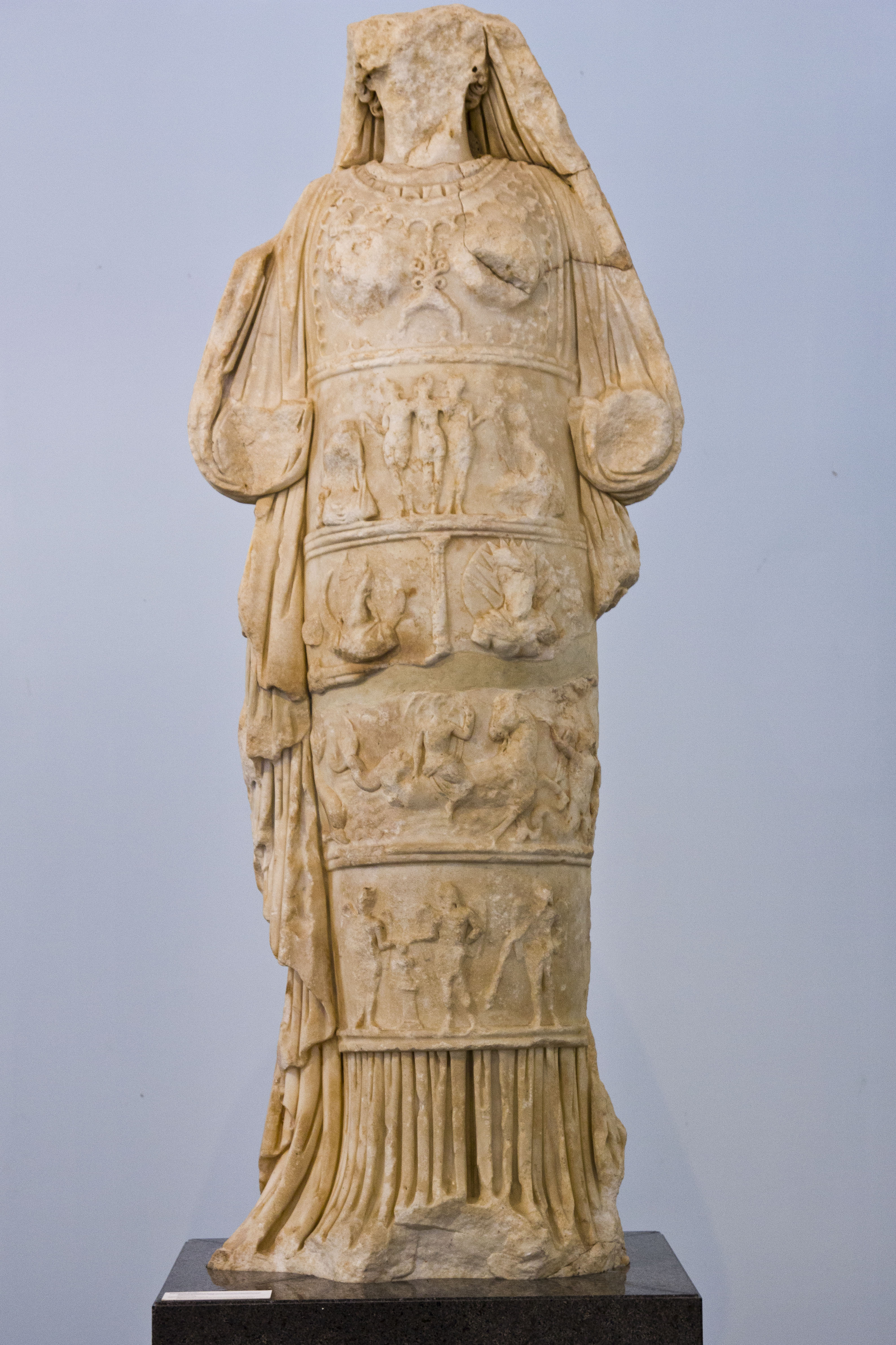
The Aphrodite of Aphrodisias

The cult image that is particular to Aphrodisias, the Aphrodite of Aphrodisias, doubtless was once housed in the Temple of Aphrodite. She was a distinctive local goddess who became, by interpretatio graeca, identified with the Greek Aphrodite. Her canonical image, typical of Anatolian cult images, shows that she is related to the Lady of Ephesus, widely venerated in the Greco-Roman world as Artemis of Ephesus.

The surviving images, from contexts where they must have been more civic than ritual, are without exception from the late phase of the cult, in Hellenistic and Roman times. They are rendered in the naturalistic style common to their culture, which gave the local goddess more universal appeal. Like the Lady of Ephesus, the "Aphrodite" of Aphrodisia wears a thick, form-disguising tunic, encasing her as if in a columnar box, always with four registers of standardized imagery. Her feet are of necessity close together, her forearms stretched forward, to receive and to give. She is adorned with necklaces and wears a mural crown together with a diadem and a wreath of myrtle, draped with a long veil that frames her face and extends to the ground. Beneath her overtunic she wears a floor-length chiton.

The bands of decoration on the tunic, rendered in bas-relief, evoke the Goddess's cosmic powers: the Charites, the Three Graces that are the closest attendants of Aphrodite; heads of a married pair (the woman is veiled), identified by Lisa Brody as Gaia and Uranos, Earth and the Heavens, over which this goddess reigns, rather than as Zeus and Hera; Helios and Selene separated by a pillar; the marine Aphrodite, riding a sea-goat, and at the base a group of Erotes performing cult rituals.

== Notable people ==
- Attilianus, sculptor
- Chariton (1st century AD), novelist and author of Chaereas and Callirhoe
- Adrastus (fl. 2nd century AD), peripatetic philosopher
- Alexander (died 3rd century AD), peripatetic philosopher and commentator on Aristotle

== Gallery ==
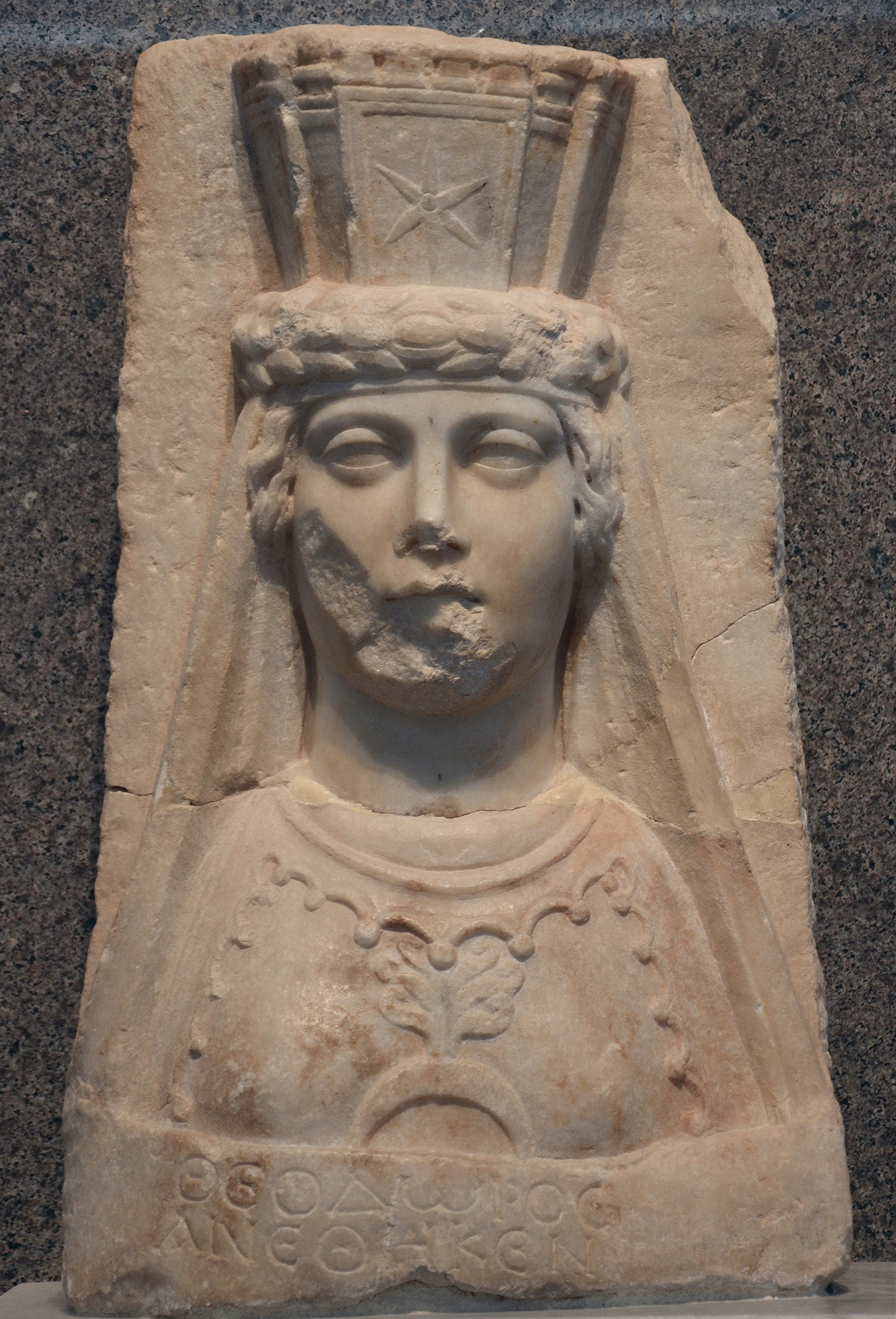
Aphrodite of Aphrodisias originated in the Archaic period or earlier as a local Carian goddess

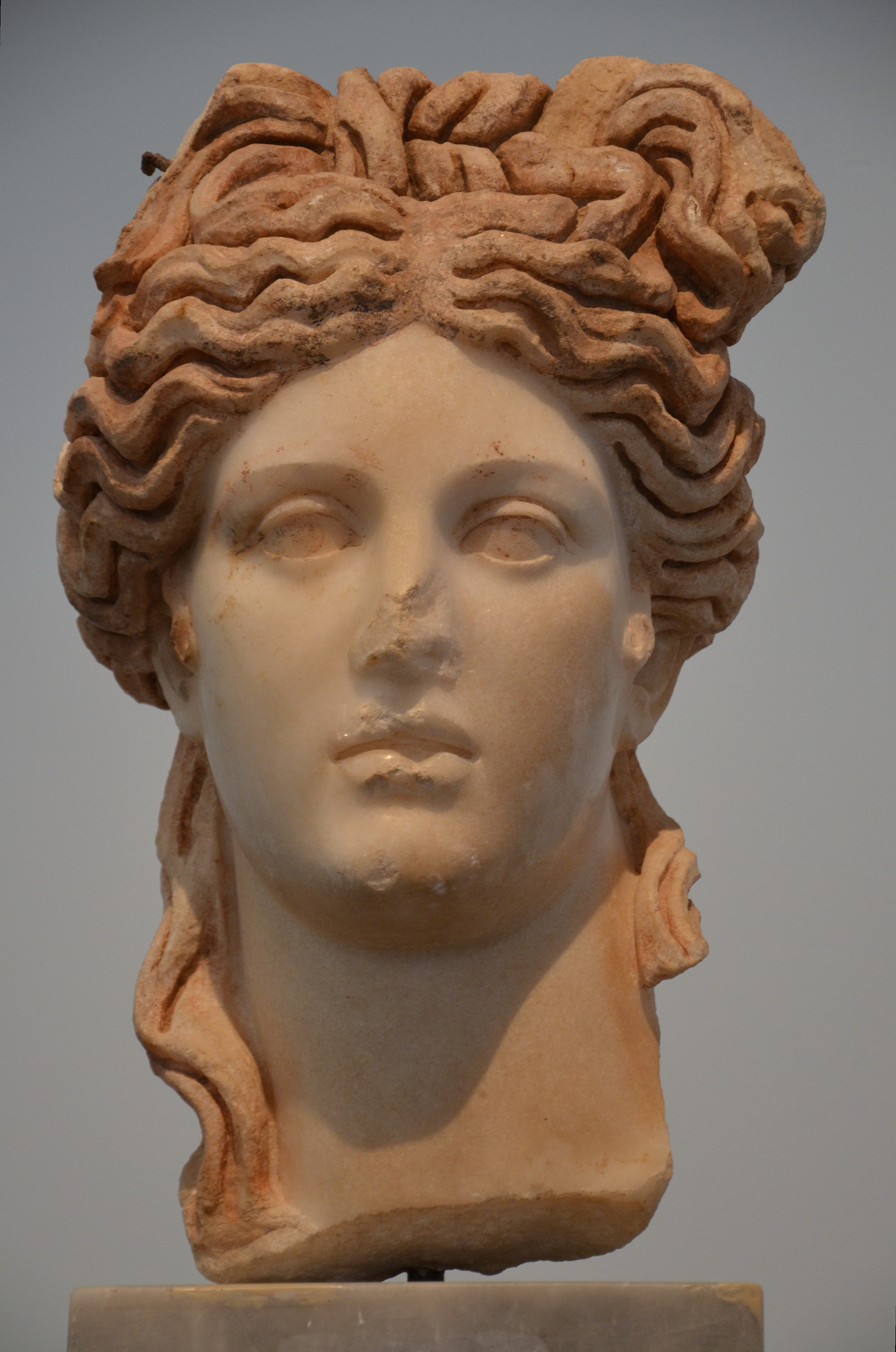
Marble head of a goddess, found in the Hadrianic Baths, 2nd century AD

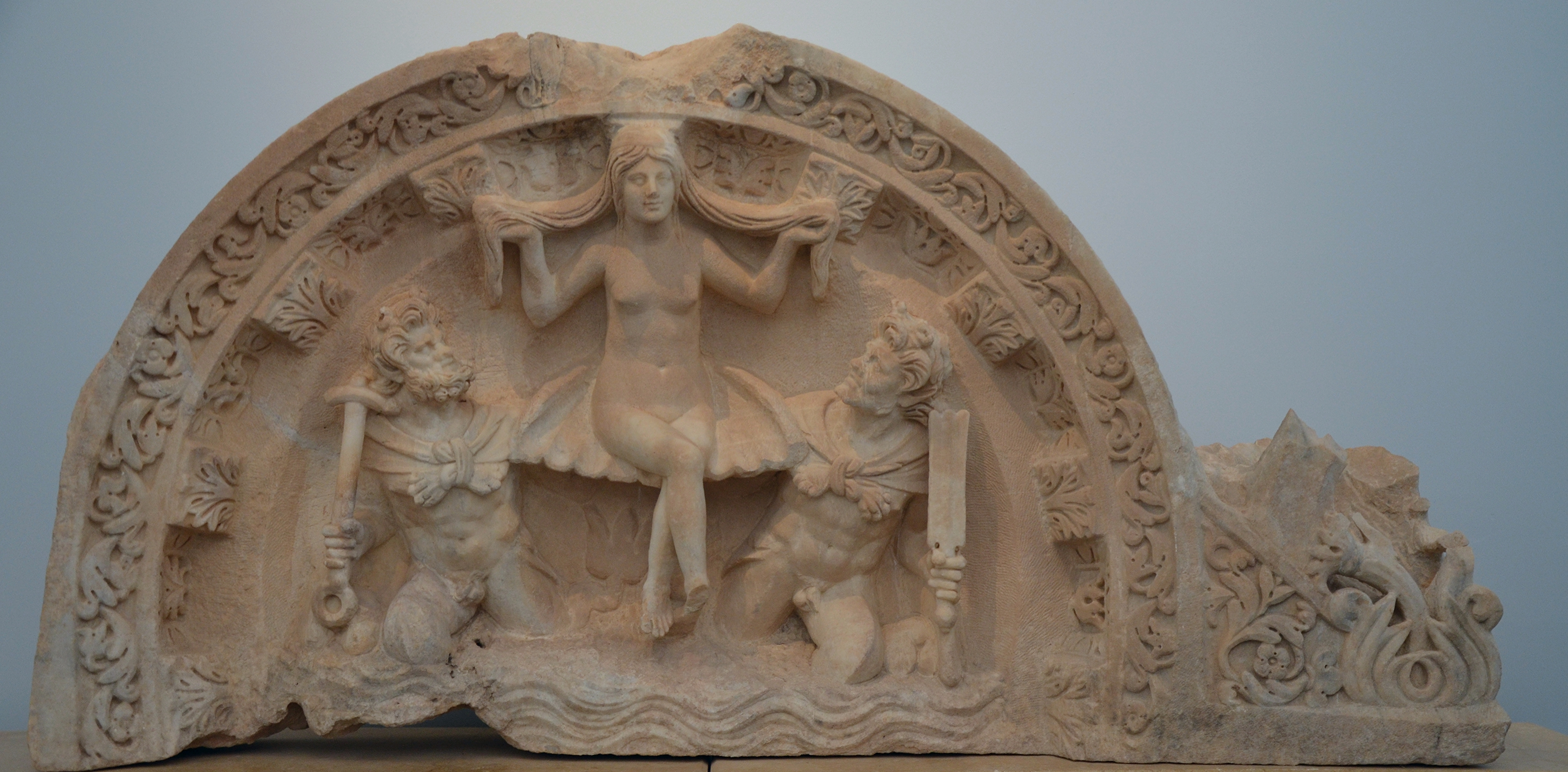
Relief depicting the birth of Aphrodite (Aphrodite Anadyomene), Aphrodisias Museum

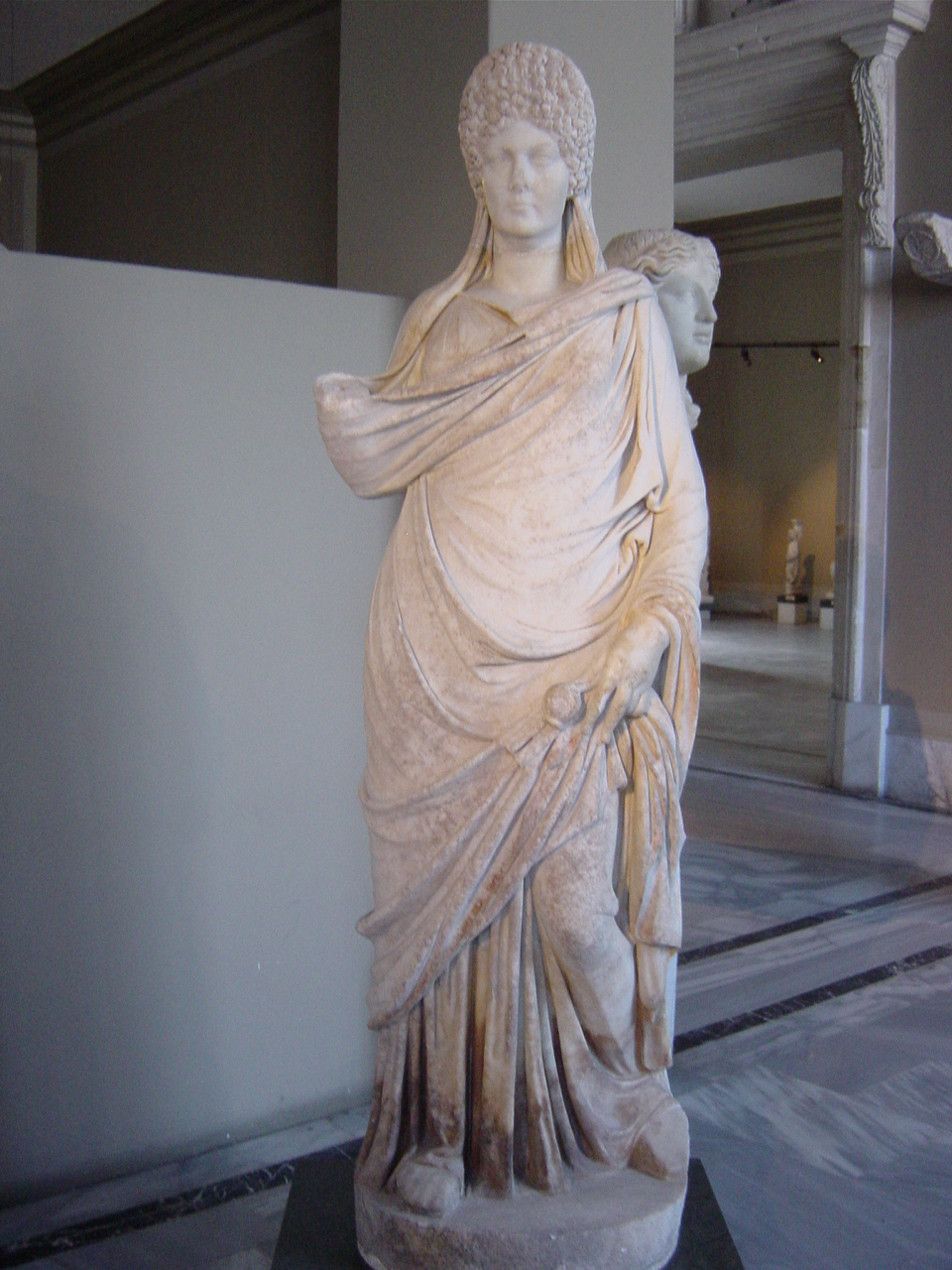
Unknown Roman matrona, 2nd century AD. from Aphrodisias, now presented in Istanbul Archaeological Museum

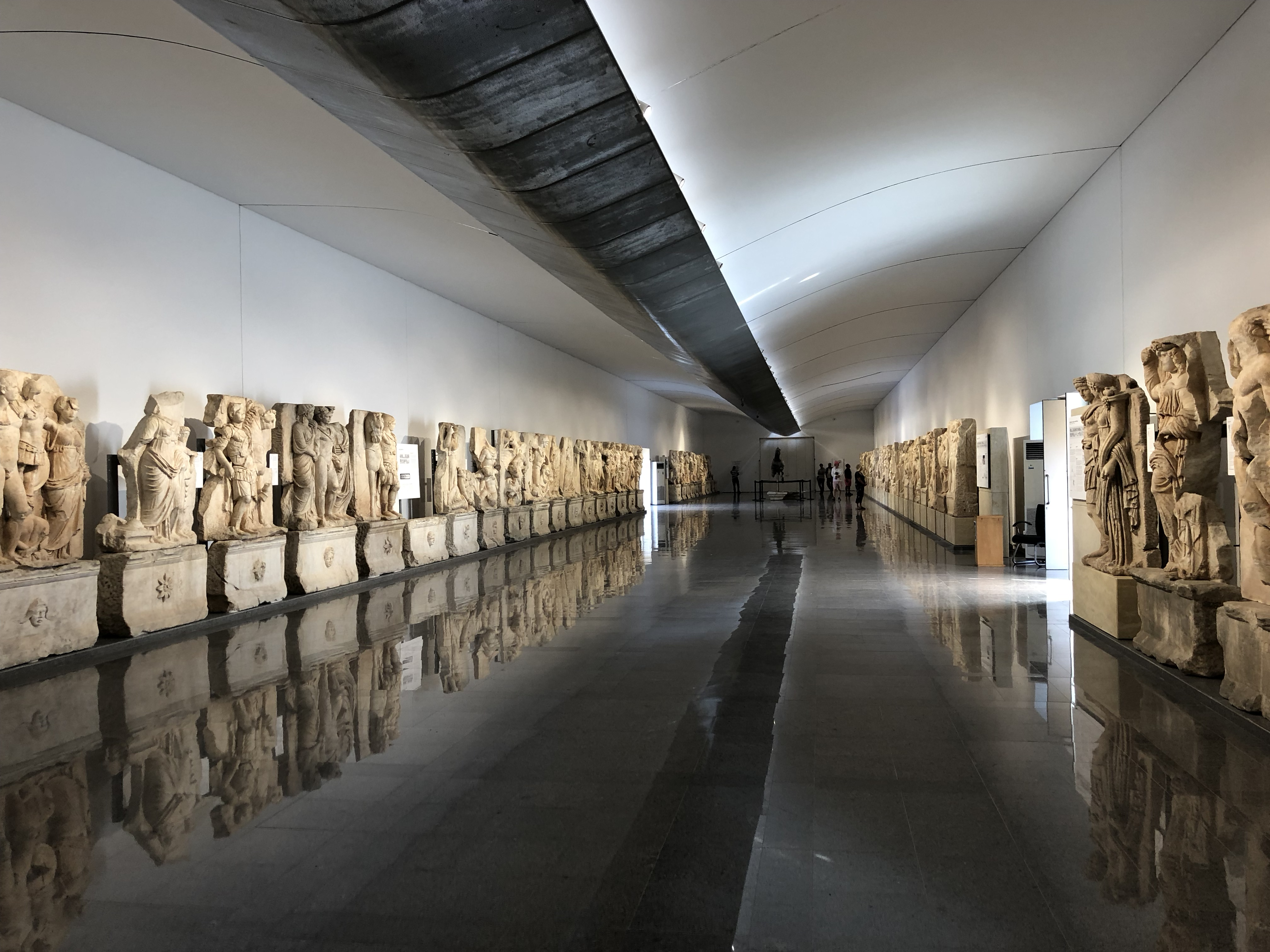
Aphrodisias Museum Sevgi Gönül Hall. This hall contains items from the Sebasteion structure

== See also ==
- Alexander of Aphrodisias
- Chariton, whose novel Chaereas and Callirhoe reflects the power structure of Aphrodisias in the 1st-2nd century
- List of World Heritage Sites in Turkey
