= Adrastus of Aphrodisias =

2nd-century Greek philosopher

- Born: fl. 2nd century CE

Philosophical work
- Era: Ancient philosophy
- Region: Ancient Roman philosophy
- School: Peripatetic school
- Main interests: Harmonics

Adrastus of Aphrodisias (Greek: Ἄδραστος ὁ Ἀφροδισιεύς; fl. 2nd century) was a Peripatetic philosopher who lived in the first half of the 2nd century AD.

He was the author of a treatise on the arrangement of Aristotle's writings and his system of philosophy which was quoted by Simplicius, and by Achilles Tatius. Some commentaries of his on the Timaeus of Plato are also quoted by Porphyry, which was also used by Theon of Smyrna in the surviving sections of his On Mathematics Useful for the Understanding of Plato, and a treatise on the Categories of Aristotle by Galen.

None of these works have survived. In some medieval manuscripts, a work with the title Harmonica was attributed to Adrastus, however, this was a misattribution of a work by Manuel Bryennios.

== Ancient testimony ==
- Theon of Smyrna (1979). Mathematics Useful for Understanding Plato. Translated by Toulis, Christos. Wizards Bookshelf. ISBN 978-0-913510-24-7.
- Athenaeus, Deipnosophistae 15.15
- Porphyry, Commentary on Ptolemy's Harmonics
- Simplicius, Commentary on Aristotle's Categories
