= Geyre =

- Neighbourhood
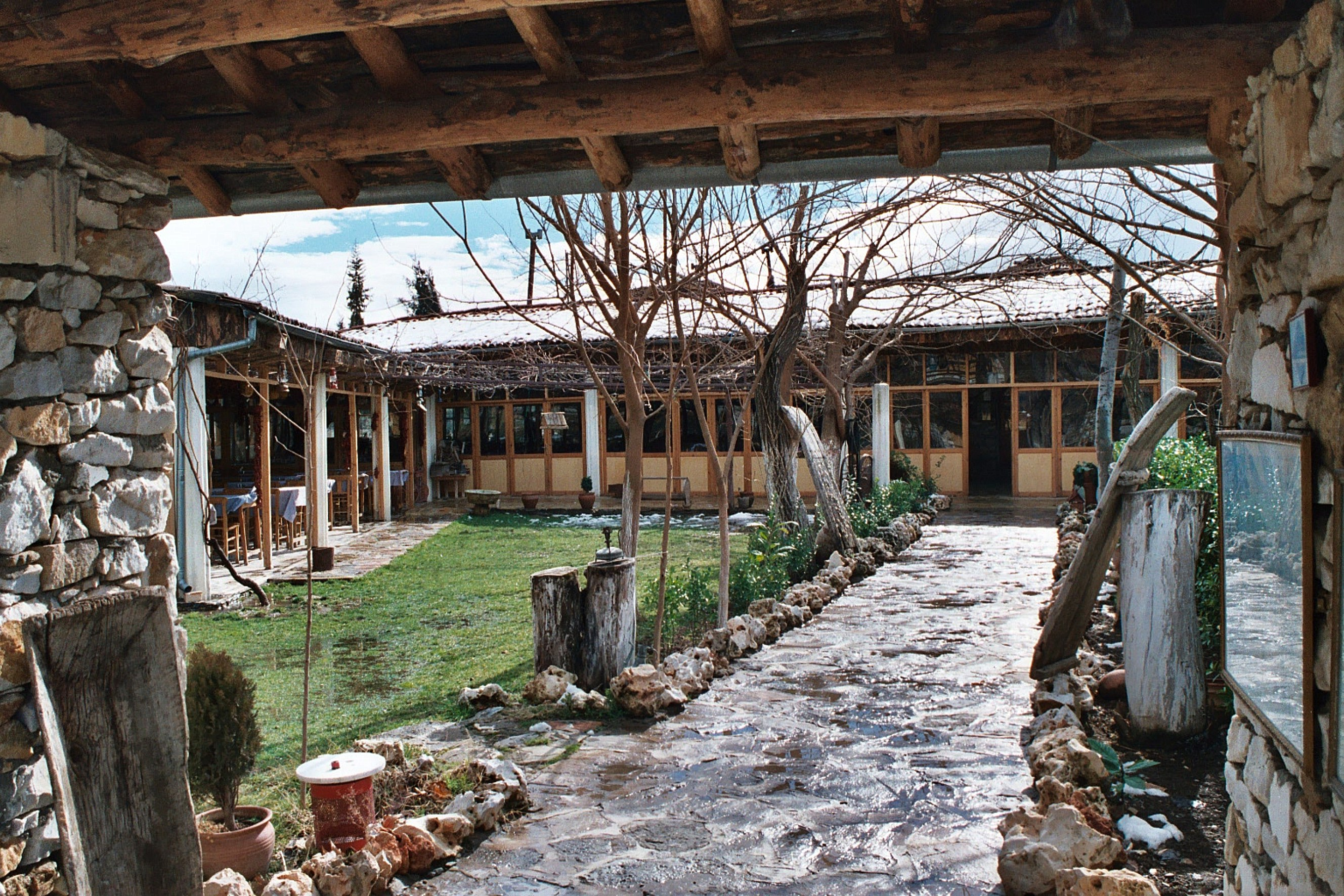
- A restaurant in Geyre

- Location within Turkey Location within Turkey Aegean
- Coordinates: 37°43′N 28°43′E
- Country: Turkey
- Province: Aydın
- District: Karacasu
- Population (2022): 774
- Time zone: UTC+3 (TRT)

Geyre is a neighbourhood of the municipality and district of Karacasu, Aydın Province, Turkey. Its population is 774 (2022). Before the 2013 reorganisation, it was a town (belde). Also known as Yeni koy (the "new village"), it was relocated around 1960, from over the ancient Greek city of Aphrodisias archaeological site to a new location nearby.

It is about 230 km (140 mi) south-east of İzmir, and about 100 km (62 mi) inland/east from the coast of the Aegean Sea.

== History ==
Previously called Ninoé, Aphrodisias, and Stravopolis in the ancient Caria region, the Turkish village of "Old Geyre" emerged by the late 18th century CE when settlers were attracted to the area due to fertile soil and plentiful water. It is a settlement which was developed over the ruins of the ancient Greek city of Aphrodisias. Aphrodisias was established in the 4th century BCE.

== Relocation ==
The new village of Geyre was relocated from the "Old Geyre" location, and built by the Turkish government c. 1960, due to earthquake threats to its stone dwellings, and to protect the rediscovered (1957) archaeological site and antiquities of a Bronze Age (3,000-2200 BCE) settlement, ancient Greek and Roman Aphrodisias, and Byzantine Stravopolis (c.3rd−c.12th centuries).

The village was relocated when excavations began again on the ruins of Aphrodisias.

== See also ==
- Carians — Pre-Hellenic
