= Aphrodisias Museum =

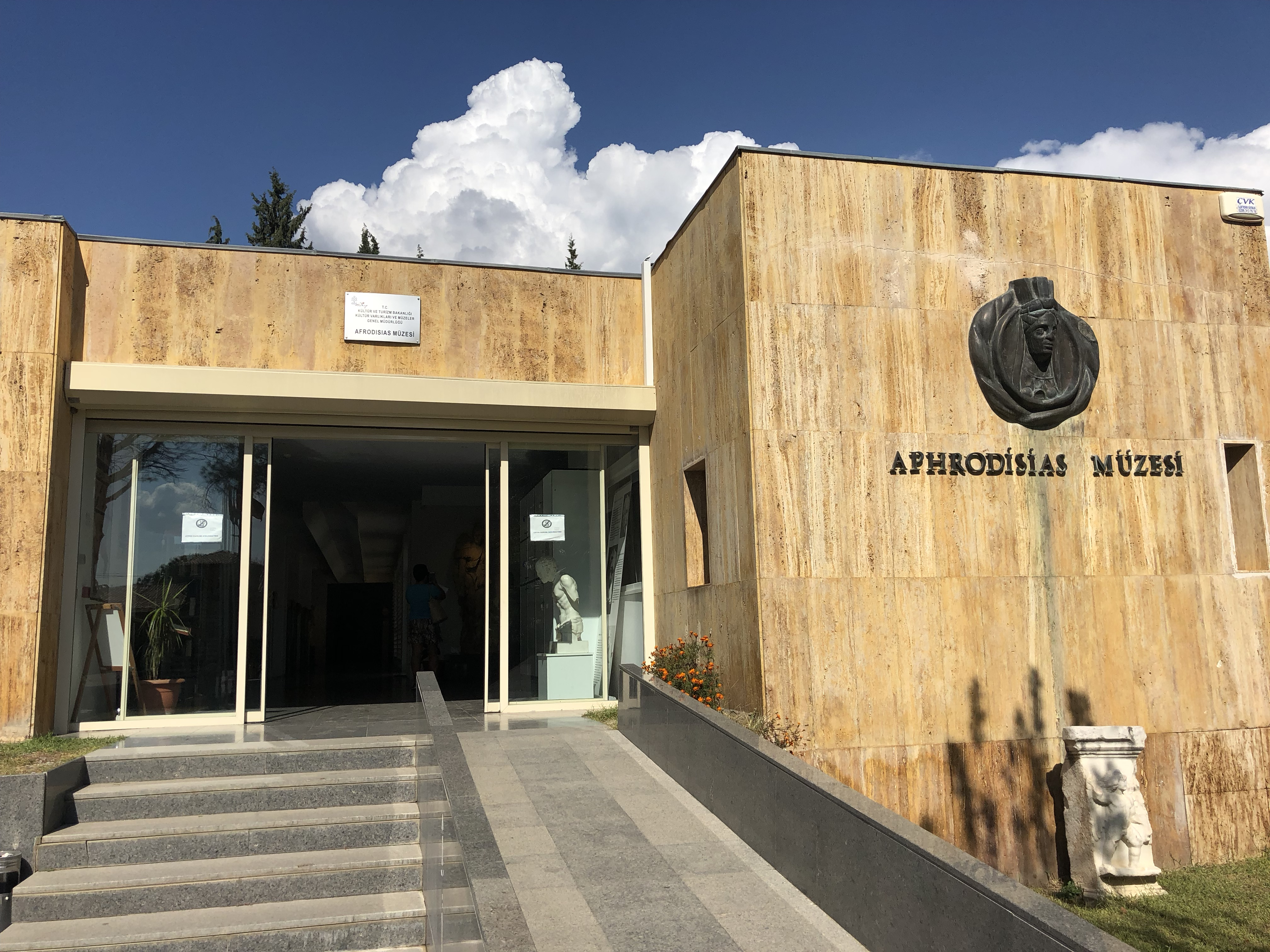
- Aphrodisias Museum building
- Location: Turkey
- Coordinates: 37°42′34″N 28°43′38″E
- Location of Aphrodisias Museum

Aphrodisias Museum is an archaeological museum located within the archaeological site of Aphrodisias in Geyre, Karacasu, which exhibits works crafted from white and blue-gray marble in the Ancient period in Hellenistic-Roman cities from the 1st century BCE to the 5th century CE, such as reliefs of Nero, Agrippina the Younger, Claudio, Augustus or Tiberius from the Sebasteion.

It also includes sculptures which depicts tragic scenes from Trojan War such as Achilles and Pentasilla, satyr statues carrying Dionysus, and reliefs from the monumental tomb of Zolios. It covers prehistoric artifacts from the Chalcolithic and Bronze Age excavated at the Acropolis Hill and Pekmez Hill mounds, Lydian ceramics, Archaic, Classical, and Hellenistic period artifacts, and Roman, Byzantine, and Early Islamic artifacts.
