= Early life of Augustus =

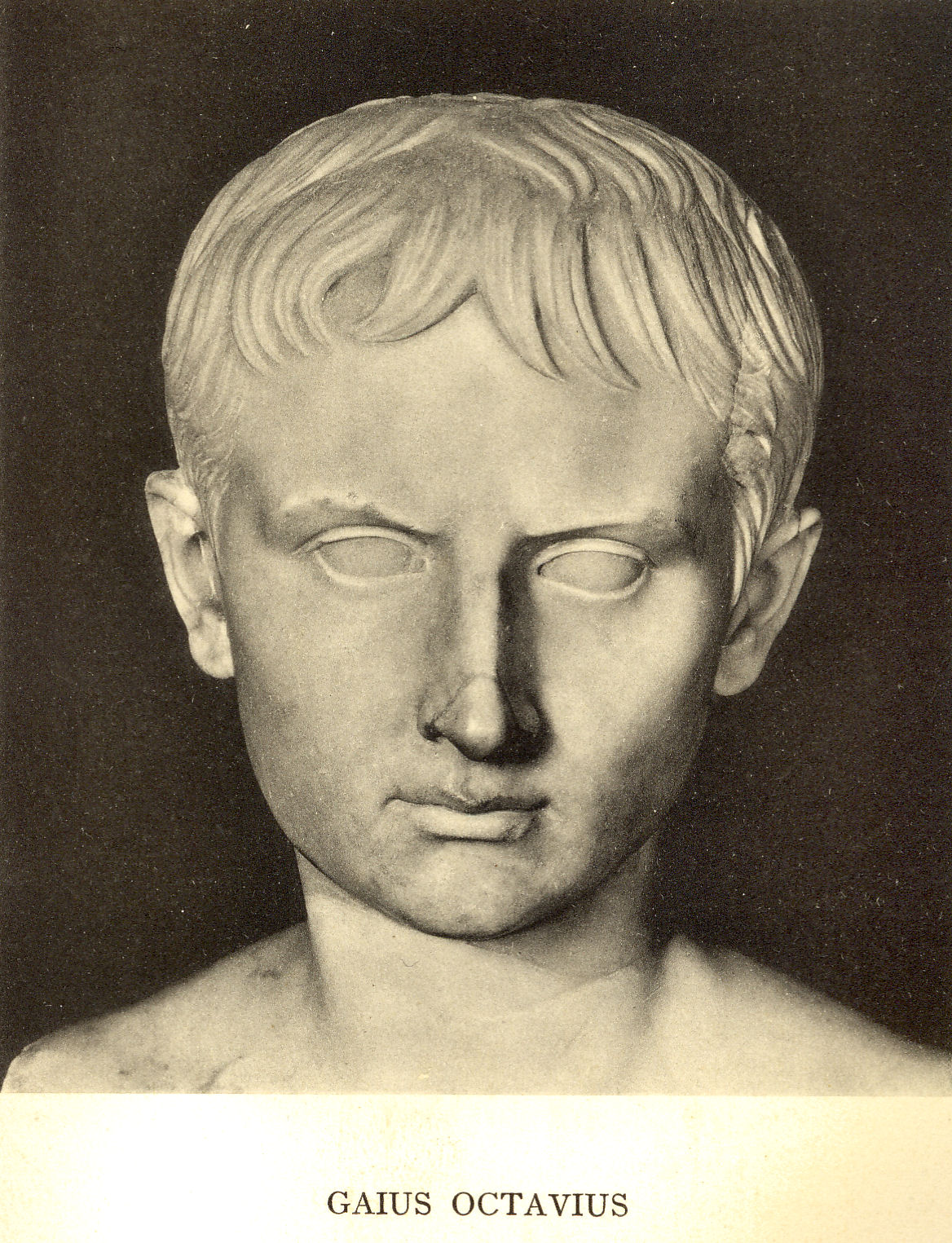
An idealized Roman sculpted portrait of young Octavius as a teenager, possibly produced posthumously or when he was much older, now located in the Vatican Museums

Augustus, the first Roman emperor, was born in Rome on 23 September 63 BC as Gaius Octavius. In his early childhood he was raised by his parents, Gaius Octavius and Atia, but after the elder Octavius's death he was raised in part by his stepfather Lucius Marcius Philippus and his grandmother Julia. In his youth he was provided an education in Greek and Latin rhetoric, mathematics, and philosophy.

Dictator Julius Caesar, Octavius's great-uncle, helped foster his early career after Octavius donned the toga virilis at age 15 to mark his coming of age as an adult citizen. Caesar had Octavius elected to the College of Pontiffs, ride in his chariot during a triumph, and accompany him on a military campaign in Hispania. Caesar named Octavius as his primary heir in his will, but was assassinated on the Ides of March in 44 BC while Octavius was studying and undergoing military training at Apollonia in Illyria. Afterwards, Octavius sailed back to Italy to claim his inheritance as the rightful heir to Caesar, and is labeled by historians at this stage with the name Octavian. Ultimately victorious after a series of civil wars, he would eventually be named Augustus by the Roman Senate in 27 BC, an event that traditionally marks the end of the Roman Republic and beginning of the Roman Empire.

== Childhood and education ==
=== Birth, upbringing, and primary sources ===
Augustus was born Gaius Octavius in Rome on 23 September 63 BC. Historians Anne-Marie Lewis and Karl Galinsky explain how there is scholarly debate surrounding Octavius's precise date of birth. Evidence that it had occurred on 22 September is based on statements by historians such as Suetonius and Velleius Paterculus, though Cassius Dio affirms it occurred on 23 September, and confusion also stems from the transition of using the early Republican Roman calendar to using the Julian Calendar during Octavius's lifetime. Most Roman histories gloss over the childhood of Octavius. Some details about his upbringing from his now-lost autobiography were preserved by Suetonius. However, the majority of information is preserved in a biography composed by Nicolaus of Damascus around 20 BC. This biography has only partially survived in 10th-century Byzantine excerpts, namely the Excerpta Constantiniana. Appian and Cassius Dio provide information about the rise of Augustus as a triumvir, while Cassius Dio and Tacitus focus on Augustus's role as princeps and reign as the first Roman emperor.

=== Family and ancestry ===
Octavius was a member of the respectable, but undistinguished, equestrian Octavii family through his father, also named Gaius Octavius. The younger Octavius was also the great-nephew of Julius Caesar through his mother Atia. Octavius had two older siblings: a half sister, Octavia Major, from his father's first marriage, and a full sister, Octavia Minor. His paternal family was from the Volscian town of Velitrae (modern Velletri), approximately 40 kilometres (25 mi) south-east of the city. He was born at Ox Head, a small property on the Palatine Hill, very close to the Roman Forum. For at least a portion of his childhood he was raised in his family's hometown of Velitrae.

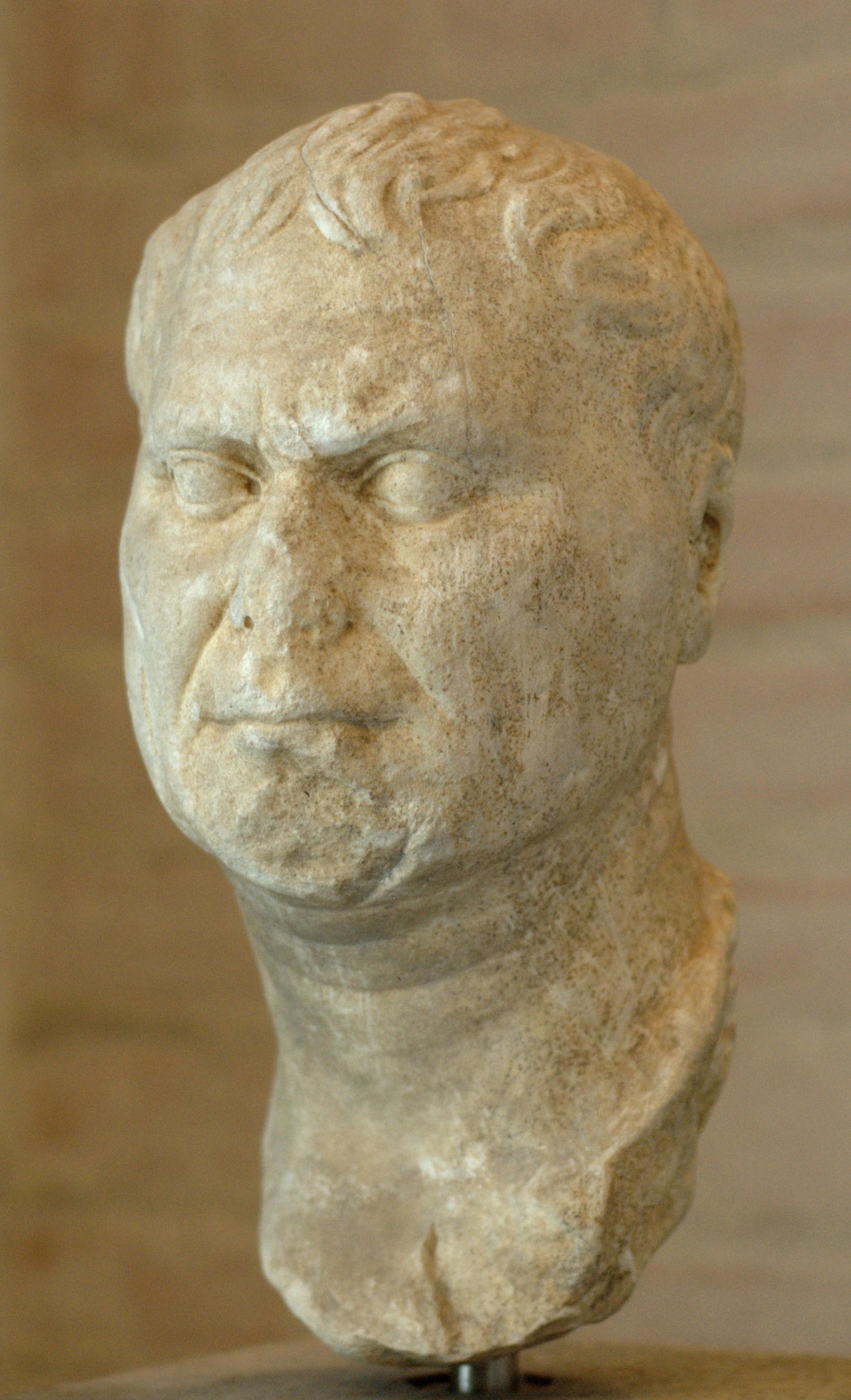
Head of statue, thought to be Gaius Octavius, father of Octavius, c. 60 BC, Munich Glyptothek

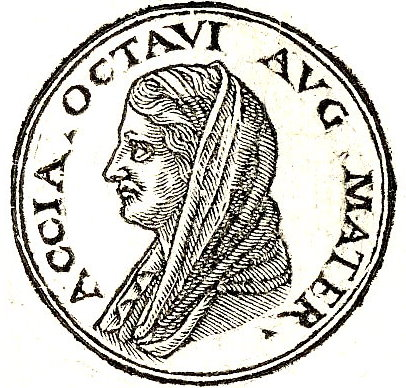
A depiction of Atia from the Promptuarii Iconum Insigniorum

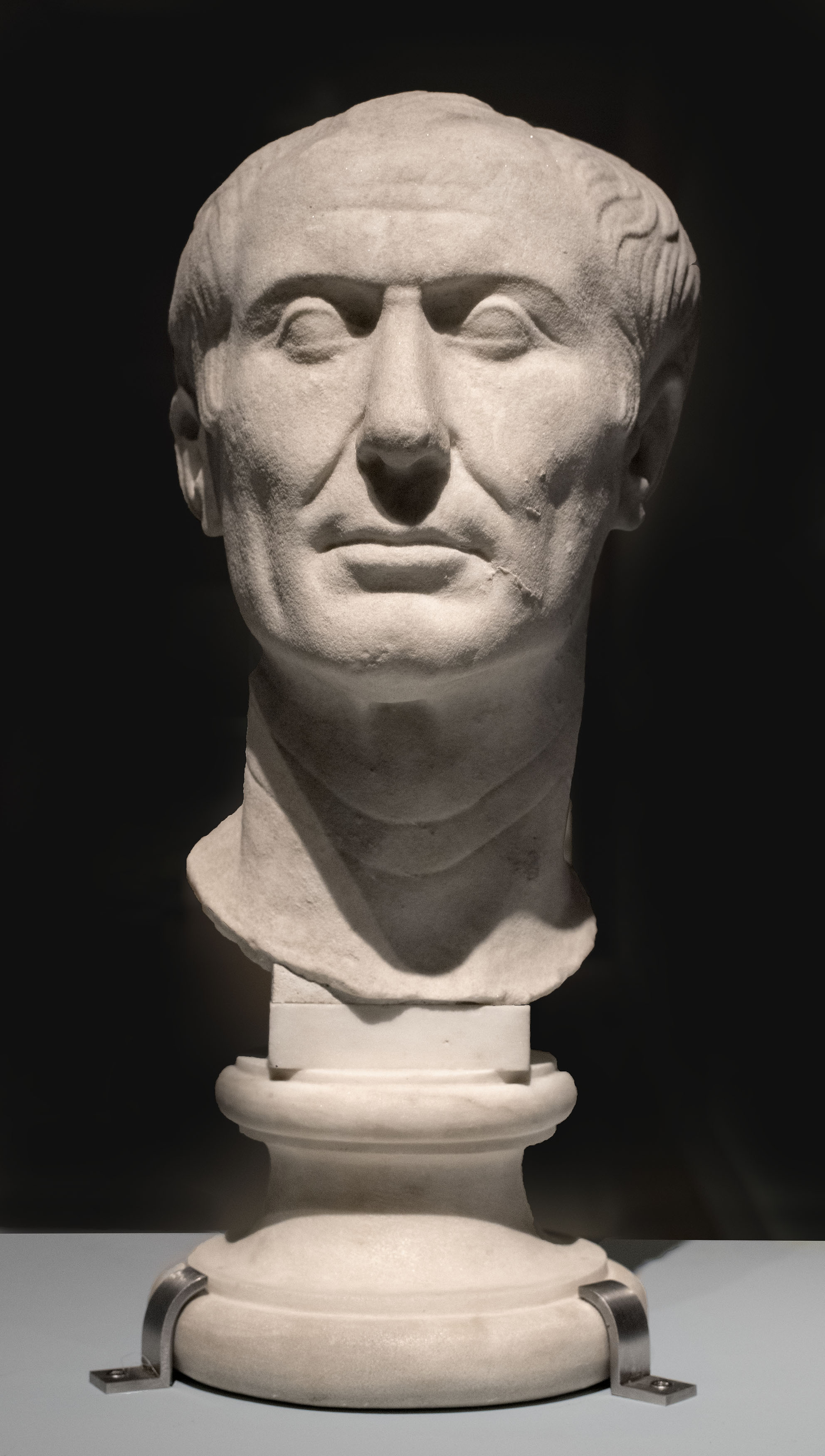
The Tusculum portrait, a sculpture of Julius Caesar made during his lifetime, Archaeological Museum of Turin, Italy

Octavius's paternal great-grandfather Octavius was a military tribune in Sicily during the Second Punic War. His grandfather was a banker. However, the family entered the senatorial ranks with Octavius's father, the elder Octavius, as its novus homo. The elder Octavius's entrance into the Senate came when he was appointed quaestor. He ascended the Cursus honorum as quaestor c. 73, aedile c. 64, and praetor in 61 BC, before being made proconsular governor of Macedonia, where he was proclaimed imperator for victories against the Thracian Bessi tribe on its frontiers.

In his childhood, Octavius may have received the cognomen "Thurinus" to commemorate his father's victory at Thurii over a rebellious band of slaves who were followers of Spartacus. Later, after he had taken the name of Caesar, his rival Mark Antony referred to him as Thurinus in order to belittle him. However, Antony did so by insinuating Octavius's great-grandfather was a mere plebeian rope-maker at Thurii, a dismissive insult based on social class. (Note: Historian Patricia Southern contends that "Marcus Antonius used to insult Octavius by calling him the Thurian, asserting that his great-grandfather had a rope-walk or rope factory at Thurii, and Suetonius reports a graffito on the base of [sic] bronze statue of Augustus implying that his father was a dealer in bronze. The connection with low-class activities such as rope-making and bronze-dealing of course casts aspersions on Octavius's ancestry, since the reputation of senators depended on the fact that they never sullied their hands by engaging in work, which was in fact prohibited".)

=== Tutelage and coming of age ===
The elder Octavius proved himself a capable administrator in Macedonia. Upon returning to Italy, before he could stand for consulship, he suddenly died in Nola in 59 BC, or in 58 BC, when Octavius was only four or five years old. (Note: Luc (2024, p. 133) provides two dates, 59 and 58 BC, while Shotter (2005, pp. 1–2) says 58 BC only, and Chisholm & Ferguson (1981, p. 23), Southern (2014, pp. 7, 9), and Galinsky (2012, p. xv) say 59 BC.) In 58 BC Octavius's mother Atia married a former governor of Syria, Lucius Marcius Philippus. Philippus came from a leading family in Rome and was elected consul in 56 BC. According to Galinsky, as Octavius's stepfather, Philippus likely served as a role model in how to delicately navigate troubled political waters while preserving his personal wealth. It is also likely Octavius was partly raised by his grandmother Julia, the sister of Julius Caesar. When Julia died in 52 or 51 BC, Octavius delivered her funeral oration, his first major public appearance. Historian Patricia Southern adds that such a move carried political connotations for Octavius:

When his grandmother Julia died he delivered the funeral oration for her, probably aged about 11. It was his first public appearance. The content of the speech that Octavius made is unknown; it would not necessarily be absolutely accurate, since the main purpose was aggrandisement of the family. He would have known, or been told at this time, that Caesar had also made a similar funerary oration for his own aunt Julia, the wife of Gaius Marius, and he had done so at a time when connection with Marius was downright unhealthy, if not actually lethal. Funeral speeches were as much political gestures as they were acts of piety.

Historian Adrian Goldsworthy concurs about the political importance of the eulogy. However, he insists that it was delivered in 51 BC when Octavius was 12 years old. He also does not mention the political context that includes Gaius Marius.

Octavius was educated in reading, writing, arithmetic, and the Greek language by a Greek slave tutor named Sphaerus, who Octavius later freed from slavery and honored with a state funeral in 40 BC. Galinsky claims Sphaerus educated Octavius in the household of his stepfather Philippus, whereas Goldsworthy claims Sphaerus educated Octavius in the household of Atia's parents. As a teenager he studied philosophy under the tutelage of Areios of Alexandria and Athenodorus of Tarsus, Latin rhetoric under Marcus Epidius, and Greek rhetoric under Apollodorus of Pergamon. In 48 or 47 BC Octavius donned the toga virilis ('toga of manhood'). Southern explains the discrepancy among primary sources for the age in which Octavius was allowed to wear the toga virilis:

In Rome, Octavius assumed the toga virilis on 18 October, at the age of 15...The coming of age was a public, formal ceremony, during which boys laid aside the toga praetexta that marked their youth, and became officially enrolled as adult citizens. The normal age was 17, which was also the age when military service began, and the legal age at which a man could be prosecuted. In the early Empire, the lowering of the age of the assumption of the toga virilis was regarded as a distinction of honour, and Augustus' grandsons Gaius and Lucius assumed it at the same age as Octavius at 15. Nicolaus of Damascus gives Octavius' age as only 14 when the ceremony took place, but the evidence from Suetonius weighs against this".

Galinsky claims Octavius's coming of age ceremony for wearing the toga virilis was in 48 BC, as opposed to Southern, who claims it occurred during 47 BC. Goldsworthy also says Octavius exchanged his toga praetexta for the toga virilis on 18 October 47 BC. However, he clarifies "Octavius was a few weeks past his sixteenth birthday", not 15 years old per Southern.

== Early career ==
=== Caesar's patronage and will ===
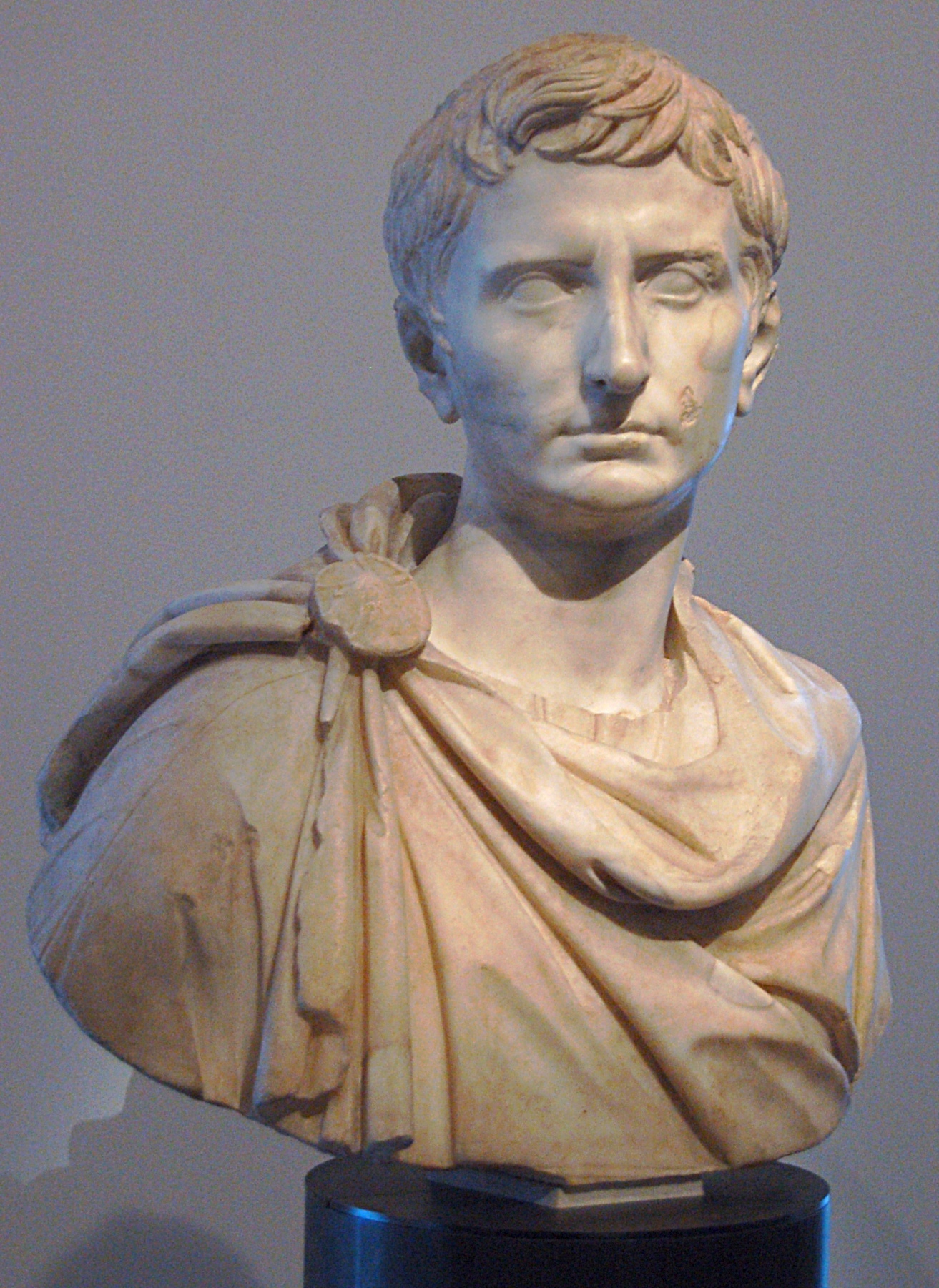
A bust of Octavian dated to around 30 BC, now located in the Capitoline Museum of Rome, Italy

In 63 BC Julius Caesar became pontifex maximus, head of the College of Pontiffs, allowing him to build political clout and eventually form the so-called 'first triumvirate' with statesmen Pompey and Marcus Licinius Crassus in 60 BC. This informal alliance, which superseded but did not suspend Rome's constitution, had fallen apart by the time Caesar crossed the Rubicon on 11 January 49 BC and initiated a protracted civil war. Southern asserts "the so-called 'first Triumvirate'" formed in 60/59 BC between Caesar, Pompey, and Crassus was not a term they would have recognized in their own day, and was only an informal alliance. Southern insists it is a "convenient modern term" made analogous to the later legally sanctioned and so-called 'second triumvirate' formed by Octavian, Antony and Lepidus. (Note: Patricia Southern explains further about the informal alliance made between Gaius Julius Caesar, Gnaeus Pompeius Magnus, and Marcus Licinius Crassus: "This earlier arrangement of 60 BC was an unofficial merger of interests, not sanctioned by law, and the participants were not styled tresviri, nor by the modern ungrammatical 'triumvirs'. They gave themselves no corporate title at all, but their association was dubbed by the people of Rome as the Three-Headed Monster".) By 46 BC Caesar was elected to serve as dictator for a ten-year term, an unprecedented length of time for the office of dictatorship that was invoked for handling limited crises and state emergencies.

At the request of Caesar, to fill a priesthood position left vacant by Lucius Domitius Ahenobarbus (after he was killed at the Battle of Pharsalus), Octavius was elected to the College of Pontiffs in Rome, being accepted in 47 BC. The following year he was put in charge of the Greek games staged in honor of the Temple of Venus Genetrix built by Julius Caesar. In late 47 BC, Octavius wished to join Caesar's staff for his campaign in Africa but gave way when his mother Atia protested over his poor health. Treating him as a son, Caesar had Octavius proceed next to his chariot during his triumph celebrating the campaign, and had him awarded with military decorations as if he had been present for it. In 46 BC, Atia consented for Octavius to join Caesar in Hispania, where he planned to fight the lingering forces of Pompey, Caesar's late enemy, but Octavius fell ill and was unable to travel. In 45 BC Octavius finally traveled to Hispania to join Caesar's camp during the fight against the forces of Gnaeus Pompeius Magnus the Younger (son of Pompey), convincing Atia not to join him there despite her worries about his fragile physical health. The cause of Octavius's perennial health problems is not clear. Goldsworthy speculates Augustus's later serious illness suffered in 23 BC may have been feigned or psychosomatic, and if real, both he and Southern have suggested a liver abscess.

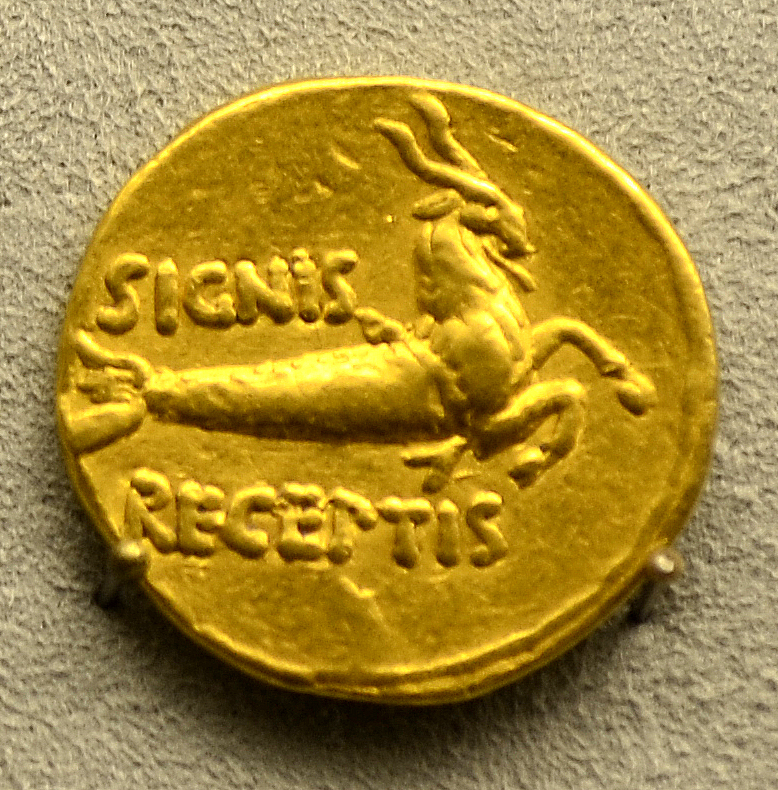
An aureus depicting Capricorn, which Augustus used as a "logo" in token of the illustrious horoscope that the astrologer Theogenes cast for him in Apollonia, Illyria

Caesar deposited a new will with the Vestal Virgins. Julius Caesar returned to Rome from Hispania in October 45 BC, but first he drafted his will while staying at his villa in Labici just outside of Rome. It was here where he named Octavius as the prime beneficiary and his principal heir on 13 September 45 BC. Goldsworthy provides a different date for Julius Caesar drafting his will, writing that it took place on 15 September 45 BC.

=== Debate over the office of magister equitum ===
It is alleged Caesar nominated Octavius to serve as Master of the Horse (Caesar's chief lieutenant) for the year 43 BC, thus making Octavius the number-two man in the state at the age of 19. However, a recently discovered inscription proves Octavius was not appointed magister equitum, in contradiction to the theory formed by Theodor Mommsen. (Note: Robert Morstein-Marx writes that "Mommsen's restoration of Fasti Capit. Cons. sub anno 44, making Octavius magister equitum designatus for 44, has now been disproved by the newly published fragments of the Privernum Fasti".) The title may stem from conflation in Greek between the magister equitum and praefectus urbi. Historian Helga Gesche disagreed with Walter Schmitthenner on the issue. Schmitthenner argued 16-year-old Octavius was too young to serve as magister equitum, and this was conflated with his role as praefectus urbi during the Feriae Latinae festivities. Gesche, with whom Ernst Badian agreed, argued Octavius's appointment to the office of magister equitum was described plainly enough in Latin by Pliny the Elder, and thus he did not seem to confuse the terminology translated into Greek. Southern argues Octavius being a relative political nobody in Rome shortly after Caesar's assassination undercuts the idea he had ever served in the prestigious office of magister equitum.

=== Training in Apollonia and assassination of Caesar ===
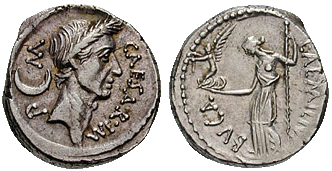
Denarius from 44 BC, showing Julius Caesar on the obverse and the goddess Venus on the reverse of the coin. Caption: CAESAR IMP. M. / L. AEMILIVS BVCA

Hoping to continue Octavius's education, at the end of 45 BC Caesar sent him along with his friends—including Marcus Vipsanius Agrippa, Quintus Salvidienus Rufus, and Gaius Maecenas—to Apollonia in Illyria (in what is now Albania), across the Adriatic Sea from Italy. At Apollonia, Octavius was tutored on academic subjects, self-control exercises, and military doctrine and tactics. Octavius's tutor Apollodorus of Pergamon accompanied him on the journey. Caesar, however, had more than just education in mind for Octavius. He had sent several legions to nearby Macedonia in preparation for an upcoming war with the Parthian Empire.

The war with the Parthians never came during Caesar's lifetime. In 44 BC, Octavius was still studying and undergoing military training at Apollonia when Caesar was made Rome's first dictator perpetuo ('dictator in perpetuity') in February. Caesar was then assassinated on the Ides of March (15 March) by senators opposed to him. It is alleged a slave owned by Octavius's mother traveled to Apollonia to inform him about the assassination.

Rejecting the advice of some army officers to take refuge with his troops in Macedonia, Octavius sailed to Italy to claim his inheritance and mantle as Caesar's rightful heir. It was then made public that Caesar had adopted Octavius as his son and main heir. In response, Octavius changed his name to Gaius Julius Caesar Octavianus and accepted his inheritance outlined in the will. (Note: Debate exists about whether Caesar could have lawfully adopted Octavius as a son. Patricia Southern explains "it was only when he arrived in Italy that Octavius learned of the adoption, which entitled him, if he so wished, to style himself Gaius Julius Caesar Octavianus. This combination of names followed the customary Roman fashion, indicating that Octavius had been adopted into the family of the Julii Caesares from his original family of the Octavii". Adrian Goldsworthy summarizes the scholarly debate about adoption as follows: "Such full adoption could only occur in the father's lifetime and could not be posthumous. This has prompted a prolonged and highly technical scholarly debate on precisely what status Julius Caesar's will gave to Octavius".) To avoid confusion, modern scholars commonly refer to him at this point as Octavian (Latin: Octavianus). However, he called himself "Caesar", which is the name his contemporaries used, though some such as Cicero and his stepfather Philippus called him Octavianus. Standing victorious after a series of armed conflicts against Sextus Pompey, his rival triumvir Mark Antony, and Cleopatra, Queen of Ptolemaic Egypt, by 30 BC Octavian became the most powerful individual in the Roman world. In 27 BC the Senate voted to grant him the title of augustus, an event which historians view as the end of the Roman Republic and start of the principate phase of the Roman Empire.

== Family tree of the Octavii Rufi ==
Legend
| Orange | Emperor | Green | Consul |

Cn. Octavius Rufus q. c. 230 BC
Cn. Octavius pr. 205 BC | C. Octavius eq.
Cn. Octavius cos. 165 BC | C. Octavius tr. mil. 216 BC
Cn. Octavius cos. 128 BC | M. Octavius tr. pl. 133 BC | C. Octavius magistr.
Cn. Octavius cos. 87 BC | M. Octavius tr. pl. | C. Octavius procos. MAC. 60 BC
L. Octavius cos. 75 BC | Cn. Octavius cos. 76 BC | C. Octavius (Augustus) imp. ROM. 27 BC–AD 14
M. Octavius aed. 50 BC

== See also ==
- Adoption in Rome
- Cultural depictions of Augustus
- Outline of Augustus
- Reign of Augustus
- Rise of Augustus

== Sources ==
=== Ancient sources ===
- Appian. Bella civilia.
  - McGing, Brian C. (2020). Appian: Roman History. Loeb Classical Library. Vol. IV–VI. Harvard University Press. ISBN 978-0-674-99647-2.
  - White, Horace (1913–14). Loeb Classical Library – via LacusCurtius.
- Augustus. Res Gestae Divi Augusti.
  - Cooley, Alison E. (2009). Res Gestae Divi Augusti: Text, Translation, and Commentary. Cambridge University Press. ISBN 978-0-521-84152-8.
  - Shipley, Frederick W. (1924). Loeb Classical Library – via LacusCurtius.
- Cicero. Epistulae ad Atticum.
  - Shackleton-Bailey, D. R. (1999). Loeb Classical Library. 4 volumes.
- Dio. Historia Romana.
  - Cary, Earnest (1914–27). Loeb Classical Library – via LacusCurtius.
- Florus. Epitomae.
- Livy. Periochae.
  - Lendering, Jona. (2003). Livius.org.
  - Schlesinger, Alfred C. (1959). Loeb Classical Library.
- Nicolaus Damascenus. Life of Augustus.
  - Toher, Mark (2017). Nicolaus of Damascus: the life of Augustus and the autobiography texts, translations and historical commentary. Cambridge University Press. ISBN 978-1-107-07561-0.
  - Hall, Clayton M. (1923). Northampton – via CSUN.edu. Archived 2007-07-14 at the Wayback Machine.
- Suetonius. Augustus.
  - Wardle, David (2014). Life of Augustus: Vita divi Augusti. Oxford University Press. ISBN 978-0-19-968645-2.
  - Rolfe, J. C. (1913–14). Loeb Classical Library – via LacusCurtius
- Tacitus. Annales.
  - Woodman, A. J. (2004). The Annals. Indianapolis: Hackett. ISBN 978-0-87220-559-8.
  - Jackson, J. (1931–37). Loeb Classical Library – via LacusCurtius
- Velleius Paterculus. Historia Romana.
  - Woodman, A. J. (2025). Velleius Paterculus. Loeb Classical Library. Harvard University Press.
  - Shipley, Frederick W. (1924). Loeb Classical Library – via LacusCurtius.

=== Modern sources ===
- Barton, Tamsyn (1995). "Augustus and Capricorn: Astrological Polyvalency and Imperial Rhetoric". The Journal of Roman Studies. 85. Society for the Promotion of Roman Studies: 33–51. doi:10.2307/301056. JSTOR 301056.
- Bringmann, Klaus (2007) [2002]. A History of the Roman Republic. Translated by Smyth, W. J. Cambridge: Polity. ISBN 978-0-7456-3371-8.
- Broughton, Thomas Robert Shannon (1952). The magistrates of the Roman republic. Vol. 2. New York: American Philological Association.
- Cavalieri, Marco; Assenmaker, Pierre; Cavagna, Mattia; Engels, David (2022). "Augustus through the Ages: Introduction". In Cavalieri, Marco; Assenmaker, Pierre; Cavagna, Mattia; Engels, David (eds.). Augustus through the Ages: Receptions, Readings and Appropriations of the Historical Figure of the First Roman Emperor. Collection Latomus. Vol. 366. Brussels: Peeters Publishers. pp. 3–32. doi:10.2307/jj.10574832.4. ISBN 978-90-429-4962-1.
- Chisholm, Kitty; Ferguson, John (1981). Rome: The Augustan Age; A Source Book. Oxford: Oxford University Press, in association with the Open University Press. ISBN 978-0-19-872108-6.
- Eck, Werner; Takács, Sarolta A. (2007) [2003]. The Age of Augustus. Translated by Schneider, Deborah Lucas (second ed.). Oxford: Blackwell Publishing. ISBN 978-1-4051-5149-8.
- Fratantuono, Lee (2016). The Battle of Actium 31 BC: War for the World. Barnsley: Pen & Sword Military. ISBN 978-1-47384-714-9.
- Galinsky, Karl (2012). Augustus: Introduction to the Life of an Emperor. New York: Cambridge University Press. ISBN 978-0-521-74442-3.
- Goldsworthy, Adrian (2014). Augustus: First Emperor of Rome. New Haven: Yale University Press. ISBN 978-0-300-17827-2.
- Lewis, Anne-Marie (2023). "Nigidius Figulus and the Birth of a Future Dominus for the World: 63 B.C.". In Lewis, Anne-Marie (ed.). Celestial Inclinations: A Life of Augustus (online ed.). New York: Oxford University Press (Oxford Academic). pp. 19–35. doi:10.1093/oso/9780197599648.003.0002. ISBN 978-0-19-759967-9.
- Luc, Ireneusz (2024). Roman Military Tribunes (First Century BC to Third Century AD): A Historical and Prosopographical Study: Prosopographical Catalogue, Part 1: Roman Military Tribunes (tribuni Militum in Exercitu) and in the Garrison of the Roman Capital (tribuni Militum in Praetorio). Vol. 1. Oxford: Archaeopress Publishing. ISBN 978-1-80327-853-7.
- Luke, Trevor (2015). "Cultivating the memory of Octavius Thurinus". Journal of Ancient History. 3 (2): 242–266. doi:10.1515/jah-2015-0012. ISSN 2324-8106. S2CID 164329002.
- Morstein-Marx, Robert (2021). Julius Caesar and the Roman People. Cambridge University Press. doi:10.1017/9781108943260. ISBN 978-1-108-83784-2. LCCN 2021024626. S2CID 242729962.
- Richardson, John Stuart (2012). Augustan Rome, 44 BC to AD 14: the Restoration of the Republic and the Establishment of the Empire. The Edinburgh History of Ancient Rome. Edinburgh University Press. ISBN 978-0-7486-1955-9.
- Rowell, Henry Thompson (1962). Rome in the Augustan Age. The Centers of Civilization Series. Vol. 5. Norman, Oklahoma: University of Oklahoma Press. ISBN 978-0-8061-0956-5.
- Shotter, David (2005) [1991]. Augustus Caesar (2nd ed.). London and New York: Routledge. ISBN 0-415-31935-8.
- Southern, Patricia (2014) [1998]. Augustus. Roman Imperial Biographies (second ed.). London and New York: Routledge. ISBN 978-0-415-62838-9.
- Zevi, Fausto; Cassola, Filippo (2016). "I Fasti di "Privernum"" [The Splendors of "Privernum"]. Zeitschrift für Papyrologie und Epigraphik (in Italian). 197: 287–309. ISSN 0084-5388. JSTOR 43910005.

Political offices
| Preceded by None | Emperor of the Roman Empire; January 15, 27 BC – August 19, 14 AD | Succeeded by Tiberius |
