= Outline of Augustus =

First Roman emperor (63 BC – AD 14)

The following outline is provided as an overview of and topical guide to Augustus:

Augustus (born Gaius Octavius; 23 September 63 BC – 19 August AD 14), also known as Octavian (Latin: Octavianus), was the founder of the Roman Empire and the first Roman emperor from 27 BC until his death in AD 14. The reign of Augustus initiated an imperial cult and an era of imperial peace (the Pax Romana or Pax Augusta) when the Roman world was largely free of armed conflict. The principate, a style of government in which the emperor showed nominal deference to the Senate, was established during his reign and lasted until the Crisis of the Third Century.

== Early life and rise to power ==
- Early life of Augustus – Detailed account of Augustus's childhood, education, and early political career
- Rise of Augustus – Detailed account of Augustus's political career as the heir to Caesar, consul, and triumvir Octavian
  - War of Mutina – The first conflict with Mark Antony that resulted in the induction of Octavian to the Senate and election as consul
  - Second Triumvirate – Political alliance between Octavian, Mark Antony, and Marcus Aemilius Lepidus
    - Mark Antony and Marcus Aemilius Lepidus, the other members of the triumvirate
  - Liberators' civil war – Conflict against Caesar's assassins
    - Battle of Philippi – Decisive battle against Caesar's assassins in 42 BC
  - Perusine War – The war against Lucius Antonius and Fulvia, the wife of Mark Antony.
    - Treaty of Brundisium – The treaty between Antony and Octavian following the Perusine War
  - Bellum Siculum – The war in Roman Sicily against Sextus Pompeius
    - Pact of Misenum – The treaty between the Second Triumvirate with Sextus Pompeius that temporarily ceased hostilities in the Mediterranean
  - Octavian's military campaigns in Illyricum – The war effort against the Dalmatae and Iapodes peoples in what is now Croatia
  - War of Actium – Final war of the Roman Republic, culminating in Octavian's victory over Mark Antony and Cleopatra

== Reign as Emperor ==
- Reign of Augustus – Summary of the life and rule of Augustus as the first Roman emperor.
- Constitutional reforms of Augustus – Comprehensive overview of the changes Augustus made to the Roman political system
- Pax Romana – Long period of relative peace in the Roman Empire, starting with Augustus
- Coinage reform of Augustus – Restructuring of the Roman monetary system, including the introduction of new coins and standardization of currency
- Forum of Augustus – Public square built by Augustus, showcasing his architectural and propaganda efforts
- Wars of Augustus – Military campaigns during Augustus's reign
  - Cantabrian Wars – Conquest of northern Spain
  - Battle of the Teutoburg Forest – Major Roman defeat in Germania in AD 9
- Augustus' Eastern policy – Diplomatic and military approach to the eastern provinces and neighboring states

== Titles ==
- Augustus (title), the title granted to Augustus by the Roman Senate in 27 BC that would become a regnal title for Roman imperial families
- Pater patriae, meaning 'father of the country', granted to Augustus by the Roman Senate in 2 BC
- Pontifex Maximus, head priest in the College of Pontiffs, assumed by Augustus after the death of former triumvir Marcus Aemilius Lepidus
- Princeps, meaning 'leading citizen' or 'first citizen', a title used by Augustus and his contemporaries to describe his political preeminence in Roman politics after his victory in the War of Actium
- Sebastos, the Greek equivalent for the title 'Augustus' used in the Greek-speaking Eastern half of the Roman Empire

== Cultural influence and contributions during his lifetime ==
- Ara Pacis – Altar dedicated to Pax, the Roman goddess of peace
- Augustan literature – Golden age of Latin literature
- Gardens of Augustus – Public gardens in Capri created by Augustus, demonstrating his interest in landscaping and public works
- Roman imperial cult – Origin of Roman emperor worship

== Family and personal life ==
=== Abodes ===
- House of Augustus – Augustus's private residence on the Palatine Hill in Rome
- Villa of Augustus – Country retreat of Augustus, likely located in the Alban Hills

=== Family members ===
- Octavia gens – The plebeian family that was raised to patrician status by Caesar, the ancestral family of Augustus

==== Grandparents ====
- Julia Minor – Augustus's maternal grandmother, and sister of Caesar
- Marcus Atius Balbus – Augustus's maternal grandfather

==== Parents ====
- Gaius Octavius – Augustus's biological father
- Julius Caesar – Augustus's adoptive father and great-uncle
- Atia – Augustus's mother

==== Siblings ====
- Octavia the Elder – Augustus's elder half-sister
- Octavia the Younger – Augustus's younger full sister

==== Wives ====
- Claudia – Augustus's first wife
- Scribonia – Augustus's second wife
- Livia – Augustus's third wife and influential figure in the early Roman Empire

==== Children ====
- Julia the Elder – Augustus's only biological child, daughter with Scribonia
- Gaius Caesar – Augustus's adopted son and grandson
- Lucius Caesar – Augustus's adopted son and grandson
- Agrippa Postumus – Augustus's adopted son and grandson
- Tiberius – Augustus's adopted son and stepson, successor as emperor
- Nero Drusus – Augustus's stepson
- Cornelia – Augustus's stepdaughter

==== Other notable family members ====
- Marcus Vipsanius Agrippa – Close friend, general, and son-in-law of Augustus
- Marcellus (nephew of Augustus) – Son of Augustus's sister Octavia, groomed as a potential heir but died of illness at the age of 19.

== Legacy ==
- Julio-Claudian dynasty – The imperial dynasty founded by Augustus
- Aqua Alsietina – aqueduct built in Rome to provide water to an artificial lake along the Tiber where mock naval battles (naumachia) entertained crowds
- Augustus of Prima Porta – Famous statue of Augustus
- Roman imperial cult – Worship of emperors, including Augustus, as divine or semi-divine figures
  - Sodales Augustales – Priesthood dedicated to the cult of Augustus
- Mausoleum of Augustus – Monumental tomb built by Augustus for himself and his family
- Naumachia of Augustus – an artificial lake built along the Tiber in Rome where mock naval battles were staged and fed by the Aqua Alsietina aqueduct
- Principate – the style of imperial government established by Augustus (the princeps or 'leading citizen'), which was eventually replaced by the Dominate form of government established by emperor Diocletian in the late 3rd century AD
- Res Gestae Divi Augusti – Augustus's autobiographical funerary inscription detailing his achievements and honors
- Temples of Augustus
  - Temple of Divus Augustus (Rome) – Temple dedicated to the deified Augustus in Rome
  - Temple of Augustus and Rome (Athens) – Temple in Athens dedicated to Augustus and the goddess Roma
  - Temple of Divus Augustus (Nola) – Temple in Nola, Italy, dedicated to the deified Augustus
  - Temple of Augustus (Barcelona) – Roman temple in Barcelona dedicated to Augustus
- Roman Temple of Évora – Well-preserved Roman temple in Évora, Portugal, possibly dedicated to the imperial cult
- Felicior Augusto, melior Traiano – Latin phrase meaning "May you be luckier than Augustus and better than Trajan," used to praise subsequent emperors
- Cultural depictions of Augustus – Representations of Augustus in art, literature, and popular culture throughout history

== See also ==
- Dominate
- Julius Caesar
- List of Roman emperors
- Pax Romana
- Roman Empire
- Roman Republic
