= Gaius Octavius (tribune 216 BC) =

Roman army officer

- Citizenship: Ancient Rome
- Occupation: Military tribune
- Years active: 216 BC
- Era: Republic
- Children: Gaius Octavius
- Father: Gaius Octavius
- Relatives: Gnaeus Octavius Rufus (paternal grandfather); Gnaeus Octavius (paternal uncle); Gnaeus Octavius (first cousin)

Gaius Octavius (fl. 205 BC) was a Roman army officer who was active during the third century BC. He was the son of the equestrian Gaius Octavius and grandson of the quaestor Gnaeus Octavius Rufus, also the father of Velitrae's magistrate Gaius Octavius, grandfather of praetor Gaius Octavius and great-grandfather of Roman emperor Augustus (reigning 27 BC - 14 AD). When Marcus Antonius tried to show his contempt against Augustus, he said that Octavius was a freedman and rope-maker from Thurii.

During the Second Punic War, Octavius served as military tribune and participated in the disastrous battle of Cannae, being one of few survivors. When the Carthaginians marched into the Roman camp, Octavius and his colleague, tribune P. Sempronius Tuditanus, managed to cut their way through the enemy and arrived safely in Canusium. He served in Sicilia (modern Sicily) under the praetor Lucius Aemilius Papus in 205 BC, but it is unknown whether he took part in some other expedition.

Legend
Orange	Emperor	Green	Consul

Cn. Octavius Rufus q. c. 230 BC
Cn. Octavius pr. 205 BC	C. Octavius eq.
Cn. Octavius cos. 165 BC	C. Octavius tr. mil. 216 BC
Cn. Octavius cos. 128 BC	M. Octavius tr. pl. 133 BC	C. Octavius magistr.
Cn. Octavius cos. 87 BC	M. Octavius tr. pl.	C. Octavius procos. MAC. 60 BC
L. Octavius cos. 75 BC	Cn. Octavius cos. 76 BC	C. Octavius (Augustus) imp. ROM. 27 BC–AD 14
M. Octavius aed. 50 BC

== See also ==
- Octavia (gens)

== Bibliography ==
- Smith, William (1870). Dictionary of Greek and Roman Biography and Mythology. Vol. III. Archived from the original on 2015-04-05.
- Suetonius (121). The Life of Augustus.
