= Wars of Augustus =

Military campaigns undertaken by the Romans during the rule of emperor Augustus

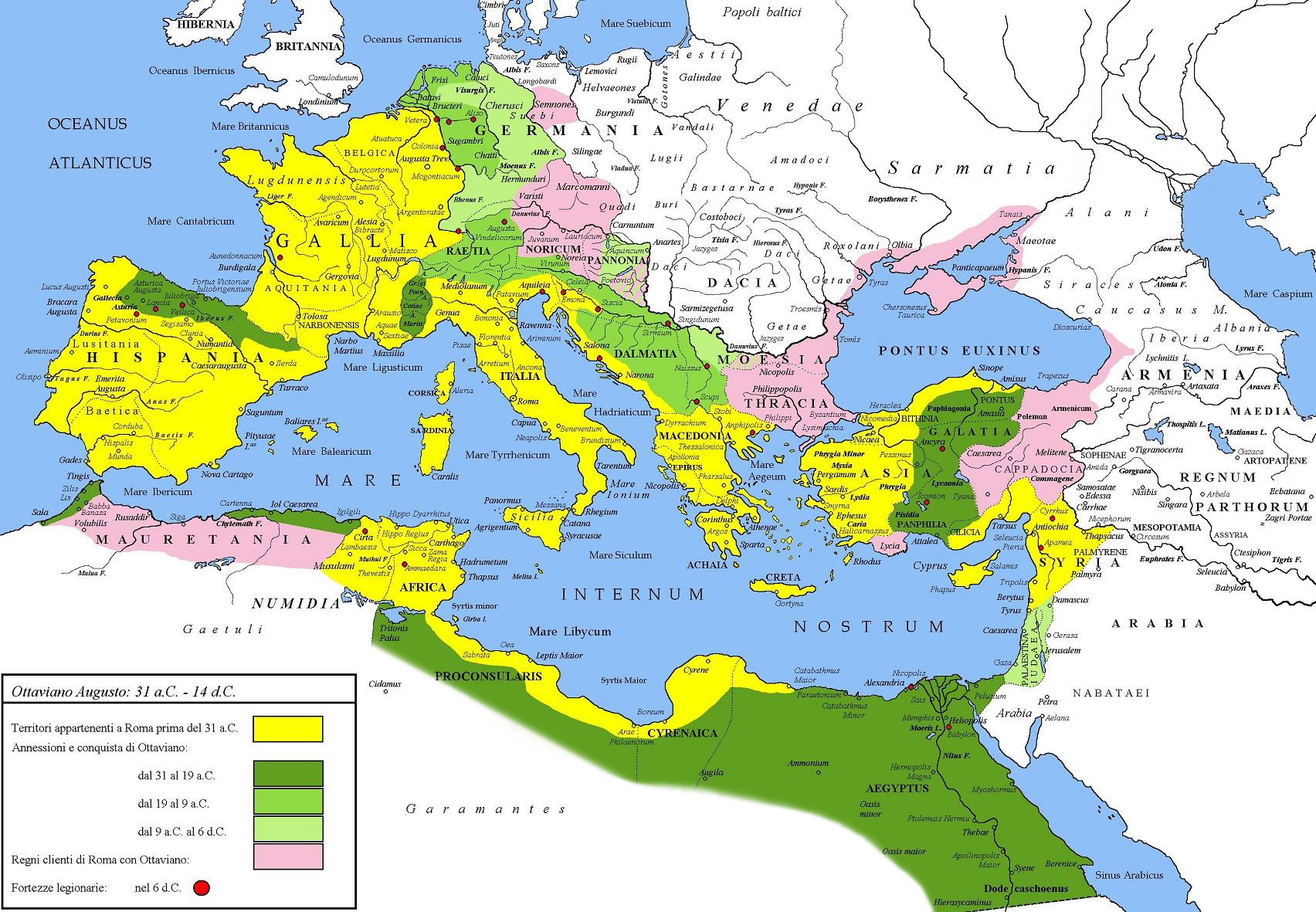
Extent of the Roman Empire under Augustus; the yellow legend represents the extent of the Empire in 31 BC, the shades of green represent gradually conquered territories under the reign of Augustus, and pink areas on the map represent client states.

The wars of Augustus are the military campaigns undertaken by the Roman government during the sole rule of the first Roman emperor Augustus (r. 27 BC – AD 14), previously referred to as Octavian. This period stretching across four decades witnessed major campaigns almost every year, many of them commanded by Augustus's son-in-law Marcus Vipsanius Agrippa and stepson and eventual successor Tiberius. This period also saw expansion through diplomacy and annexation, without the direct use of military force. The result was a major expansion of the Roman Empire around provincial territories Augustus had inherited from the Roman Republic in and around the Mediterranean basin.

In West Asia, territories in Anatolia and the Levant were annexed by Rome during the reign of Augustus, while peace was made with the rival Parthian Empire. In Europe, territories in the Balkans, the Alpine region, and the Iberian peninsula were conquered. In North Africa, Roman Egypt served as a launching pad for a failed invasion of Saba in South Arabia, and a punitive invasion into the Kingdom of Kush (centered in what is now Sudan) after a Kushite invasion of Egypt. Further west in the Maghreb, the Romans successfully defended their client state of Mauretania against rebel forces.

The attempted conquest of Germania starting in 12 BC ended in defeat at Teutoburg in AD 9 and eventual abandonment of territories east of the Rhine. The Romans withdrew to the Rhineland despite the enormous deployment of resources involved and success of Germanicus's expedition into Germania in AD 14–16. The Roman Empire made few expansions into continental Europe after these campaigns. However, it conquered Dacia in Southeast Europe during the 2nd century, and also much of the British Isles during the 1st century.

== Overview ==
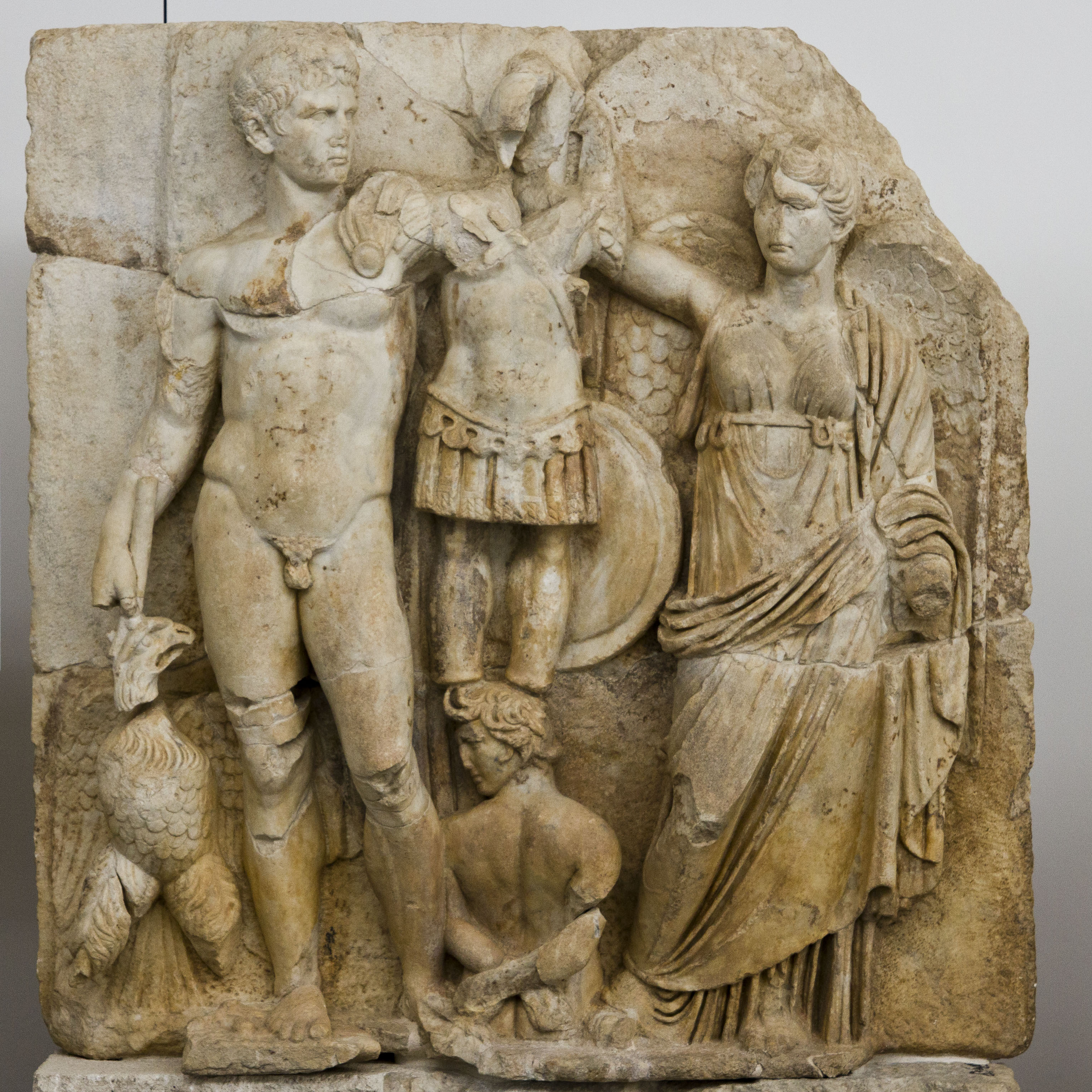
A Roman marble carved relief depicting a deified Augustus standing next to a tropaion ('trophy') crowned by goddess Victory, with an Eagle of Zeus perhaps symbolizing his consecration, dated to the reign of Tiberius (AD 14–37), from the Sebasteion of Aphrodisias, now in the Aphrodisias Museum (Turkey)

In 29 BC, the Roman Senate ordered the closure of the doors to the Temple of Janus in the Roman Forum for the first time in over 200 years. Signifying that the Roman state was no longer at war, this act reportedly pleased Octavian, then in his fifth consulship, more than all the other honours showered on him. This allowed him to continue perpetuating the image of himself as the bringer of peace he had earned after ending the last Republican era civil war in 30 BC against Mark Antony and Cleopatra. However, as Dio himself points out, there were ongoing major operations against the Treveri in Gaul, and the Cantabrari and Astures in Spain. Furthermore, the closure inaugurated nearly half a century of virtually incessant warfare, during which Augustus dramatically enlarged the Roman Empire, annexing Egypt, Dalmatia, Pannonia, Noricum, and Raetia, expanding possessions in Africa, and completing the conquest of Hispania, but suffered a major setback in Germania. The Rhineland frontiers of the Empire established by Augustus would remain relatively static for centuries and further instill the idea of being "world-conquerors" in the Roman people from their Mediterranean-centered perspective.

Julius Caesar had invaded Britain in 55 and 54 BC and exacted tribute, while there were two occasions when defeated Briton chieftains who fled the British Isles came to the court of Augustus seeking military aid. It is unclear how these royal disputes were settled, but Augustus refrained from invading Britain despite building a transport fleet in Gallia Aquitania. The initial Roman conquest of Britain in AD 43 was instead overseen by emperor Claudius, who established the Roman province of Britain.

== Chronology ==
=== 30 BC ===
==== Gaul ====
The Morini and Treveri tribes of Gallia Comata province (Pas-de-Calais region of NE France), rebel against Roman rule and the Suebi Germans cross the Rhine to give them support. But the Morini are defeated by the proconsul (governor) of Gaul, Gaius Carrinas, who goes on to drive out the Suebi, for which he is awarded a joint Triumph with Augustus in 29 BC.

==== Egypt ====
The prefectures Aegypti (governor of Egypt) Gaius Cornelius Gallus quells two local revolts in Heroonpolis in the Nile delta and in the Thebaid. Subsequently, he leads a Roman army South of the First Cataract of the Nile for the first time. He establishes a puppet-state called Triacontaschoenos under a local petty king to act as a buffer-zone between Egypt and Aethiopia (i.e. the kingdom of Aksum), as well as a loose protectorate over Ethiopia itself. Despite his success, Gallus incurs Augustus' displeasure by erecting monuments to himself and is recalled to Rome, tried by the Senate and convicted of various unspecified charges and banished.

=== 29 BC ===
==== Gaul ====
The Treveri revolt is quelled by the new proconsul of Gaul, C. Nonius Gallus, who is rewarded with the title of imperator ("supreme commander").

==== Lower Danube ====
The proconsul of Macedonia, M. Licinius Crassus, grandson of Crassus the triumvir, launches the conquest of Moesia. He chases an army of Bastarnae, which was raiding a Roman allied tribe, back over the Haemus (Balkan) mountains but fails to bring them to battle. He then marches against a major fortress held by the Moesi people. Although his vanguard is routed by a Moesi sortie, Crassus succeeds in taking the stronghold. After that, he intercepts and routs the Bastarnae host near the Ciabrus river (Tsibritsa, Bulgaria), personally killing its leader in combat. Those Bastarnae who escape across the Danube river, and entrench themselves in a natural strongpoint, he dislodges with the assistance of the local king of the Getae. Crassus then turns his attention to the Moesi again. After a long and arduous campaign, he forces the submission of the great majority of Moesi.

=== 26 BC ===
==== Spain ====
Augustus takes personal command of the campaign against the Cantabri.

==== Egypt and South Arabia ====
Responding to a directive from Augustus, the prefectures Aegypti, Aelius Gallus (no relation to his predecessor, Cornelius Gallus) leads an expedition across the Red Sea against the Sabaeans of Arabia Felix in South Arabia (modern Yemen). The key attraction was that this region produced aromatic substances such as frankincense and myrrh, which were greatly prized in Rome. In addition, occupation of the Kingdom of Saba would give the Romans control of both sides of the entrance to the Red Sea, the Bab-el-Mandeb strait, since Cornelius Gallus had established a garrison at Arsinoe (near Assab, Eritrea) on the Ethiopian shore. The expedition consists of 10,000 troops including allies, and 130 freight-ships. Gallus was counting on the assistance of the Nabataean Arabs of northwest Arabia, whose king Obodas was a Roman ally and contributed 1,000 warriors under his chief secretary, Syllabus. The latter allegedly sabotaged the mission throughout with poor advice, but Glen Bowersock insists that this blame placed on Obodas by Strabo is most likely an exaggeration, since he remained in favor under Augustus. The force sails by ship from Clysma (Suez, Egypt) to Luke Come but suffers heavy losses to storms in transit, so that on arrival, Gallus is forced to spend the rest of the year at Lake Come to give his men a chance to recuperate and to effect repairs to his fleet. Roman forces lay siege to Marib, but a shortage of water forces them to retreat to Hejaz, then under allied Nabataean control.

=== 25 BC ===
==== Spain ====
Augustus, although in nominal command of the campaign against the Astures and Callaeci, is incapacitated by illness. The campaign is brought to a successful conclusion, with the last rebels crushed, by the governors of Hispania Citerior and Ulterior, respectively Gaius Antistius Vetus and Publius Carisius.

==== Alps ====
Augustus despatches an army under Aulus Terentius Varro Murena against the Salassi tribe of the Val d'Aosta region of the northwestern Alps. The latter controlled the Great St Bernard pass, the shortest route between Italy and the Upper Rhine region. The Salassi are utterly defeated and, according to Strabo, Murena deports and sells into slavery 44,000 tribespeople.

==== Asia Minor ====
King Amyntas dies, but Augustus prevents any of his sons from inheriting the kingdom, instead placing Roman governors in charge of Galatia and Lycaonia

=== 24 BC ===
==== Egypt and Sudan ====
Gaius Petronius replaces Aelius Gallus as prefect of Egypt and is ordered by Augustus to invade Aethiopia, after Queen Amanirenas of the Kingdom of Kush (in modern Sudan) invaded Roman Egypt and sacked Aswan and Philae. The Romans counterattack, sacking Napata in Nubia before withdrawing. Amanirenas invades Roman Egypt again in 22 BC, threatening, Primis (modern Qasr Ibrim). Petronius bolsters its defenses and withstands a Kushite assault. Afterwards, Amanirenas negotiates a favorable peace treaty with Rome, establishing Maharraqa as the new border with Kush (previously set at Aswan) and guaranteeing peaceful trade relations with the Roman Empire.

=== 20 BC ===
==== Asia ====
Augustus reaches a settlement that establishes individual rulers of Cilicia, Emesa, Lesser Armenia, and Commagene, bringing them under Roman influence. Additionally, Tiberius invades Armenia and reinstates King Tigranes V of Armenia.

==== Parthia ====
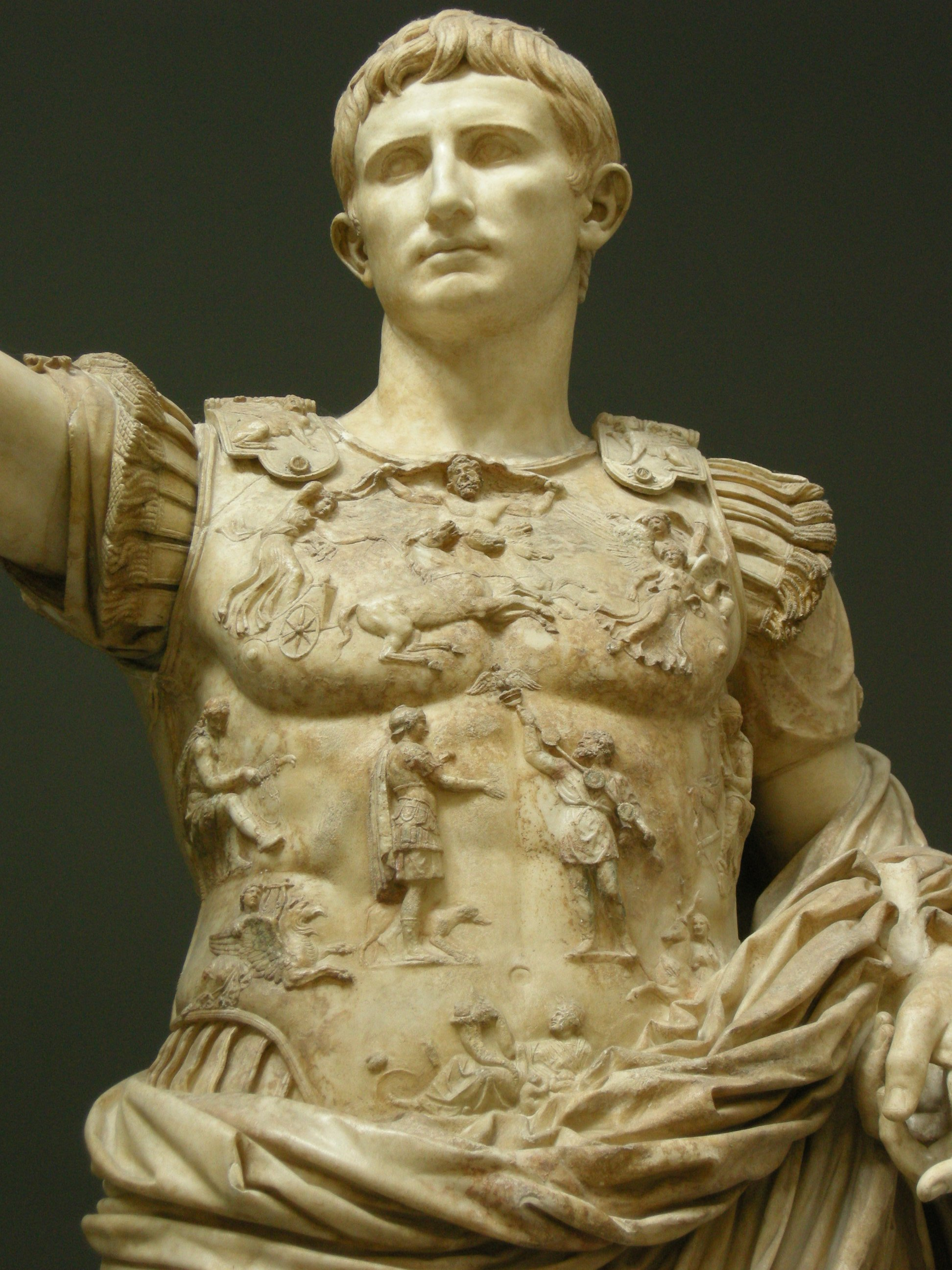
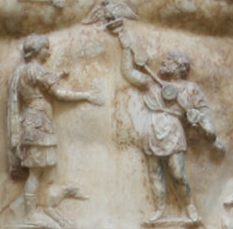
A close-up view of the breastplate on the statue of Augustus of Prima Porta, showing a Parthian man returning to Augustus the legionary standards lost by Marcus Licinius Crassus at Carrhae

Roman prisoners of war and captured standards are returned, and the acceptance of a more peaceful co-existence between the Romans and Parthians is established in West Asia. This is praised as a "bloodless" victory and further cemented the idea in the empire of universal Roman rule being accepted.

=== 15 BC ===
==== Alps ====
Tiberius and Drusus begin to campaign throughout regions in the Alpine territories; securing land, strengthening positions, in preparation for the invasion of Germania.

=== 6 AD ===
==== Maghreb ====
In the Maghreb (modern Morocco and Algeria), Cossus Cornelius Lentulus Gaetulicus puts down a rebellion of the Gaetuli against Rome's Mauretanian client ruler Juba II.

==== Balkans and Adriatic Sea ====
Illyrian tribes stage a revolt against Rome in the province of Illyricum (soon after split to form the separate province of Pannonia). By 9 AD their rebellion is crushed by Roman forces under Tiberius and Germanicus.

=== Roman Campaigns in Germania (c.12 BC – AD 16) ===
The Roman campaigns in Germania were a series of conflicts between the Germanic tribes and the Roman Empire. Tensions between the Germanic tribes and the Romans began as early as 17 BC with Clades Lolliana, where the 5th Legion under Marcus Lollius was defeated by the tribes Sicambri, Usipetes, and Tencteri. Augustus responded by rapidly developing military infrastructure across Gaul. His general, Nero Claudius Drusus, began building forts along the Rhine in 13 BC and launched a retaliatory campaign across the Rhine in 12 BC.

Drusus led three more campaigns against the Germanic tribes in the years 11–9 BC. For the campaign of 10 BC, he was celebrated as being the Roman who traveled farthest east into Northern Europe. Succeeding generals would continue attacking across the Rhine until AD 16, notably Publius Quinctilius Varus in AD 9, who suffered a major humiliation at Teutoburg Forest. During the return trip from his campaign, Varus was betrayed by Arminius, who was an ally of Rome and leader of the Cherusci. Roman expansion into Germania Magna stopped as a result, and all campaigns immediately after were in retaliation of the Clades Variana and to prove that Roman military might could still overcome German lands. The last general to lead Roman forces in the region during this time was Germanicus, the adoptive son of Augustus' successor, Tiberius, who in AD 16 launched the final major military expedition by Rome into Germania. The Roman Empire would launch no other major incursion into Germany until Marcus Aurelius (r. 161–180) during the Marcomannic Wars.

== See also ==
- Early life of Augustus
- Outline of Augustus
- Reign of Augustus
- Rise of Augustus
