= Gnaeus Octavius (consul 76 BC) =

Ancient Roman politician, forefather of Emperor August

Gnaeus Octavius was consul of the Roman Republic in 76 BC. His father Marcus Octavius was possibly either the Marcus who was the tribunus plebis in 133 BC, political opponent of Tiberius Gracchus, or the Marcus who was also tribunus plebis and brought forward a law raising the price at which corn was sold to the people.

A member of the plebeian gens Octavia, Gnaeus Octavius was elected praetor by 79 BC at the latest. He may have been the praetor urbanus who introduced the Formula Octaviana, a law which provided for the restoration of property and money which had been obtained by violent acts, or by threats of violence. Gnaeus Octavius was elected consul for 76 BC, with Gaius Scribonius Curio as his colleague.

Scorned as an orator, he was also plagued with attacks of gout, which eventually made it impossible for him to walk.

Legend
Orange	Emperor	Green	Consul

Cn. Octavius Rufus q. c. 230 BC
Cn. Octavius pr. 205 BC	C. Octavius eq.
Cn. Octavius cos. 165 BC	C. Octavius tr. mil. 216 BC
Cn. Octavius cos. 128 BC	M. Octavius tr. pl. 133 BC	C. Octavius magistr.
Cn. Octavius cos. 87 BC	M. Octavius tr. pl.	C. Octavius procos. MAC. 60 BC
L. Octavius cos. 75 BC	Cn. Octavius cos. 76 BC	C. Octavius (Augustus) imp. ROM. 27 BC–AD 14
M. Octavius aed. 50 BC

== See also ==
- Octavia (gens)

== Sources ==
- Brennan, T. Corey, The Praetorship in the Roman Republic, Volume 2 (2000)
- Broughton, T. Robert S., The Magistrates of the Roman Republic, Vol. II (1951)
- Smith, William, Dictionary of Greek and Roman Biography and Mythology, Vol III (1867).

Political offices
Preceded by Decimus Junius Brutus and Mamercus Aemilius Lepidus Livianus	Consul of the Roman Republic; 76 BC with Gaius Scribonius Curio	Succeeded by Lucius Octavius and Gaius Aurelius Cotta
