= Agepolis =

2nd-century BC Greek official

Agepolis (Ancient Greek: Ἀγέπολις) of Rhodes was sent by his countrymen as ambassador to the consul Quintus Marcius Philippus in 169 BC, in the war with Perseus of Macedon, and had an interview with him near Herakleion in Macedon, in which Agepolis was notably charmed by the consul. The purpose of Agesipolis was to placate the Romans, refuting the accusations and slanders that had been made in the Roman Senate against the Rhodians, and declaring the Rhodians' loyalty to Rome. He shortly thereafter visited Gaius Marcus Figulus and was received even more favorably. The Rhodians considered the warm receptions received by their envoy to be indicative of Rome's anxiety over the war, a conviction that was confirmed in their eyes when Agepolis related how Philippus had taken him aside to ask privately why Rhodes did not intercede to help end the conflict.

In 168, Agepolis went as ambassador to Rome to communicate to the Senate how Rome's war against Perseus was a great burden for Greece, and ultimately unprofitable for Rome itself. The war, however, had already concluded with Rome's victory, and the Senate accused Agepolis of serving neither Greece nor Rome's interests, but those of the now-defeated Perseus.
