= Gaius Octavius (father of Augustus) =

Roman general and senator

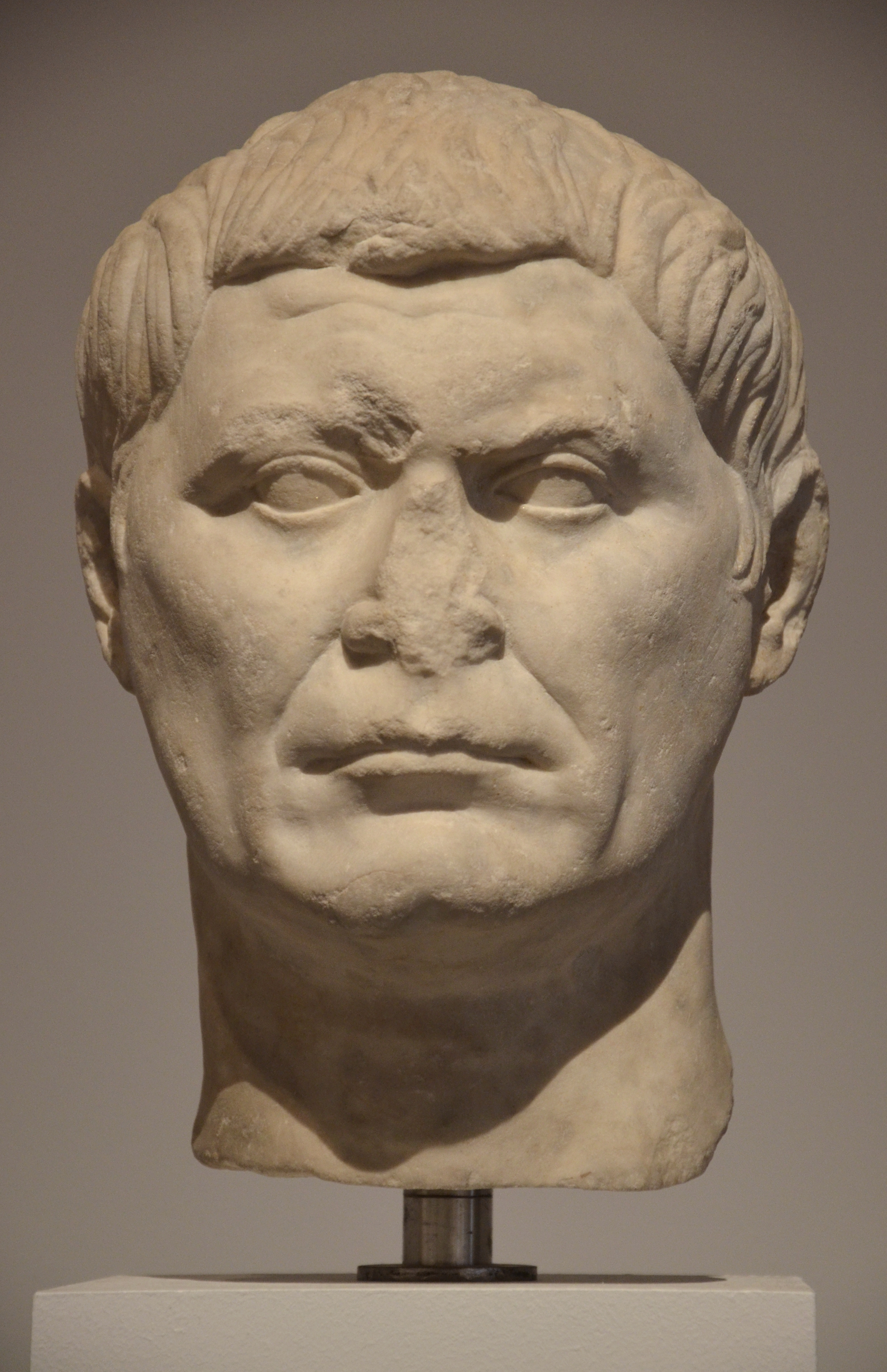
- Head of statue, thought to be Gaius Octavius
- Born: c. 100 BC; Velitrae, Italy, Roman Republic
- Died: 59 BC; Nola, Italy, Roman Republic
- Occupation: Politician
- Spouse(s): Ancharia; Atia
- Children: Octavia the Elder; Octavia the Younger; Octavian (Augustus)

Gaius Octavius (c. 100 – 59 BC) was a Roman politician. He was an ancestor to the Roman emperors of the Julio-Claudian dynasty. He was the biological father of the Emperor Augustus, step-grandfather of the Emperor Tiberius, great-grandfather of the Emperor Claudius, and great-great-grandfather of the Emperors Caligula and Nero. Hailing from Velitrae, he belonged to an old and wealthy equestrian branch of the plebeian gens Octavia. Not being of senatorial rank, he was a novus homo ("new man") at Rome. His grandfather, Gaius Octavius, fought as a military tribune in Sicily during the Second Punic War. His father, Gaius Octavius, was a municipal magistrate who lived to an advanced age.

== Personal life ==
Octavius' first wife was named Ancharia. The two had a child named Octavia the Elder. It is not known how the marriage ended, although it is possible that Ancharia died during child birth. Octavius later married the niece of Julius Caesar, Atia. How they met is not known, although Atia's family on her father's side (the Atii Balbi) lived close to Velitrae, which was the ancestral home of the Octavii. They had two children: Octavia the Younger (b. 69 BC) and Gaius Octavius (b. 63 BC), who became Roman Emperor, Augustus.

== Political career ==
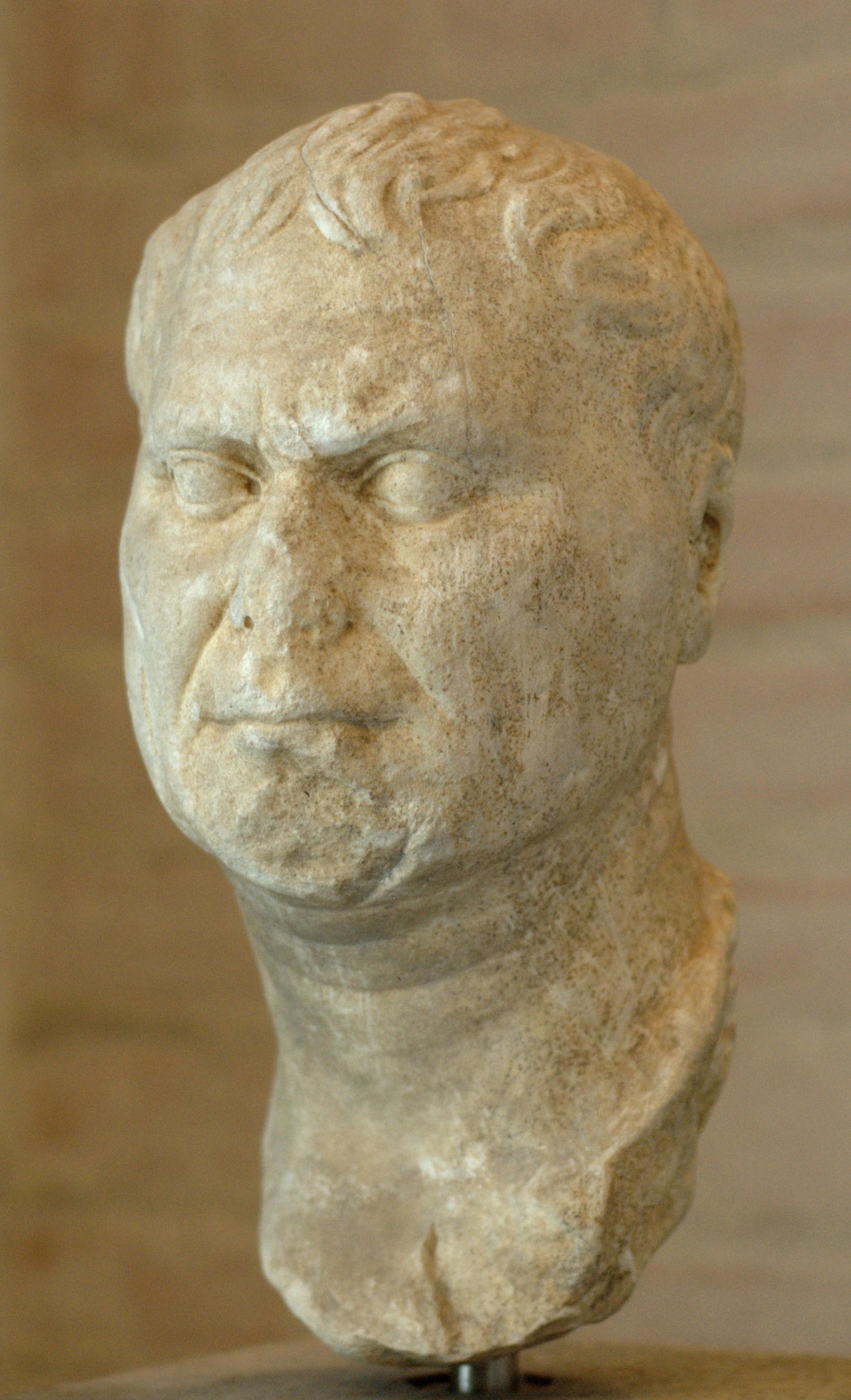
Head of statue, thought to be Gaius Octavius, father of Octavian, c. 60 BC, Munich Glyptothek

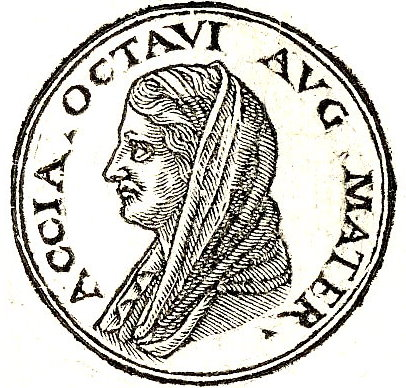
Atia from Promptuarii Iconum Insigniorum

Some time before 73 BC, he had served as military tribune. He may have been elected quaestor some time around 73 BC and later plebeian aedile around 64 BC. His first clearly noted office was that of praetor in 61 BC.

In 60 BC, after his term as praetor had ended, he was appointed proconsul of Macedonia. However, before he left for Macedonia, the senate sent him to put down a slave rebellion in Thurii. These slaves had previously taken part in the rebellions led by Spartacus and Catiline. Octavius' victory over the slaves in Thurii led him to give his son, then a few years old, the cognomen of "Thurinus". He then left for Macedonia and proved to be a capable administrator, governing with "equal justice and courage". He was saluted imperator for his victories over the Bessi in Thrace in 59 BC.

Cicero had high regard for Octavius' diplomatic dealings. According to Cicero, due to Octavius' successful term as in Macedonia, he was likely to have won the support necessary to stand for election as consul. Some time in 59 BC, Octavius sailed to Rome to stand for election as consul. However, he never arrived, having died in Nola. His career is summarized in an inscription erected by his son on the forum he built in Rome:

C(aius) Octavius C(ai) f(ilius) C(ai) n(epos) C(ai) pr[on(epos)]
pater Augusti
tr(ibunus) mil(itum) bis q(uaestor) aed(ilis) pl(ebis) cum
C(aio) Toranio iudex quaestionum
pr(aetor) proco(n)s(ul) imperator appellatus
ex provincia Macedonia

“Gaius Octavius, son, grandson and great-grandson of Gaius,
father of Augustus,
twice military tribune, quaestor, aedile of the plebs together with
Gaius Toranius, judge,
praetor, proconsul, proclaimed imperator
in the province of Macedonia”

== Family tree of the Octavii Rufi ==
Legend
Orange	Emperor	Green	Consul

Cn. Octavius Rufus q. c. 230 BC
Cn. Octavius pr. 205 BC	C. Octavius eq.
Cn. Octavius cos. 165 BC	C. Octavius tr. mil. 216 BC
Cn. Octavius cos. 128 BC	M. Octavius tr. pl. 133 BC	C. Octavius magistr.
Cn. Octavius cos. 87 BC	M. Octavius tr. pl.	C. Octavius procos. MAC. 60 BC
L. Octavius cos. 75 BC	Cn. Octavius cos. 76 BC	C. Octavius (Augustus) imp. ROM. 27 BC–AD 14
M. Octavius aed. 50 BC

Since the last Gaius Octavius (Augustus) was adopted by his great-uncle Julius Caesar and became one of the Julii Caesares, the family's original nomen gentile was not inherited by his only daughter (i.e. Julia the Elder) and adopted sons (i.e. Gaius Caesar, Lucius Caesar, Tiberius, Agrippa Postumus), which meant the end of the Octavii Rufi's male line.

== See also ==
- Octavia gens
- Julio-Claudian family tree

== Sources ==
- Broughton, Thomas Robert Shannon (1952). The magistrates of the Roman republic. Vol. 2. New York: American Philological Association.
- Everitt, Antony (2006). Augustus: the life of Rome's first emperor. Random House. ISBN 978-0-8129-7058-6.
- Suetonius (1913) [1st century AD]. "Life of Augustus". The Twelve Caesars. Translated by Rolfe, JC – via LacusCurtius.
