= Gaius Aurelius Cotta =

Roman statesman and orator (124–73 BCE)

Gaius Aurelius Cotta (124 – 74 BC) was a Roman statesman, orator, priest, and Academic Skeptic; he is not to be confused with Gaius Aurelius Cotta who was consul twice in the 3rd century BCE.

== Life ==
Born in 124 BC as the son of Marcus Aurelius Cotta and Rutilia. He was a cousin of Julius Caesar's mother, Aurelia. His younger brothers were Marcus Aurelius Cotta and Lucius Aurelius Cotta.

In 92 BC he defended his uncle Publius Rutilius Rufus, who had been unjustly accused of extortion in Asia. He was on intimate terms with the tribune Marcus Livius Drusus, who was murdered in 91 BC, and in the same year was an unsuccessful candidate for the tribunate. Shortly afterwards he was prosecuted under the lex Varia, the law proposed by Quintus Varius Severus which was directed against all who had in any way supported the Italians against Rome, and, in order to avoid condemnation, went into voluntary exile.

He did not return until 82 BC, during the dictatorship of Lucius Cornelius Sulla. Perhaps he fought in 80 BC as propraetor unsuccessfully against Quintus Sertorius. In 75 he was consul, and excited the hostility of the optimates by carrying a law that abolished the Sullan disqualification of the tribunes of the plebs from holding higher magistracies; another law de judiciis privatis, of which nothing is known, was abrogated by his brother Lucius Cotta. Cotta obtained the province of Gaul, and was granted a triumph for some victory of which we possess no details; but on the very day before its celebration an old wound broke out, and he died suddenly.

According to Cicero, Publius Sulpicius Rufus and Cotta were the best speakers of the young men of their time. Physically incapable of rising to passionate heights of oratory, Cotta's successes were chiefly due to his searching investigation of facts; he kept strictly to the essentials of the case and avoided all irrelevant digressions. His style was pure and simple. He is introduced by Cicero as an interlocutor in the De Oratore and De Natura Deorum (iii.), as a supporter of the principles of the New Academy. The fragments of Sallust contain the substance of a speech delivered by Cotta in order to calm the popular anger at a deficient corn supply.

== See also ==
- Aurelia gens

== Notes ==
Preceded by Gn. Octavius; G. Scribonius Curio	Consul of Rome; 75 BC; With: Lucius Octavius	Succeeded by L. Licinius Lucullus; M. Aurelius Cotta
