= Gnaeus Octavius (consul 87 BC) =

Roman politician

Gnaeus Octavius (died 87 BC) was a Roman senator who was elected consul of the Roman Republic in 87 BC alongside Lucius Cornelius Cinna. He died during the Bellum Octavianum, a civil war that ended with the capture of Rome by Cinna and Gaius Marius.

== Early career ==
Gnaeus Octavius was a member of the Plebeian gens Octavia. His father, also called Gnaeus Octavius, was Consul in 128 BC, while his uncle, Marcus Octavius, was a key figure in opposition to the reforms of Tiberius Gracchus in 133 BC. He was a third cousin to Gaius Octavius, father of the future emperor Augustus.

Although he had failed to be elected aedile, in around 90 BC, Octavius was elected Praetor, and in the following year (89 BC) was given a propraetorial command in one of the eastern provinces. In 88 BC he was back in Rome where he was elected to be consul for the upcoming year (87 BC). While consul designate, he was made to swear an oath alongside his colleague, the popularist senator Lucius Cornelius Cinna, that he would uphold the changes instituted by the current consul, Sulla, and not strip Sulla of his lawful command of the First Mithridatic War. Octavius kept his oath, probably because of his religious beliefs.

Octavius disliked both Sulla's march on Rome and Sulla's personal vendetta against Gaius Marius which resulted in Marius's exile. However, he was a conservative member of the Senate, and was distrustful of Cinna's popularist programme. These political differences saw the two consuls almost immediately begin quarrelling in 87 BC over policy, in which Cinna wanted to enrol the new citizens (Italian allies) across all of the Roman tribes. He also proposed the recall of Marius and all his supporters. These proposals were opposed by Octavius, who spoke against them in the Senate.

Because of his interest in soothsayers, modern scholars have supposed that Octavius was a member of the decemviri sacris faciundis, the priests in charge of the Sibylline books.

== Conflict with Cinna ==
Things came to a head when the Plebeian tribunes who supported Octavius vetoed the law in the Tribal Assembly. Cinna and his supporters began using violence to intimidate the tribunes to withdraw their veto, leading to a full-scale riot in the Roman Forum. Octavius quickly gathered an armed group of supporters and attacked Cinna, who was forced to flee the city. During the fight, Octavius's men openly murdered a large number of newly enfranchised citizens, with Octavius using his authority as consul to justify the murders.

Octavius then illegally stripped Cinna of his consulship and his citizenship, and had elected in his stead Lucius Cornelius Merula. Hearing that Cinna had gained the support of the army of Appius Claudius at Nola, Octavius and the Senate began preparing Rome to withstand a siege, whilst sending out appeals to the various promagistrates to come to the assistance of the Senate. Pompeius Strabo was initially unwilling to cooperate with Octavius, but eventually moved his troops to the vicinity of Rome, just outside the Colline Gate.

When Cinna and Marius began their siege of Rome. Strabo, who was playing a double game with both Octavius and Cinna, attempted to convince Octavius to enter into negotiations with Cinna. An attack by the Marian forces took the Janiculum, but they were repulsed by Octavius and Strabo, with Octavius suffering serious losses. These losses and the sudden death of Strabo soon after saw Octavius's army become increasingly demoralized. He lost 6,000 troops in the battle, while Strabo had lost some 11,000, both through the fighting and a plague that was running through his army. Due to the fear of famine in Rome, Octavius joined his men to Strabo's units, positioned outside the gates, after which he fled from Rome.

Meeting up with Quintus Caecilius Metellus Pius and Publius Licinius Crassus (who had eventually obeyed Octavius's plea to return to Rome) at the Alban Hills, he was frustrated when they began to negotiate with Cinna, even going so far as recognizing Cinna as consul. Fearful of this turn of events, and of news that the Senate was also contemplating coming to terms with Cinna, he fell out with Metellus Pius, who had initially refused his soldiers' demands that he take command from Octavius. The army's apparent disloyalty finally convinced Octavius to return to Rome.

== Death and reputation ==
Although he tried to continue the resistance against Cinna, Octavius was unable to prevent the Senate from coming to terms with Cinna who entered Rome as consul. Although Cinna gave a vague promise that no harm would come to Octavius, Octavius was persuaded by a group of colleagues to abandon the forum and set himself up on the Janiculum as consul in protest against the recognition of Cinna, accompanied by a small number of nobles and a tiny remnant of his military forces. He refused to escape when Gaius Marcius Censorinus and a small cavalry force stormed the Janiculum, capturing him. Octavius was then beheaded by Censorinus who took his head to Cinna, before nailing it to the Rostra.

Octavius was said to have held to strict principles in his politics and was known for his honesty. Plutarch, who discusses him in his lives of Marius and Lucius Cornelius Sulla, describes Gnaeus Octavius's character as "reputable". Unfortunately, he was also slow in action, which contributed to his ultimate failure against Cinna. He had at least one son, Lucius Octavius, who became consul in 75 BC.

Legend
Orange	Emperor	Green	Consul

Cn. Octavius Rufus q. c. 230 BC
Cn. Octavius pr. 205 BC	C. Octavius eq.
Cn. Octavius cos. 165 BC	C. Octavius tr. mil. 216 BC
Cn. Octavius cos. 128 BC	M. Octavius tr. pl. 133 BC	C. Octavius magistr.
Cn. Octavius cos. 87 BC	M. Octavius tr. pl.	C. Octavius procos. MAC. 60 BC
L. Octavius cos. 75 BC	Cn. Octavius cos. 76 BC	C. Octavius (Augustus) imp. ROM. 27 BC–AD 14
M. Octavius aed. 50 BC

== See also ==
- Octavia gens

== Footnotes ==
Political offices
Preceded by L. Cornelius Sulla; Q. Pompeius Rufus	Roman consul 87 BC; With: L. Cornelius Cinna; L. Cornelius Merula	Succeeded by L. Cornelius Cinna; Gaius Marius
