= Gaius Scribonius Curio (consul 76 BC) =

Famous Roman orator

- Died: 53 BC
- Spouse: Memmia
- Children: Gaius Scribonius Curio

Gaius Scribonius Curio (c. 124 – 53 BC) was a Roman statesman, soldier and a famous orator. He was nicknamed Burbuleius (after an actor) for the way he moved his body while speaking. Curio was noted as a public orator and for the purity of his Latin language.

== Career ==
He was probably born between 125 and 123 BC. In 90 BC, during the Social War, Curio was a tribune of the plebs. From 87 BC until 81 BC he served as a legate under Lucius Cornelius Sulla; First in Greece and Asia during Sulla's campaigns against king Mithridates of Pontus then against the Cinna-Marius faction during Sulla's civil war. During the First Mithridatic War he besieged the Athenian tyrant Aristion, who had taken position on the Acropolis, during the Siege of Athens.

In 76 BC, he was elected consul, along with Gnaeus Octavius. After his consulship he was allocated Macedonia as his proconsular command. He successfully fought the Dardani and the Moesians, for which the Senate granted him a triumph. He was the first Roman general to reach the Danube.

Curio was a member of the College of Pontiffs. He died in 53 BC.

== Cicero and Caesar ==
A friend of Cicero, he supported him during the Catiline Conspiracy. Curio spoke in favor of Publius Clodius Pulcher when he was on trial for violating the rites of Bona Dea, while Cicero spoke out against Clodius and Curio, though this did not interfere with their friendship. He became an opponent to Julius Caesar and wrote a political dialogue against him.

== Family ==
His son, also called Gaius Scribonius Curio, was made a praetor by Julius Caesar, and sent to Sicily and Africa to try and take these provinces for Caesar. There was a rumor that Curio Junior and Mark Anthony had an affair when they were young. When the two men had been banned from seeing each other by Curio Senior, Curio Junior smuggled Mark Anthony in through his father's roof.

Curio was married to Memmia, who was the sister of Gaius Memmius.

Political offices
Preceded by D. Junius Brutus; Mam. Aemilius Lepidus Livianus	Roman consul 76 BC; With: Gnaeus Octavius	Succeeded by L. Octavius; G. Aurelius Cotta
