= Lucius Octavius =

Roman consul in 75 BC

Lucius Octavius (c. 116 – 74 BC) was a Roman politician who was elected consul in 75 BC.

== Biography ==
A member of the plebeian gens Octavia, and the son of Gnaeus Octavius (consul 87 BC), Lucius Octavius was elected praetor by 78 BC at the latest. He is suspected by the historian Thomas Robert Shannon Broughton to have been the author of the Formula Octaviana, a law which provided for the restoration of property and money which had been obtained by violent acts, or by threats of violence.

In 75 BC Lucius Octavius was elected consul alongside Gaius Aurelius Cotta. During the later stages of his consulate, both Lucius Octavius and his colleague were attacked by crowds along the Via Sacra while they were campaigning on behalf of Quintus Caecilius Metellus Creticus’ campaign for the praetorship. Both men had to take refuge in Lucius Octavius’ house.

For his proconsular governorship, Lucius Octavius was allotted the province of Cilicia. He arrived there in early 74 BC, but died very shortly afterwards, just as the Third Mithridatic War was beginning. His replacement as governor was the consul Lucius Licinius Lucullus.

Legend
Orange	Emperor	Green	Consul

Cn. Octavius Rufus q. c. 230 BC
Cn. Octavius pr. 205 BC	C. Octavius eq.
Cn. Octavius cos. 165 BC	C. Octavius tr. mil. 216 BC
Cn. Octavius cos. 128 BC	M. Octavius tr. pl. 133 BC	C. Octavius magistr.
Cn. Octavius cos. 87 BC	M. Octavius tr. pl.	C. Octavius procos. MAC. 60 BC
L. Octavius cos. 75 BC	Cn. Octavius cos. 76 BC	C. Octavius (Augustus) imp. ROM. 27 BC–AD 14
M. Octavius aed. 50 BC

== See also ==
- Octavia (gens)

== Sources ==
- Broughton, T. Robert S., The Magistrates of the Roman Republic, Vol. II (1951)

Political offices
Preceded by Gaius Scribonius Curio and Gnaeus Octavius	Consul of the Roman Republic; 75 BC with Gaius Aurelius Cotta	Succeeded by Lucius Licinius Lucullus and Marcus Aurelius Cotta
