= Lex Aurelia de tribunicia potestate =

Roman law on public offices

The lex Aurelia de tribunicia potestate ("Aurelius's law on the power of tribunes") was a law introduced by the consul Gaius Aurelius Cotta in 75 BC. This law gave former tribunes of the plebs the right to hold further magistracies, which had been forbidden by the dictator Lucius Cornelius Sulla a few years earlier.

== Background ==
The constitutional reforms made by Sulla between 82 and 80 BC had comprehensively reduced the powers of the tribunate. Sulla's dislike of the office, and his view of it as dangerous due to its use by radical populares politicians, lead him to reduce both the scope of its powers and its prestige. By removing the right for tribunes of the plebs to hold further magistracies he drastically reduced the appeal of the post on the career path of ambitious politicians.

An earlier attempt to repeal these aspects of Sulla's constitution had been attempted in 78 BC by Marcus Aemilius Lepidus.

Cotta's law was limited in scope and did not restore the full powers of the tribunate. As an optimas and associate of Sulla, there is much discussion of his motivations in repealing Sulla's rulings; perhaps as a sop to pacify the Roman people in a period of famine, or perhaps to gather support for his brother Marcus Aurelius Cotta who was running for the consulship of 74 BC.

== See also ==
- Cursus honorum
- List of Roman laws
- Roman Law
