= Marcus Octavius (tribune of the plebs 133 BC) =

Roman senator and tribune in 133 BC

Marcus Octavius (Latin: M·OCTAVIVS·CN·F·CN·N, lived during the 2nd century BC) was a Roman tribune in 133 BC and a major rival of Tiberius Gracchus. He was a son of Gnaeus Octavius, the consul in 165 BC, and a brother to another Gnaeus Octavius, the consul in 128 BC. Through his brother, he was the paternal uncle of Gnaeus Octavius, the consul in 87 BC.

A serious and discreet person, he earned himself a reputation as an influential orator. Though they had originally been close friends, Octavius became alarmed by Gracchus's populist agenda and, at the behest of the Roman Senate, repeatedly vetoed Gracchus's programmes of land reform. Gracchus responded by ultimately having the Plebeian Assembly deprive him of his office and eject him from the Assembly's meeting place in 133 BC. This action led to a serious escalation in the confrontation between the traditionalists and the reformers. The action was unprecedented and contravened the mos maiorum (Latin phrase meaning "ancestral custom" or "way of the elders") leading to the overall destabilization of the Republic. The Octavii were linked with the Cornelii Scipiones politically throughout the preceding century. It was also common practice that the tribunes supported more influential politicians, such as Aulus Gabinius to Pompey the Great in 67 BCE or Curio for Caesar in 50 BCE.

The bill's proposed solution was to address the lack of manpower for the empire at that time. Nonetheless, despite it having been well thought through, it still called for the Republic to move past Roman traditions, controversial because keeping old traditions was very important to the political elites of Rome. Still, Tiberius stood his ground and went against tradition because he believed in the potential of his land reform programmes. Because of his opposition, Tiberius decided it would be best to remove Marcus Octavius from office. Now because Tiberius Gracchus's vote to determine whether or not Marcus Octavius should be removed from office was successful in the sense that it was decided in Tiberius's favor, things were able to change. Once Marcus Octavius was removed from office, the Plebeian tribunes came together and reached the decision that the veto of Tiberius's programmes of land reform should be nullified. Marcus Octavius's veto was nullified and voided because he was no longer in office; because of this, his decision was revoked and no longer valid.

The primary source for Marcus Octavius is Plutarch's life of Tiberius. According to Plutarch, Gaius Octavius was one of his descendants, thus making him an ancestor of Roman Emperor Augustus.

Family tree:

Legend
Orange	Emperor	Green	Consul

Cn. Octavius Rufus q. c. 230 BC
Cn. Octavius pr. 205 BC	C. Octavius eq.
Cn. Octavius cos. 165 BC	C. Octavius tr. mil. 216 BC
Cn. Octavius cos. 128 BC	M. Octavius tr. pl. 133 BC	C. Octavius magistr.
Cn. Octavius cos. 87 BC	M. Octavius tr. pl.	C. Octavius procos. MAC. 60 BC
L. Octavius cos. 75 BC	Cn. Octavius cos. 76 BC	C. Octavius (Augustus) imp. ROM. 27 BC–AD 14
M. Octavius aed. 50 BC

== See also ==
- Julio-Claudian dynasty
- Octavia (gens)
- Gracchi

== Sources ==
- Badian, Ernst (2016-03-07). "Octavius, Marcus, tribune, 133 BCE". Oxford Research Encyclopedia of Classics. Oxford University Press. doi:10.1093/acrefore/9780199381135.013.4507. ISBN 978-0-19-938113-5.
- Görne, Frank (2020). Die Obstruktionen in der Römischen Republik [The obstructions in the Roman Republic]. Historia Einzelschriften, vol. 264. Stuttgart: Steiner, ISBN 978-3-515-12754-7, esp. pp. 153–190.
- Münzer, Friedrich (1937). “Octavius 31” in Realencyclopädie der Classischen Altertumswissenschaft, vol. XVII,2, col. 1820–1822.
- Smith, W. (1880). Oarses-Zygia. A Dictionary of Greek and Roman Biography and Mythology. J. Murray. pp. 6–8.
