= Phila (Pieria) =

Coordinates: 39°55′12″N 22°37′09″E

Phila (Ancient Greek: Φίλα) was a fortified town of Macedon in Pieria toward Magnesia, 5 M.P from Herakleion on the way toward Tempe Vale. According to Stephanus of Byzantium, it was built by Demetrius II Aetolicus, and named after his mother Phila. It was occupied by the Romans when their army had penetrated into Pieria by the passes of Mount Olympus from Thessaly.

The site of Phila is tentatively located near modern Pyrgetos.
