= Octavia gens =

Ancient Roman family

The gens Octavia was a plebeian family at ancient Rome, which was raised to patrician status by Caesar during the first century BC. The first member of the gens to achieve prominence was Gnaeus Octavius Rufus, quaestor about 230 BC. Over the following two centuries, the Octavii held many of the highest offices of the state; but the most celebrated of the family was Gaius Octavius, the grandnephew and adopted son of Caesar, who was proclaimed Augustus by the senate in 27 BC.

== Origin ==
The Octavii originally came from the Volscian town of Velitrae, in the Alban Hills. The historian Suetonius writes,

There are many indications that the Octavian family was in days of old a distinguished one at Velitrae; for not only was a street in the most frequented part of town long ago called Octavian, but an altar was shown there besides, consecrated by an Octavius. This man was leader in a war with a neighbouring town, and when news of a sudden onset of the enemy was brought to him just as he chanced to be sacrificing to Mars, he snatched the entrails of the victim from the fire and offered them up half raw; and thus he went forth to battle, and returned victorious. There was, besides, a decree of the people on record, providing that for the future too the entrails should be offered to Mars in the same way, and the rest of the victims be handed over to the Octavii.

Towards the end of the Republic, it became fashionable for noble families to trace their origin to the gods and heroes of olden time, and accordingly in Suetonius we also read that the Octavii received the franchise from Lucius Tarquinius Priscus, the fifth King of Rome, and were enrolled among the patricians by his successor, Servius Tullius. They afterwards passed over to the plebeians, until the patrician rank was again conferred upon them by Caesar.

This story is not improbable in itself, but since neither Livy nor Dionysius mention the Octavii when they speak of Velitrae, and the Octavii do not appear in history till the latter half of the third century BC, the tradition connecting them with the Roman kings may be safely rejected. Augustus, in his memoirs, mentioned that his father was a novus homo with no senatorial background.

The nomen Octavius is a patronymic surname, derived from the Latin praenomen Octavius. Many other gentes obtained their nomina in this manner, including the Quinctii from Quintus, the Sextii from Sextus, and the Septimii from Septimus.

== Praenomina ==
The chief praenomina used by the Octavii were Gnaeus, Gaius, Marcus, and Lucius.

== Branches and cognomina ==
Most of the Octavii of the Republic were descended from Gnaeus Octavius Rufus, who had two sons, Gnaeus and Gaius. The descendants of the younger Gnaeus held many of the higher magistracies, but the descendants of Gaius remained simple equites, who did not rise to any importance. The great-grandfather of Augustus served as a military tribune during the Second Punic War, and survived the Battle of Cannae; however, when Marcus Antonius wished to throw contempt upon Augustus, he called this Gaius Octavius a freedman and a restio, or rope-maker. The first of this family who was enrolled among the senators was Gaius Octavius, the father of Augustus. It is quite uncertain whether the ancestors of Augustus had anything to do with rope-making. During the Republic, none of the Octavii of this stirps bore any cognomen other than Rufus, and even this is rarely mentioned. The surname, which means "red," may have been obtained by one of the Octavii because he had red hair.

A few other persons named Octavius were not descended from Gnaeus Octavius Rufus, or whose descent cannot be traced. They bore cognomina such as Balbus, Ligur, Marsus, and Naso. Balbus was a common surname, referring to one who stammers, while Naso is thought to refer to someone with a prominent nose. Ligur refers to one of the Ligures, the aboriginal people of Liguria, while Marsus refers to one of the Marsi, an ancient people of central Italy, who later allied with the Samnites.

== Members ==
This list includes abbreviated praenomina. For an explanation of this practice, see filiation.

=== Descendants of Gnaeus Octavius Rufus ===
- Gnaeus Octavius Rufus, quaestor circa 230 BC.
- Gnaeus Octavius Cn. f., praetor in 205 BC, during the Second Punic War; he obtained Sicily as his province, and captured eighty Carthaginian ships of burden. After the Battle of Zama, Scipio directed him to march on Carthage.
- Gaius Octavius Cn. f., the younger son of Gnaeus Octavius Rufus, he was a simple eques, who never attempted to rise any higher in the state.
- Gaius Octavius C. f. Cn. n., a military tribune in 216 BC, during the Second Punic War. He survived the Battle of Cannae, and in 205 served in Sicily under the praetor Lucius Aemilius Papus.
- Gnaeus Octavius Cn. f. Cn. n., commanded the Roman fleet during the war against Perseus, over whom he triumphed. He was consul in 165 BC, and erected the Porticus Octavia. He was assassinated at Laodiceia while on an embassy in 162.
- Marcus Octavius (Cn. f. Cn. n.), tribune of the plebs in 133 BC, opposed the agrarian law of his colleague, Tiberius Gracchus.
- Gnaeus Octavius L. f., a senator in 129 BC.
- Gnaeus Octavius Cn. f. Cn. n., consul in 128 BC; according to Cicero, he was accustomed to speaking in the courts of justice.
- Gaius Octavius C. f. C. n., the grandfather of Augustus, possessed considerable property, and lived quietly in his villa at Velitrae. He probably augmented his income by money-lending, for both Mark Antony and Cassius Parmensis called Augustus the grandson of a money-lender.
- Gnaeus Octavius Cn. f. Cn. n., consul in 87 BC, violently opposed the attempts of his colleague, Cornelius Cinna, to distribute the newly enfranchised Italian allies among all the 35 voting tribes, and to recall Gaius Marius from exile. In the ensuing civil war, Octavius was murdered in the consuls' chair by Cinna's partisans.
- Marcus Octavius Cn. f. Cn. n., tribune of the plebs in an uncertain year, brought forward a law raising the price at which corn was sold to the people.
- Gnaeus Octavius M. f. Cn. n., consul in 76 BC, and a minor orator, suffered such severe gout that he was unable to walk.
- Lucius Octavius Cn. f. Cn. n., consul in 75 BC; in the following year he died while proconsul of Cilicia, and was succeeded by Lucullus. He is frequently confounded with the jurist Lucius Octavius Balbus.
- Gaius Octavius C. f. C. n., the father of Augustus, was praetor in 61 BC. Subsequently proconsul of Macedonia, he defeated several Thracian tribes, and was saluted imperator by his troops. He died suddenly in 59.
- Marcus Octavius Cn. f. M. n., aedile in 50 BC, was a partisan of Pompeius during the Civil War.
- Octavia C. f. C. n., half-sister of Augustus, married Sextus Appuleius.
- Octavia C. f. C. n., sister of Augustus, married first Gaius Claudius Marcellus, consul in 50 BC, and second Mark Antony.
- Gaius Octavius C. f. C. n., the first Roman emperor, was the great-nephew of Julius Caesar, in whose will he was adopted. In 27 BC the senate proclaimed him Augustus.

=== Octavii Ligures ===
- Marcus Octavius Ligur, father-in-law of Publius Luicus Gamala.
- Marcus Octavius Ligur, a senator, and tribune of the plebs with his brother, Lucius, in 82 BC. Verres compelled him to come to Rome in 74 in order to defend his rights respecting an estate that he had inherited in Sicily, and then charged him the costs of the trial.
- Lucius Octavius Ligur, tribune of the plebs with his brother, Marcus, in 82 BC, he defended his brother's interests in Sicily from Verres during Marcus' absence. Perhaps the same person mentioned in one of Cicero's letters to Atticus.
- Octavia M. f., possibly sister of the two above and wife of Publius Lucilius Gamala

=== Octavii Balbi ===
- Lucius Octavius Balbus, an eminent legal scholar, and juror in the trial of Verres.
- Publius Octavius Balbus, juror in the trial of Oppianicus, possibly identical with Lucius Balbus.
- Gaius Octavius Balbus, was proscribed by the triumvirs in 42 BC. Although he had escaped his house, he went to his son's house when he heard that his son was to be slain, and there met his death after discovering the ruse.
- Octavius C. f. Balbus, the son of the proscribed Gaius Octavius Balbus, who rushed to his house when he heard that his son was to be put to death.

=== Octavii Laenates ===
- Marcus Octavius Laenas Curtianus, one of the distinguished men who supplicated the judges on behalf of Marcus Aemilius Scaurus, in 54 BC.
- Gaius Octavius Laenas, curator of the aqueducts in Rome from AD 34 to 38, during the reigns of Tiberius and Caligula.
- Octavia C. f. Sergia Plautilla, daughter of Gaius Octavius Laenas, the curator of the aqueducts, was the mother of the emperor Nerva.
- Octavia C. f., daughter of Gaius Octavius Laenas, curator of the aqueducts, was the wife of Quintus Veranius, consul in AD 49.
- Lucius Octavius C. f. Laenas, son of the curator of the aqueducts and father of the consul of 131 AD.
- Sergius Octavius Laenas Pontianus, consul in AD 131.

=== Others ===
- Gnaeus Octavius Ruso, quaestor in 105 BC under Marius, and praetor in an uncertain year prior to 91.
- Octavius Graecinus, one of the generals of Sertorius in Hispania, distinguished himself in battle against Pompeius in 76 BC. Four years later, he joined Perperna's conspiracy to murder Sertorius.
- Lucius Octavius, a legate of Pompeius during the war against the pirates, in 67 BC; succeeded Quintus Caecilius Metellus in the command of Crete, and received the submission of the Cretan towns.
- Lucius Octavius Naso, left his estate to Lucius Flavius, praetor designatus in 59 BC.
- Octavius, a legate in the army of Marcus Licinius Crassus, killed at the Battle of Carrhae in 53 BC.
- Lucius Octavius, detected in adultery by Gaius Memmius, and punished by him.
- Octavius Marsus, legate of Publius Cornelius Dolabella, who sent him into Syria with one legion in 43 BC. After the town of Laodiceia was betrayed into the hands of Gaius Cassius Longinus, Dolabella and Octavius put an end to their own lives.
- Marcus Octavius, commanded the center of Marc Antony's fleet at the Battle of Actium. Possibly identical with the aedile of 50 BC, or with Ligur, or Marsus.
- Lucius Octavius L. f. Rufus, a contemporary of Augustus, was military tribune in the Legio IV Scythica, became one of the municipal duumvirs, decurion, and augur at Suasa in Umbria.
- Marcus Octavius Herennius, originally a flute player, he became engaged in trade, and built a chapel to Hercules near the Porta Trigemina, at the foot of the Aventine Hill, supposedly in gratitude for having been delivered from pirates.
- Gaius Octavius Lampadio, a grammarian, who divided the poem of Naevius on the First Punic War into seven books.
- Octavius C. f. Fronto, a contemporary of Tiberius, he had been praetor, and in AD 16 spoke in the senate against the great luxury then prevailing.
- Publius Octavius, a noted epicurean during the reign of Tiberius.
- Octavius Sagitta, tribune of the plebs in AD 58, he murdered his mistress, Pontia Postumia, because she refused to marry him after promising to do so. He was condemned and exiled to an island, but returned to Rome following the death of Nero. In AD 70 the senate again condemned him and reinstated his punishment.
- Decimus Octavius Quartio, a citizen of Pompeii, whose house was discovered amongst the ruins.
- Manius Octavius T. f. Novatus, praefectus fabrum at Segobriga in Hispania Citerior, was the father of Manius Octavius Novatus, a Roman senator of the Flavian period.
- Manius Octavius M'. f. T. n. Novatus, a senator of the Flavian period, had been legate of the Legio VII Claudia, and proconsul. He was the father of Manius Octavius Maximus and Octavia Novata, mentioned in the same inscription from Segobriga.
- Manius Octavius M'. f. M'. n. Maximus, son of the senator Manius Octavius Novatus, and brother of Octavia Novata, named in the same inscription from Segobriga.
- Octavia M'. f. M'. n. Novata, daughter of the senator Manius Octavius Novatus, and sister of Manius Octavius Maximus, named in the same inscription from Segobriga.
- Sextus Octavius Fronto, consul suffectus in AD 86.
- Gaius Octavius Tidius Tossianus Lucius Javolenus Priscus, consul suffectus in AD 86.
- Octavius Rufus, a friend of the younger Pliny.
- Gaius Octavius Vindex, consul suffectus in AD 184.
- Gaius Octavius Appius Suetrius Sabinus, senator, twice consul in AD 214 and 240.
- Octavius Horatianus, a name sometimes assigned to the author of the Rerum Medicarum Libri Quatuor, usually attributed to the physician Theodorus Priscianus, who lived at Constantinople during the 4th century.

== See also ==
- List of Roman gentes
