= Heracleium (Pieria) =

City in ancient Pieria, Macedon

- Ἡράκλειον (Ancient Greek)
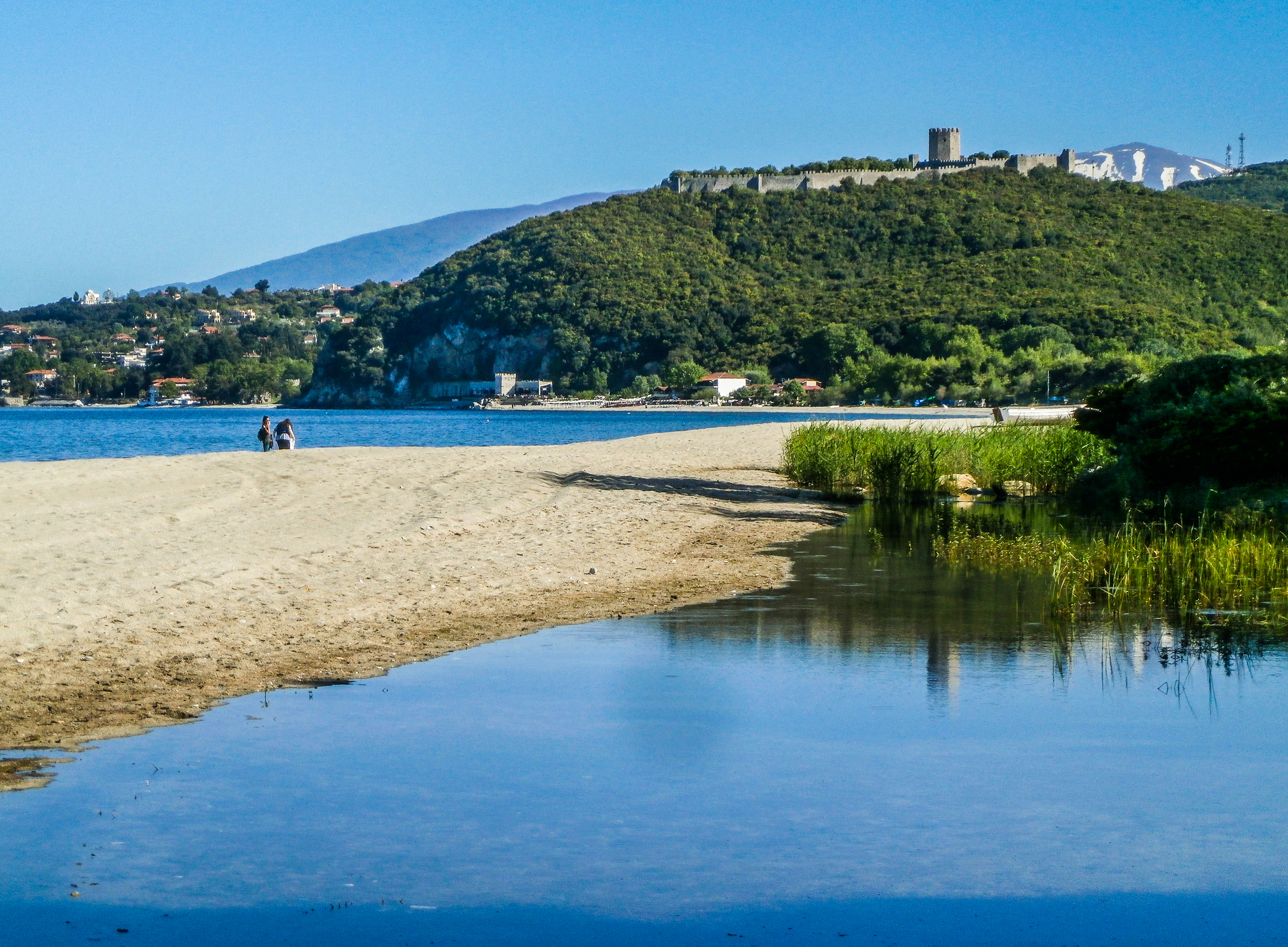
- Probable location of Herakleion at Fort Platamon. It controlled the mouth of the Vale of Tempe, the one easiest way over Mount Olympus from Macedon to Thessaly. It was, however, outflanked by more precipitous ways.

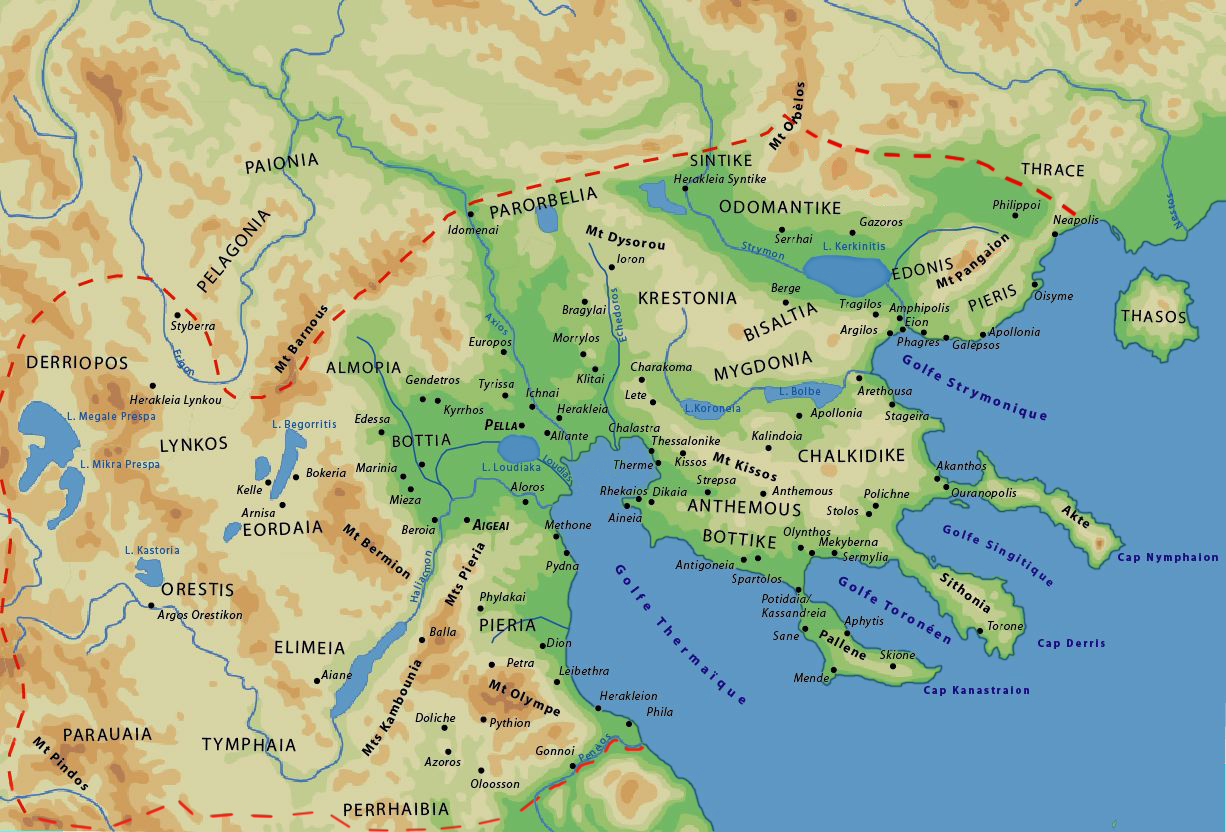
- 39°58′N 22°38′E

Heracleium or Herakleion (Ancient Greek: Ἡράκλειον) was a city on the south coast of ancient Pieria, Macedon, between Phila and Leibethra. During Peloponnesian War it passed into Athenian control in the years 430/29, 425/4 and 421 BCE. After Athenian alliance with Perdiccas II in 413 BCE it became again a city of Macedon.

The site of Heracleium is near the modern Platamon.

== Bibliography ==
- The Athenian Tribute Lists by Benjamin D. Meritt
- An Inventory of Archaic and Classical Poleis By Mogens Herman Hansen, Thomas Heine Nielsen
- Two Studies in Ancient Macedonian Topography - Page 46 by Miltiadēs V. Chatzopoulos, Louiza D. Loukopoulou
- CNN Transcript: Archaeologists Discover Ancient Cities Under Mediterranean
