= Gnaeus Octavius (consul 165 BC) =

Roman politician and general (died 162 BC)

Gnaeus Octavius (died 162 BC) was a Roman politician and general who served as consul in 165 BC and was the builder of the Porticus Octavia.

== Family background ==
Octavius belonged to the plebeian gens Octavia, which had emerged in the middle of the 3rd century. (Note: All dates BC unless specified otherwise.) Its first attested member was a Gaius Octavius Rufus, whose two sons founded the two branches of the gens, but the second one, to which later belonged Octavian (the future first Roman emperor Augustus), received much less honours during the Republic. The elder branch shows a progression in the cursus honorum: Octavius' grandfather Gnaeus Octavius was aedile curule and his father Gnaeus Octavius was praetor in 205. The latter notably fought at Cannae in 216 and commanded the fleet from his praetorship to the end of the Second Punic War in 202. He then participated in several diplomatic delegations in the Greek East: first with Flamininus in Macedonia in 197, then to refound Croton as a colony with Aemilius Paullus in 194, and again with Flamininus as legate in 192 at the beginning of the Syrian War. It seems Octavius' father was chosen for his expert knowledge of Greek culture. He probably died c.190, aged about 55.

== Career ==
=== Curule aedile (172 BC) ===
Octavius was perhaps quaestor c.180. His first mention in ancient sources is placed in 172 as curule aedile, an important position for ambitious individuals as aediles were tasked with organising games and corn-supply, two popular activities. The date of 170 is also possible, but modern scholars favour 172 due to Octavius' connection with the Popilli Laenates, who won consulships in 173 and 172.

=== Ambassador in Greece (170–169 BC) ===
In autumn 170, Octavius followed the steps of his father and went to Greece under the consul Aulus Hostilius Mancinus as legate together with Gaius Popillius Laenas, former consul in 172 when he was praetor. Their mission was to secure the loyalty of the Greek states while the Third Macedonian War against Perseus had broken out. Mancinus was wintering at Larisa in Thessaly, so Octavius and Laenas first went to nearby Boeotia, where they thanked the Thebans for their loyalty. They next went to the Peloponnese and brought the news of the senatus consultum that prohibited requisitions from a Roman officials without approuval of the senate. This decree was passed to protect the Greeks from the exactions that happened in the 170s. It was also a good way for the senate to better control Roman commanders. However, they also told in each city that they knew who were reluctant to support Rome, which created "anxiety" according to the historian Polybius, who was a direct witness of these events. A federal council of the Achaean League (the dominant state of the Peloponnese) was called at Aegium to receive Octavius and Popillius. Polybius describes a rumour that the Roman legates wanted to accuse Archon, Polybius and his father Lycortas of being against Rome at this occasion, but could not do so because they had no proof. The legates simply said a few cordial words before leaving. It seems that Octavius and Popillius had good reasons to suspect them as Lycortas advocated a neutral stance in the war against Perseus, in violation of the Achaean treaty with Rome, but Polybius' rumour is likely a reconstruction based on what happened to him after the war (he was taken prisoner to Rome). Despite the harsh comment of Polybius on Octavius, he was apparently appreciated in the Peloponnesian cities of Argos and Elis as inscriptions honouring him have been found there.

Octavius and Popillius then attended the meeting of the Aetolian League in Thermum, where they demanded hostages. It was likely a strategy to find who would oppose them, but the meeting ended with an Aetolian being stoned by the anti-Romans. The legates left without hostages to Acarnania, where they used a similar tactics of antagonising parties. At the meeting of the Acarnanian League in Thyrreum, some pro-Roman Acarnanians asked Roman to have garrisons in their cities—a request rejected by Diogenes, a leader of the anti-Romans. Octavius and Popillius did not install garrisons and returned to the consul Mancinus in Larisa. N. G. L. Hammond considers that Hostilius and his legates' tactics of threatening even the moderates "must have offset any goodwill which the senatorial decrees were designed to excite". Octavius then stayed with the consul for the rest of the winter, while Popillius was sent with a thousand soldier in Ambracia. It is probably in Larisa that Octavius met Athenagoras, who became his personal physician and is named on an inscription from the island of Kos. Octavius imitated a practice common among Hellenistic generals of having medics in their retinue.

In view of Octavius' rash behaviour in Greece, John Briscoe thinks that he belonged to a group of senators, whom he calls the "Fulvians", that dominated senatorial politics during most of the 170s. Hostilius and the Popillii Laenates were also members of this group. He characterises their activity in Greece as "arrogant and insensitive" and writes that they were responsible for the declaration of war against Perseus. Earlier, H. H. Scullard thought that Octavius was in the Scipionic group, which counted the Cornelii Scipiones and Aemilius Paullus and opposed the Fulvians.

Upon his return to Rome in 169, Octavius was appointed decemvir sacris faciundis, a priest in charge of the Sibylline Books, for which knowledge of Greek culture and religion was essential.

=== Praetor of the fleet (168 BC) ===
In 168, Aemilius Paullus was elected consul and was given the command of the war; Octavius was elected praetor and received the command of the fleet. This praetorian command was more independent than the other praetorships from the consul, who only conducted operations on land. Octavius and Paullus left Italy on 29 or 29 May 168; they arrived to Corcyra the same day, and to Delphi five days later, in 2 or 3 June. While the consul Paullus continued from there to Phila in Pieria, Octavius departed to meet with his fleet at Oreus, on the western tip of Euboea. The Roman fleet during the war counted about 40 ships, but could rely on the navies of Pergamon and Rhodes, which was enough to keep Perseus' fleet in its harbours. Perseus was even forced to disperse some of his forces (perhaps up to 10,000 men) in several coastal cities to protect them from Roman raids.

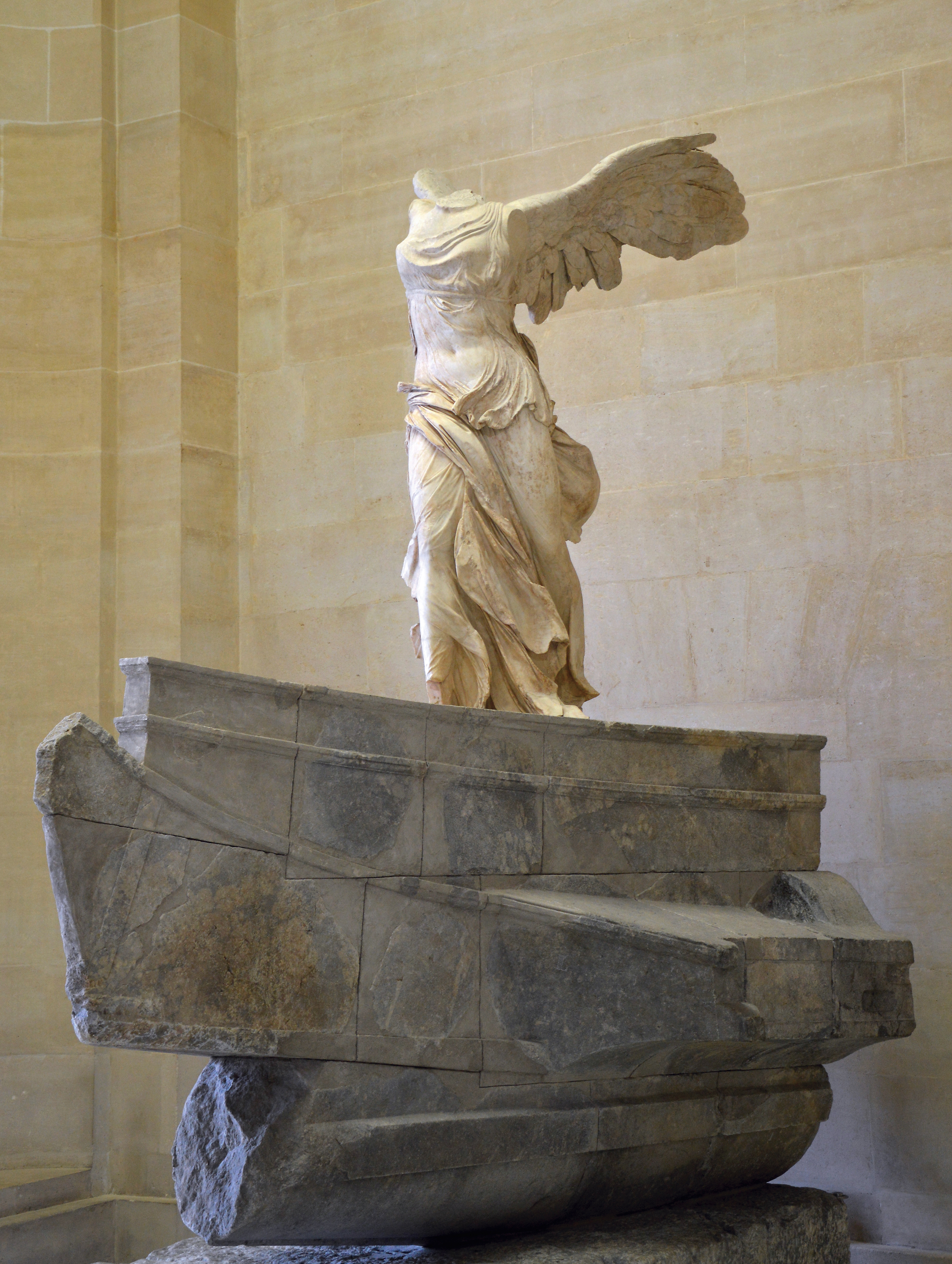
The Victory of Samothrace (Louvre, Paris), perhaps commissioned by Octavius after the capture of Perseus on this spot.

As Paullus could not break the front on the Elpeus river, he devised a ruse by ordering his military tribune Scipio Nasica to move south and feign an embarkment at Heracleum, where the fleet was stationed. The goal was to make Perseus believe that Scipio Nasica was about to land behind his lines, whereas he actually marched around Mt Olympus during the night in order to flank the Macedonian army. Therefore Octavius sailed north in that feigned operation, which successfully compelled Perseus to retreat to Pydna. The decisive battle of the war was fought there on 22 June; it resulted in a crushing Roman victory. Perseus retreated to Pella, then Amphipolis, and finally the island of Samothrace. Meanwhile, Octavius sacked the city of Meliboea on the coast of Magnesia. This city was famous for its refined fabrics, which Octavius looted as they were later listed in the triumphal booty of Paullus (the first time luxury textile was mentioned in a triumph). He then sailed to Samothrace in order to capture Perseus, who was protected by the sanctity of the Samothrace temples. Octavius therefore offered an amnesty to the followers of Perseus, who surrendered immediately, and left Perseus alone with his elder son. The king had no choice but to in turn surrender to Octavius, who therefore did not violate the temples with his army. Octavius brought Perseus to the legate Quintus Aelius Tubero in Amphipolis, who turned him to Paullus. Octavius finally wintered with the fleet in Demetrias in Thessaly. At this occasion, he was likely honoured with an inscription by the small city of Echinous on the Malian Gulf. Olga Palagia has suggested that Octavius commissioned the Victory of Samothrace, a famous statue now in the Louvre in Paris, in order to commemorate his capture of Perseus in the island, therefore imitating Paullus who built a monument in Delphi. However, there is no academic consensus on the statue, and many other dates are possible.

Most of the Roman officers in Macedonia were prorogued in their command in 167, including Paullus and Octavius, in order to implement the settlement of Perseus' former kingdom. Paullus conveyed an assembly with representatives from all the Macedonian cities in Amphipolis, where he announced the new organisation that would rule them. He addressed the assembly in Latin, but Octavius translated his words into Greek as he spoke. Paullus gathered the massive booty he took from Perseus in Amphipolis and boarded it in Octavius' ships, as well as some merchant cargoes. Octavius then left Macedonia to Italy; he possibly had to sail around the Peloponnese as the ships were too heavy to pass through the Isthmus of Corinth.

=== Triumph (167 BC) ===
Once in Rome, the senate granted a triumph to the three commanders of the war: Paullus, Octavius, and Lucius Anicius Gallus, another praetor who had fought in Illyria. Paullus' triumph was contested because his men found that their share of the booty was too small, but Livy adds that there was no opposition against the triumphs of Octavius and Gallus. Paullus offered 100 denarii to every foot soldier, 200 to centurions, and 300 to knights. Gallus gave 45, 90, and 150 to the same respective ranks. Octavius gave "75 denarii to each of the seamen, 150 denarii to the pilots of the ships and 300 denarii to the captains". Octavius' gifts were larger than Gallus' because he had less soldiers as commander of the navy, and also perhaps because he had a good relationship with Paullus, who shared more of his booty with him. Octavius' triumph was nevertheless much less ostentatious than that of Paullus, who paraded over three days (3–5 September 167) 500 carts of looted artworks as well as Perseus and his family. Octavius celebrated his on 6 September, but had no prisoner nor any spoil to show off. John Briscoe notes that Octavius did not do much to receive a triumph apart from capturing Perseus, but "in the prevailing euphoria, the senate was not going to refuse a triumph to one of the three commanders responsible for securing total victory". It was the last time in Roman history that a naval praetor celebrated a triumph.

=== Building program ===
Using the spoils from war, Octavius built a house on the Palatine Hill, increasing his status in Rome. It was at this time that Octavius also built the extravagant Porticus Octavia, which was restored by Augustus but was destroyed in the Great Fire of Rome, before the death of Pliny the Elder.

=== Consul (165 BC) ===
Octavius was elected consul in 165, alongside the patrician Titus Manlius Torquatus, therefore becoming a homo novus, the first member of his family to reach the consulship.

Very little is known on Octavius' consulship, because Livy's manuscript ends in 166, just before the account of his consulship. He is nevertheless mentioned in two Greek inscriptions. The first one reproduces a senatus consultum that followed a convocation of the senate by the consul Octavius, which deals with the royal lands that Perseus once held in Magnesia. The stone was found in Demetrias, the city where Octavius wintered in 168–167 and with which he had kept a good relationship. The stone is too damaged to detail further the content of the decree. Octavius as is also mentioned in a similar inscription reproducing the senatus consultum de privilegiis Delphorum, granting privileges to Delphi after a meeting of the senate called by Octavius.

=== Ambassador in Syria (162 BC) ===
In 162 BC, Octavius was sent as an ambassador to Syria with two colleagues, Spurius Lucretius and Lucius Aurelius. This was done with the pretext of enforcing the terms of the Peace of Apamea, although it may also have been as an excuse to weaken the Seleucid Empire in general. There, Octavius ordered the hamstringing of the Syrian war elephants as well as the burning of the Seleucid fleet to enforce the treaty. The regent, Lysias (on behalf of the young king Antiochus V Eupator), allowed this as he had little appetite for a war with Rome, but this act was deeply unpopular. Someone named Leptines of Laodicea assassinated Octavius at the gymnasium to avenge the slight to Seleucid honor and the death of the elephants.

The only source for this is the historian Polybius, who writes a stunning conclusion to the story. According to Polybius, Leptines was proud of his act and openly bragged of it, confident in the gods' approval. Another demagogue named Isocrates suggested killing the other Roman envoys, too. When Polybius's friend Demetrius I took control of the Seleucid Empire from Lysias, Leptines approached Demetrius of his own free will and asked to be sent to Rome to persuade the Senate of the justness of his actions. Demetrius sent Leptines, Isocrates, and a present of a crown valued at 10,000 gold pieces to Rome. The Senate blandly responded to Demetrius, gave Leptines a hearing, and set him free.

Various historians have attempted to explain what happened here, although most think that Polybius is leaving something out or slanting the story in some way, as the Senate "in a fit of insanity, publicly released the avowed murderer of their chief legate, rewarding Leptines' open defiance of Rome's will" seems unbelievable without some additional reason. Chris Seeman suggests that perhaps the Senate sought to save face as Octavius had been part of a delegation that still ultimately supported Antiochus V's rule rather than Demetrius's, and disavowing Octavius as a representative would allow Rome to recognize Demetrius's rule more easily without seemingly changing their mind on a dime.

== Descendants ==
Octavius had at least three children. The eldest was Gnaeus Octavius, elected consul in 128, but nothing is known of his consulship. Another son named Marcus was tribune of the plebs in 133; he is mostly known for having opposed his colleague the famous reformer Tiberius Gracchus. A third son named Lucius is only known through the filiation of his son, a senator at the end of the 2nd century.

== Bibliography ==
=== Ancient sources ===
- Cicero, De officiis.
- Livy, Ab Urbe Condita.
- Polybius, The Histories.

=== Modern sources ===
- Nathan Badoud, "La Victoire de Samothrace, défaite de Philippe V", Revue archéologique, 2018/2 (n° 66), pp. 279–306.
- Lawrence J. Bliquez, "Gnaeus Octavius and the Echinaioi", Hesperia: The Journal of the American School of Classical Studies at Athens, Vol. 44, No. 4 (Oct. - Dec., 1975), pp. 431–434.
- T. Corey Brennan, The Praetorship in the Roman Republic, Oxford University Press, 2000, ISBN 978-0-19-511460-7
- John Briscoe, "Q. Marcius Philippus and Nova Sapientia", The Journal of Roman Studies, 1964, Vol. 54, Parts 1 and 2 (1964), pp. 66–77.
- ——, "Eastern Policy and Senatorial Politics 168-146 B.C.", Zeitschrift für Alte Geschichte, Bd. 18, H. 1 (Jan., 1969), pp. 49–70.
- T. Robert S. Broughton, The Magistrates of the Roman Republic, American Philological Association, 1951–1952.
- Pierre Charneux, "Rome et la confédération achéene (automne 170)", Bulletin de Correspondance Hellénique, 81, 1957, pp. 181–202.
- Etienne Famerie, "Aspects diplomatiques de la politique romaine dans l'orient grec (IIe s. av. J.-C.)", Ecole Pratique des Hautes Etudes, Annuaire, résumés des conférences et travaux, 144^{e} année, 2011-2012, pp. 46–52.
- Luise Hallof, Klaus Hallof, Christian Habicht, "Aus der Arbeit der «Inscriptiones Graecae» II. Ehrendekrete aus dem Asklepieion von Kos", Chiron, Issue 28, 1998, pp. 101–142.
- N. G. L. Hammond & F. W. Walbank, A History of Macedonia, volume III, 336-167 B. C., Oxford, Clarendon Press, 1988. ISBN 0198148151
- Olga Palagia, "The Victory of Samothrace and the Aftermath of the Battle of Pydna", in Olga Palagia & Bonna D. Wescoat (editors), Samothracian connections, Essays in honor of James R. McCredie, Oxford and Oakville, Oxbow Books, 2010, pp. 154–164. ISBN 978-1-84217-970-3
- August Pauly, Georg Wissowa, Elimar Klebs, Friedrich Münzer, Franz Miltner, et alii, Realencyclopädie der Classischen Altertumswissenschaft (abbreviated RE), J. B. Metzler, Stuttgart, 1894–1980.
- Leena Pietilä-Castrén, "New Men and Greek War Booty in the 2nd Century BC", Arctos, Acta Philologica Fennica, XVI, 1982, pp. 121–144.
- ——, "The ancestry and career of Cn. Octavius, COS 165 BC", Arctos, Acta Philologica Fennica, vol. XVIII, 1984, pp. 75–92.
- Jörg Rüpke, Anne Glock, David Richardson (translator), Fasti Sacerdotum: A Prosopography of Pagan, Jewish, and Christian Religious Officials in the City of Rome, 300 BC to AD 499, Oxford University Press, 2008.
- Robert K. Sherk, Roman Document from the Greek East, Senatus Consulta and Epistulae to the Age of Augustus, Baltimore, The Johns Hopkins Press, 1969.
- ——, Translated Documents of Greece and Rome vol. 4, Rome and the Greek East to the Death of Augustus, Cambridge University Press, 1984. ISBN 9780521271233

| Preceded by Marcus Claudius Marcellus and Gaius Sulpicius Galus | Consul of the Roman Republic with Titus Manlius Torquatus; 165 BC | Succeeded by Quintus Cassius Longinus and Aulus Manlius Torquatus |
