= Gnaeus Octavius (consul 128 BC) =

Politician of the Roman Republic, 128 BC

Gnaeus Octavius (fl. 133–126 BC) was a politician of the Roman Republic. He was praetor c. 131 BC and consul in 128 BC, but his life is mostly unknown apart from a few inscriptions and an anecdote from Cicero.

== Family background ==
Octavius belonged to the plebeian gens Octavia, which had emerged in the middle of the 3rd century BC. Its first attested member was a Gaius Octavius Rufus, whose two sons founded the two branches of the gens, but the second one, to which later belonged Octavian (the future first Roman emperor Augustus), received much less honours during the Republic. The elder branch shows a constant progression in the cursus honorum: Octavius's great-grandfather Gnaeus Octavius was aedile curule, his grandfather Gnaeus Octavius was praetor in 205, and his father Gnaeus Octavius was consul in 165. The latter had an impressive career, which mostly took place in the Greek East. He notably captured the last Macedonian king Perseus in 168 and received a triumph as a result. He was murdered in 162 while on a mission in Laodicea in Syria.

Octavius had a younger brother named Marcus Octavius, who is only known as tribune of the plebs in 133. That year, he attempted to veto the social program of his colleague Tiberius Gracchus.

== Career ==
According to the lex Villia, consuls had to be former praetors and there had to be an interval of two years between magistracies. Since Octavius was consul in 128, his praetorship took place in 131 or closely before. Octavius was probably praetor at the beginning of the war against Aristonicus, a claimant to the throne of Pergamon. The last king of Pergamon, Attalus III (r. 138–133) had bequeathed his kingdom to Rome in 133, but his half-brother Aristonicus revolted in 133 and tried to maintain the independence of Pergamon. Octavius's involvement in the war is known thanks to an inscription found on the island of Delos, which was initially thought to refer to the Gnaeus Octavius who was consul in 87, but reassigned to Octavius by Ernst Badian. His praetorian command of the fleet in the Aegean Sea was the same as his father during the Third Macedonian War in 168.

Octavius was elected consul in 128 alongside the other plebeian Titus Annius Rufus. Nothing is known on their consulship.

Octavius is mentioned during a trial by Cicero in his dialogue De oratore. Marcus Licinius Crassus Agelastus is described as the praetor, and therefore judge of the trial, dated from 126. In this civil case, a ward accused his guardian of having mismanaged his affairs; Octavius was the lawyer of the guardian, while the ward's lawyer was Marcus Plautius Hypsaeus, later consul in 125. Cicero tells that Octavius's and Hypsaeus's introductory speeches were so bad that Crassus mocked them. The jurist and consul in 133, Publius Mucius Scaevola was also a member of the jury.

== Descendants ==
The consul of 87, Gnaeus Octavius is often mentioned as Octavius's elder son, but Ernst Badian rejected this filiation, as he showed that this Gnaeus Octavius's father was more likely named Quintus. Scholars writing after Badian mostly agree with him, but they are unable to connect the consul of 87 with the other members of the family. Badian notes that Octavius still had a son named Gnaeus, but he did not leave any mark in history, or perhaps died young.

Octavius's first attested son was Lucius Octavius, consul in 75. A second known son was Marcus Octavius; as tribune of the plebs between 99 and 85, he repealed the law of Gaius Gracchus that had established the grain dole. Lucius and Marcus Octavius, as well as the consul of 87, all supported conservative (also described as Optimate) politics at the beginning of the first century BC.

== Bibliography ==
=== Ancient sources ===
- Cicero, De oratore.

=== Modern sources ===
- Michael C. Alexander, Trials in the Late Roman Republic, 149 BC to 50 BC, University of Toronto Press, 1990, ISBN 978-0-8020-5787-7.
- Ernst Badian, Studies in Greek and Roman History, Oxford, Basil Blackwell, 1968.
- ——, "The Consuls, 179-49 BC", Chiron, 20, 1990, pp. 371–414.
- T. Corey Brennan, The Praetorship in the Roman Republic, Oxford University Press, 2000, ISBN 978-0-19-511460-7
- T. Robert S. Broughton, The Magistrates of the Roman Republic, American Philological Association, 1951–1952.
- Jean-Christophe Couvenhes & Henri-Louis Fernoux, Les Cités grecques et la guerre en Asie mineure à l’époque hellénistique, Tours, Presses universitaires François-Rabelais, 2018. ISBN 978-2-86906-354-9 p. 32 (note 4).
- August Pauly, Georg Wissowa, Elimar Klebs, Friedrich Münzer, Franz Miltner, et alii, Realencyclopädie der Classischen Altertumswissenschaft (abbreviated RE), J. B. Metzler, Stuttgart, 1894–1980.
- Leena Pietilä-Castrén, "New Men and Greek War Booty in the 2nd Century BC", Arctos, Acta Philologica Fennica, XVI, 1982, pp. 121–144.
- ——, "The ancestry and career of Cn. Octavius, COS 165 BC", Arctos, Acta Philologica Fennica, vol. XVIII, 1984, pp. 75–92.
- O. Tellegen, "Roman Law and Rhetoric", Revue belge de philologie et d'histoire, tome 84, fasc. 1, 2006, pp. 59–75.
- David Wardle, Suetonius, Life of Augustus, Oxford University Press, 2014. ISBN 978-0-19-968645-2

Preceded by Gaius Sempronius Tuditanus and Manius Aquillius	Consul of the Roman Republic with Titus Annius Rufus; 128 BC	Succeeded by Lucius Cassius Longinus Ravilla and Lucius Cornelius Cinna
