= Gaius Caesar =

Grandson and heir of Augustus (20 BC – 4 AD)

- Princeps iuventutis
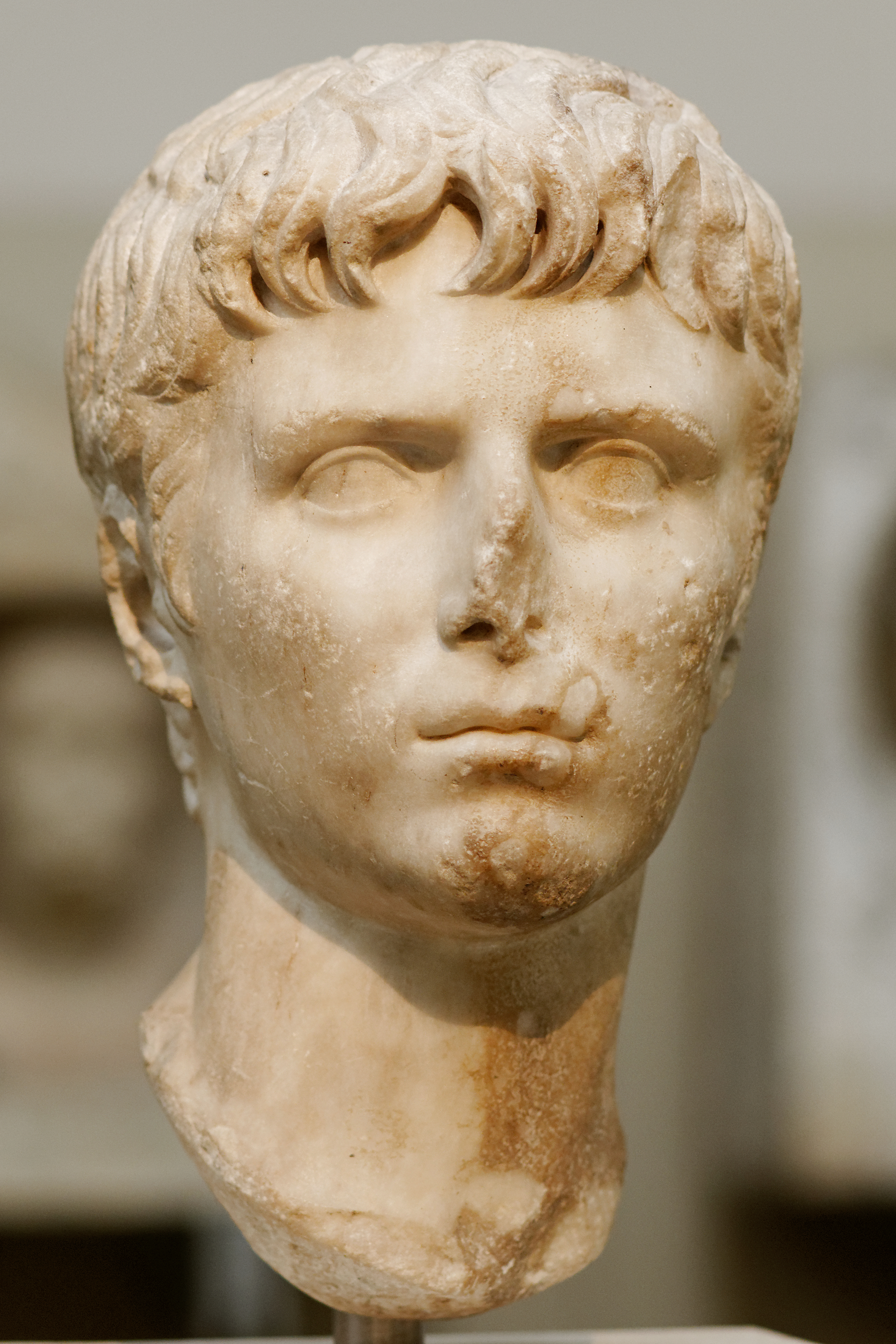
- Bust, British Museum
- Born: 20 BC; Rome
- Died: 21 February 4 AD (aged 23); Limyra, Lycia, Anatolia
- Burial: Mausoleum of Augustus
- Spouse: Livilla
Names
- Gaius Vipsanius Agrippa; Gaius Julius Caesar (17 BC)
- Dynasty: Julio-Claudian
- Father: Marcus Vipsanius Agrippa; Augustus (adoptive)
- Mother: Julia the Elder

Gaius Julius Caesar (20 BC – 21 February 4 AD) was a grandson and heir to the throne of Roman emperor Augustus, alongside his younger brother Lucius Caesar. Although he was born to Marcus Vipsanius Agrippa and Julia, Augustus' only daughter, Gaius and Lucius were raised by their grandfather as his adopted sons and joint-heirs. He experienced an accelerated political career befitting a member of the Julio-Claudian dynasty, with the Roman Senate allowing him to advance his career without first holding a quaestorship or praetorship, offices that ordinary senators were required to hold as part of the cursus honorum.

In 1 BC, Gaius was given command of the eastern provinces, after which he concluded a peace treaty with King Phraates V of Parthia on an island in the Euphrates. Shortly afterwards, he was appointed to the office of consul for the following year, 1 AD. The year after Gaius' consulship, Lucius died at Massilia in the month of August. Approximately eighteen months later, Gaius died of an illness in Lycia. He was married to his second cousin Livilla but they did not have children. In 4 AD, following the deaths of Gaius and Lucius, Augustus adopted his stepson, Tiberius, as well as his sole-surviving grandson, Agrippa Postumus.

== Background ==
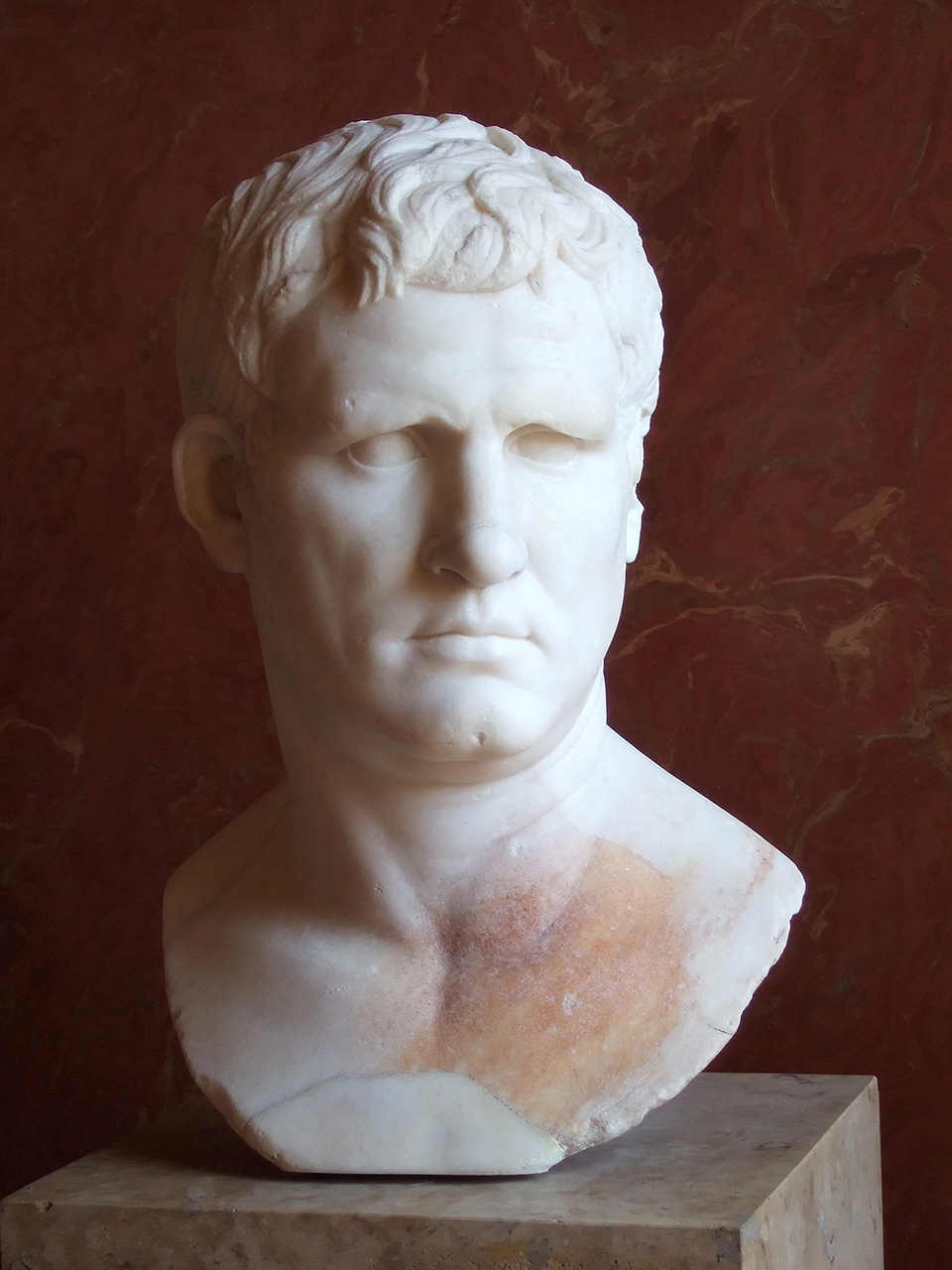
Bust of Gaius's father, Marcus Vipsanius Agrippa

Marcus Vipsanius Agrippa was an early supporter of Augustus (then "Octavius") during the Final War of the Roman Republic that ensued as a result of the assassination of Julius Caesar in 44 BC. He was a key general in Augustus' armies, commanding troops in pivotal battles against Mark Antony and Sextus Pompeius. From early on, Agrippa was trusted to handle affairs in the eastern provinces and was even given the signet ring of Augustus, who was seemingly on his deathbed in 23 BC, a sign that he would become princeps were Augustus to die. However, as soon as he recovered, Augustus began to show he favored his nephew, Marcus Claudius Marcellus, then just 19. However, Marcellus died of an illness that had spread throughout the city of Rome that year.

With Marcellus gone, Augustus arranged for the marriage of Agrippa to his daughter Julia the Elder, who was previously the wife of Marcellus. Agrippa was given tribunicia potestas ("the tribunician power") in 18 BC, a power that Augustus received in 23 BC, and later on was exercised only by the emperor and shared with some heirs (Agrippa, Tiberius). The tribunician power allowed him to control the Senate. Agrippa acted as tribune in the Senate to pass important legislation and, though he lacked some of the emperor's power and authority, he was approaching the position of co-regent.

== Early life and family ==
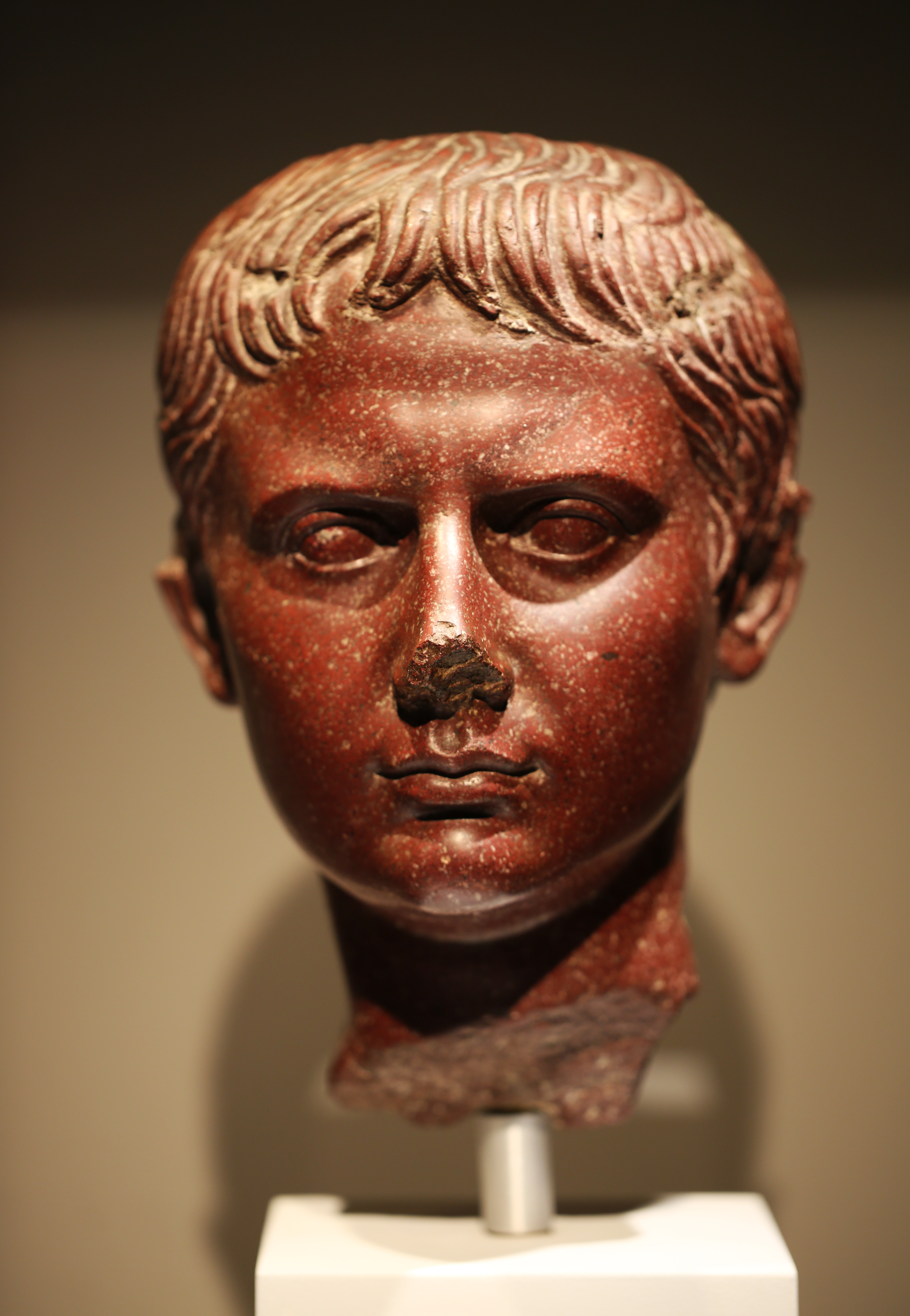
Gaius Caesar

Gaius was born in Rome in 20 BC to Marcus Vipsanius Agrippa and Julia the Elder. He was a part of the Julio-Claudian dynasty, and was related to all the Julio-Claudian emperors. On his mother's side, he was the oldest grandson of emperor Augustus. He was the stepson of Tiberius by his mother Julia's marriage to him, and brother in law of Claudius by his sister Agrippina the Elder's marriage to Germanicus. He also was the uncle of Caligula, who was the son of his sister Agrippina. The last emperor of the dynasty was Nero, who was Gaius' great-nephew and the grandson of Germanicus. An annual sacrifice on his birthday was granted in a decree.

In 17 BC, his brother Lucius was born. Augustus immediately adopted both Gaius and Lucius from their father by a symbolic sale, and named both Gaius and Lucius his (personal) heirs. It is unknown what their father thought of the adoption. Their adoptive father initiated them into administrative life when they were still young, and sent them to the provinces as consuls-elect. Augustus taught Gaius and Lucius how to read, swim, and the other elements of education, taking special pains to train them to imitate his own handwriting, mostly by himself. Shortly after their adoption in the summer, Augustus held the fifth-ever Ludi Saeculares ("Secular Games"). The adoption of the boys coupled with the games served to introduce a new era of peace – the Pax Augusta.

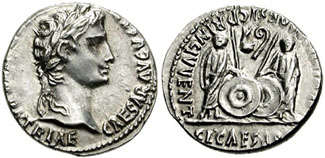
Gaius and Lucius Caesar standing with shields and spears between them; simpulum and lituus above.

That year his family left for the province of Syria, because Agrippa was given command of the eastern provinces with proconsular imperium maius. Four years later, in 13 BC, Gaius took part in the Trojan games with the other patrician youths at the dedication of the Theatre of Marcellus. Also in 13 BC, Agrippa and Augustus returned to Rome. Augustus sent Agrippa to Pannonia at the end of 13 to suppress a rebellion. Agrippa arrived there that winter (in 12 BC), but the Pannonians gave up their plans. Agrippa returned to Campania in Italy, where he fell ill and died soon after. The death of Gaius' father made succession a pressing issue. The aurei and denarii issued in 13–12 BC made clear the Emperor's dynastic plans for Gaius and Lucius.

The luxurious rural villa-estate at Ossaia near Cortona was owned by Gaius and Lucius Caesar.

Their father was no longer available to assume the reins of power if the Emperor were to die, and Augustus had to make it clear who his intended heirs were in case anything should happen. To learn about military affairs, he accompanied Tiberius in his campaign against the Sicambri in 8 BC. The year before, Tiberius' brother Drusus the Elder died on his way back from a campaign across the Rhine. Tiberius was given command of Germania, and waged two campaigns across the Rhine in 8 BC and 7 BC. He marched his army between the Elbe and the Rhine, and met little resistance, except from the Sicambri. Tiberius came close to exterminating the Sicambri, and had those who survived transported to the Roman side of the Rhine, where they could be watched more closely.

== Career ==
=== Early political career ===
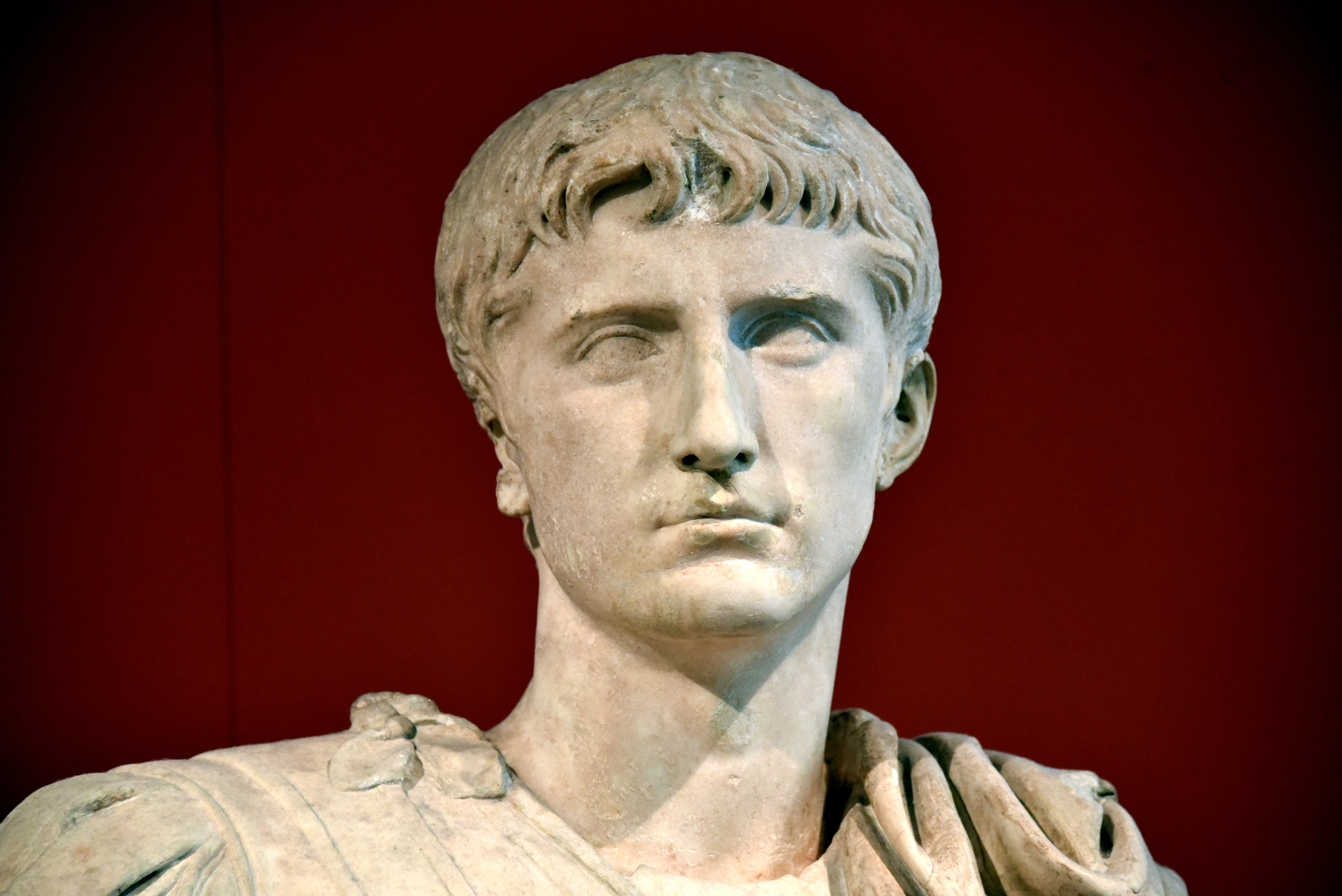
Statue of a Julio-Claudian prince. The head probably depicts Gaius Caesar, made 5 BC-14 AD. Altes Museum, Berlin

Gaius was designatus by the Comitia Centuriata in 6 BC with the intention that he should assume the consulship in his twentieth year. The next year, Augustus made him a pontifex, and granted him the right to attend Senate meetings, behold spectacles, and to be present at banquets with senators. Roman support for the young prince soon spread through Italy; statues and inscriptions were set up in every district to commemorate the fact that he had been nominated as a consul at an unprecedented age of fourteen.

The following year (5 BC), when he attained military age, he assumed the toga virilis, and was introduced by Augustus to the Senate, who declared him as princeps iuventutis ("leader of the youth") and sevir turmae (commander of a cavalry division). Having been designated consul, he was allowed to give his opinion to the senate. Lucius, three years his junior, was granted the same honours after the appropriate interval had elapsed.

=== Herodian succession ===
Following the death of King Herod of Judaea in 4 BC, his sons Antipas and Archelaus both came to Rome with their own copy of Herod's will to plead their case as to why they each deserved to inherit their father's kingdom. Augustus, as usual, declined the sole responsibility of the decision. He convened a council of senators, among whom he included Gaius. The council decided to ratify the will brought by Archelaus, which included a large bequest to Augustus and his wife Livia. The cities of Judaea rose in revolt after the procurator, Sabinus, garrisoned Syria Palaestina to guard the tens of millions of sesterces promised to the Emperor. The governor of Syria, Varus, was forced to bring in the legions from Syria to restore order.

At the same time, King Phraates IV of Parthia had seized Armenia with the help of Armenian nationalists, and expelled Tigranes IV, the king installed by Rome. Historian Ferrero speculates that Phraates may have been hoping to use Armenia as a bargaining chip to secure the release of his sons who were held captive by the Romans. Roman supremacy in Asia depended on its possession of Armenia as a protectorate. Before Rome could deal with the Parthians in Armenia, it would first need to make its Syrian legions available, which were still tied down in Palestine. In order to free up the legions there, the Kingdom of Judaea was divided among the sons of Herod the Great. One half remained under Archelaus, while the other half was subdivided between his brothers, Antipas and Philip. This served to restore stability to the region, whilst keeping Judaea from becoming powerful. Having settled matters in Judaea, the Emperor decided to deploy an army to Armenia to re-establish its status as a Roman protectorate and to show the eastern world that Rome held dominion over all land as far as the Euphrates.

=== Command in Asia ===
==== Departure ====
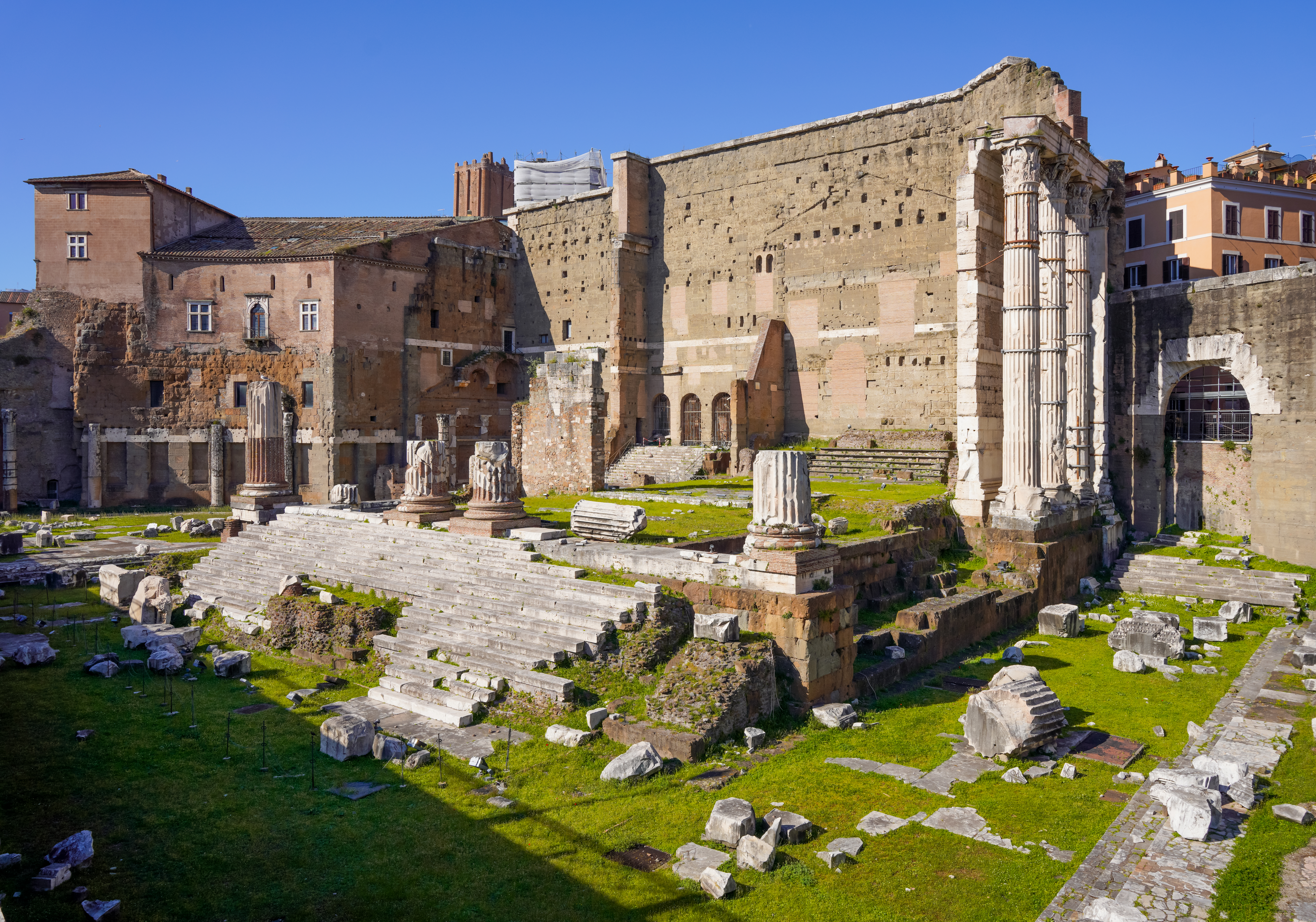
Remains of the Forum of Augustus with the Temple of Mars Ultor

Due to his advanced age, Augustus was unable to travel to the east himself. There were few to whom the Emperor could entrust matters in the east, but he was confident in Gaius. Gaius made a good choice because his presence represented that of the imperial family – all orders, promises, or threats coming from him were as valid as if they came from the Emperor himself. Nonetheless, he was only eighteen, and therefore too young for the conduct of important business.

Before leaving for the east, he and his brother Lucius were given the authority to consecrate buildings, and they did, with their management of the games held to celebrate the dedication of the Temple of Mars Ultor (1 August 2 BC). His youngest brother, Postumus, participated in the Trojan game with the rest of the equestrian youth. 260 lions were slaughtered in the Circus Maximus, there was gladiatorial combat, a naval battle between the "Persians" and the "Athenians", and 36 crocodiles were slaughtered in the Circus Flaminius. (Note: Cassius Dio reports that, after the games, Gaius was given command of the legions on the Ister (Danube), and that he did not take part in actions as he was there to learn (Dio, LV.10).)

Friends of Augustus had hoped that he would abandon his plan of sending Gaius to the east but, faced with increasing troubles there, he persisted with the plan and dispatched Gaius to Syria at the beginning of 1 BC. The Emperor entrusted Gaius with proconsular authority and had him marry his second cousin Livilla, the daughter of Drusus the Elder and Antonia Minor.

Due to Gaius' youth and inexperience, the Emperor had advisors go with him. Among his entourage to the east were: Marcus Lollius as adiutor ("helper"), Publius Sulpicius Quirinus as rector ("guide"), the future historian Velleius Paterculus, Lucius Domitius Ahenobarbus (grandfather of Nero), Juba II of Numidia, and future praetorian prefect Sejanus.

On his way to Syria, Gaius met with Tiberius, who had abandoned politics and retired to Rhodes. According to Suetonius, Gaius gave Tiberius a cold reception on the isle of Samos. Tiberius was alienated at the meeting, by the behaviour of both Lollius and Gaius' centurions. Suetonius further wrote that Tiberius wrote to the Emperor that Lollius should be replaced. Lollius' rivalry with Tiberius continued even after Gaius and his entourage reached Syria. Lollius strove to turn Gaius against Tiberius; Gaius, in any case, had no affection for the man who had contributed, directly or indirectly, to the ruin of his mother. (Note: In 2 BC, Julia the Elder was forced into exile after she had received a letter in Tiberius' name. She was deemed guilty of committing adultery on multiple accounts by her father Augustus (Dio, LV.10; Suetonius, The Lives of the Twelve Caesars. "Augustus", 65).) On one occasion, Lollius offered to decapitate Tiberius if Gaius gave the word. Suetonius wrote that it was Lollius' growing influence that compelled Tiberius to plead with Augustus for his return to Rome.

==== Consulship ====
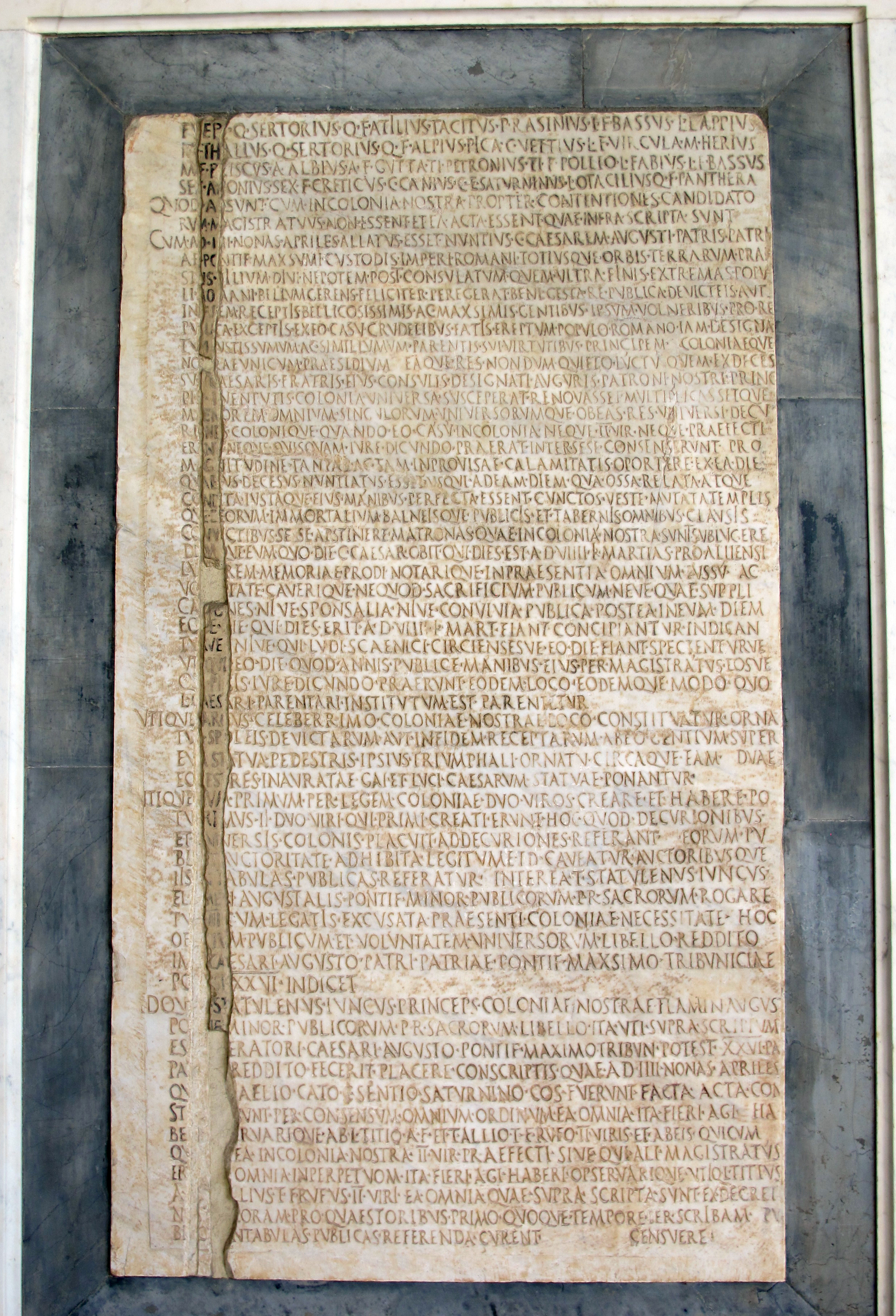
Latin inscription from the cenotaph to Gaius and Lucius Caesar in Pisa (CIL XI, 1421)

The next year, on 1 January, he entered the consulship in absentia with his brother-in-law, Lucius Aemilius Paullus, in accordance with the decision of 6 BC which named him consul designate. Gaius, who was twenty, had reached Asia, and was probably at Antioch at the time his consulship commenced, where he was organizing an army for the invasion of Armenia and opening negotiations with Phraates in the hopes of securing an agreement. The Emperor did not desire an open war, and the king of Parthia seemed open to peace. Negotiations were probably hastened by the presence of Gaius' army in Syria, which threatened Parthia. From every corner, the young consul was visited by envoys offering requests and paying homage. This year, monuments were raised to him and to his brother as the son of Ares or as Ares himself.

His inexperience meant he was forced to rely on his companions, namely the unruly Lollius, who had taken advantage of the powers he held, and was reportedly holding towns, individuals, and even sovereign princes for ransom. After Gaius opened negotiations with Phraates, Lollius offered the Parthian king certain concessions in return for money.

Preparations for the war continued into the spring and summer of 1 AD, at which point there had been a successful breakthrough in negotiations. As Phraates was not willing to go to war, he agreed to evacuate Armenia and abandon his brothers who were still in Roman captivity. In the second half of the year, Gaius had advanced with his army to the Parthian frontier to an unknown spot and brought Phraates to a final agreement on the proposals, in which he renounced all claims to Armenia and all power over his half-brothers.

It was about this time that Augustus passed through Judea and commended Gaius for not offering prayers at Jerusalem, as it would have been provocative to the Jews living there.

==== Expedition in Arabia ====
Sometime in the course of his time in the east, Gaius led an expedition into Arabia. Exactly where and for what purpose remains uncertain, though Pliny mentioned it in connection with Aelius Gallus' exploits in South Arabia. The term "Arabia" is never defined, and the term was used loosely by Roman sources. Various reasons, such as an attempt by Rome to control the incense trade, have been suggested but never proven. Juba II, former king of Mauretania, accompanied Gaius to the east. In order to prepare Gaius for his encounter with the Arabs, Juba wrote him a treatise. According to Pliny, the young prince made it as far as the Gulf of Aqaba. It is certain that this expedition happened before his time in Armenia, and, referencing Gaius' cenotaph in Pisa, it is almost certain to have taken place during his consulship.

Author and historian John Grainger places Gaius' expedition at the Gulf of Aqaba, or in Nabataea. It is known that the Nabataean Kingdom later became the province of Arabia, and so, it might be that Gaius conducted his "Arabian expedition" to either support or to discipline the King of Nabataea, Aretas IV. This is probably evidenced by the continuation of coinage in the king's name after Gaius' consulship.

Cassius Dio, in a fragmentary notice, mentions trouble in Egypt which was suppressed by a tribune of the Praetorian Guard. It is very likely this man was part of Gaius' entourage, but other than that nothing is known of him.

==== Supremacy in Armenia ====
Map of Armenia and the Roman client states in eastern Asia Minor

In the year following his consulship, in spring, he had held a meeting with Phraates on the bank of the Euphrates, in which a banquet was held to celebrate a peace treaty. It was here that Phraates, offended by Lollius, disclosed the guardian's secret negotiations to Gaius. It was for the crime of extorting presents from kings (regnum muneribus) that Lollius lost the friendship of Gaius and drank poison. Pliny says he amassed a fortune from his crimes and that, as a result, his granddaughter could afford to wear jewelry worth 40,000,000 sesterces, a considerable amount of money. The death of Lollius was fortunate to Tiberius, after which Gaius consented to his return to Rome and consequent return to Roman politics.

At the same time, the throne of Armenia had become vacant and, with permission from the Emperor, Gaius placed Ariobarzanes II of Atropatene on the throne. The Romans weren't the only ones interested in Armenia: the Parthians stirred up a revolt among nationalists in the nation. A large force of rebels had occupied the fortress in the city of Artagira. Gaius was drawn into the conflict, and invaded Armenia in late August of 2 AD. He encountered no serious opposition as there were only a few revolts he had to suppress as a result of the nationalist party.

On 9 September, Abbadon, the leader of the rebellion, invited Gaius into the fortress to speak with him. It proved to be a trick, and Gaius was wounded in the confrontation. He had to be carried away by his outraged lieutenants. His forces promptly laid siege to the city and captured the fortress after intense fighting. At first the wound did not seem serious and he was able to complete the pacification of Armenia, a relatively easy task.

By the next year, 3 AD, he was entirely prostrated by the effects of his wound, had resigned his command, and withdrawn to Syria from where he informed Augustus that he had no further desire to take part in public life. The eastern campaign had proven severe: his health was weak and his mental balance unstable. At the age of twenty-three, the young man whom the Emperor considered his heir and sole hope of prosperity had abandoned his prospects of reputation and power in a wild fit of despair and fear. Augustus did his best to cheer him up and convince him to return to Italy. It was in vain; Gaius died in Limyra on 21 February 4 AD.

== Post mortem ==
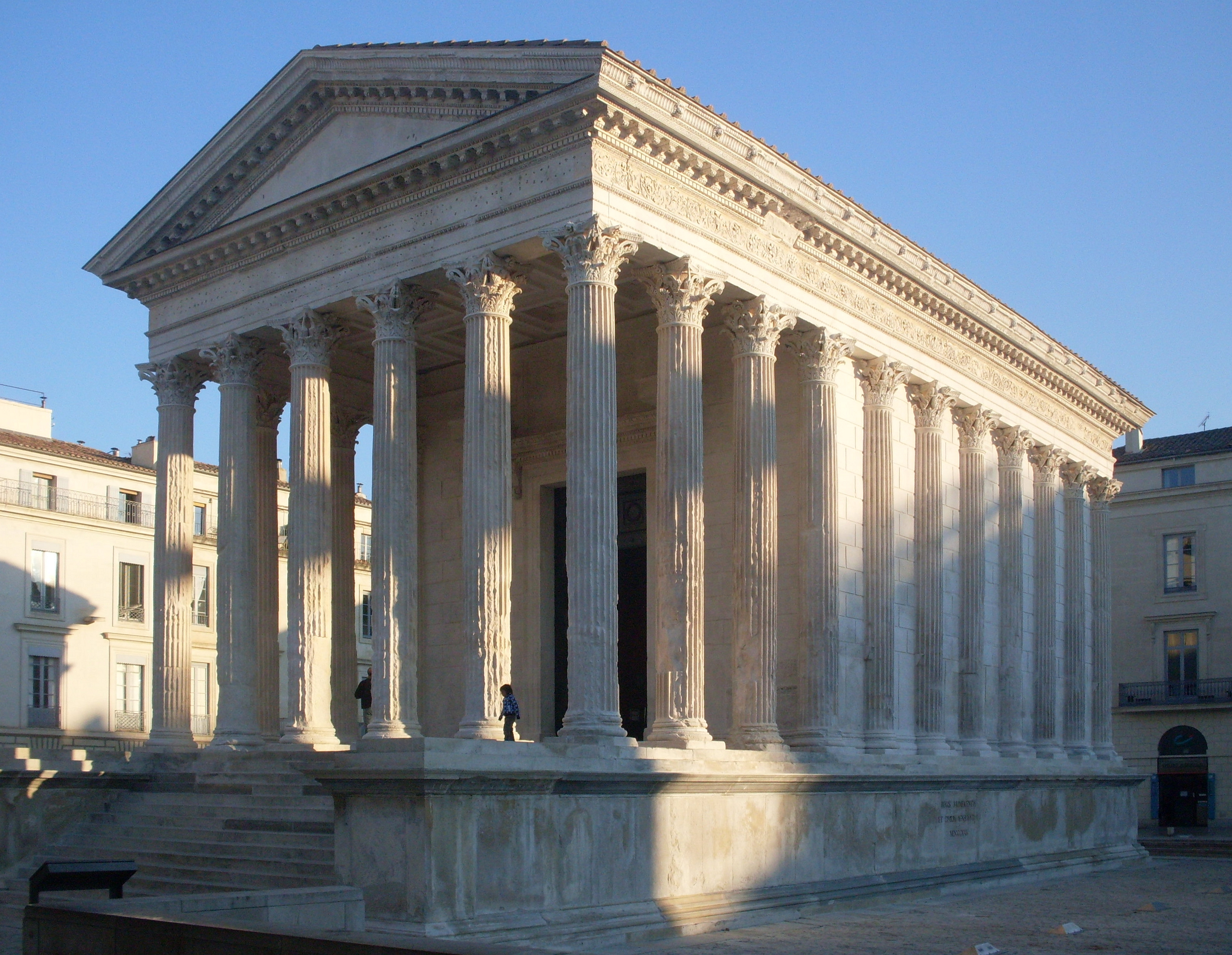
The Maison Carrée (French: "square house") was dedicated in Nemausus to Gaius and Lucius.

While Gaius was in Armenia, his brother Lucius had been sent by Augustus to complete his military training in Spain. While there, he fell ill and died on 20 August 2 AD in Massalia, Gaul. In the span of 18 months, the planned future of Rome was shaken. The deaths of both Gaius and Lucius, the Emperor's two most favoured heirs, led Augustus to adopt his stepson Tiberius and his sole remaining grandson Postumus as his new heirs on 26 June 4 AD.

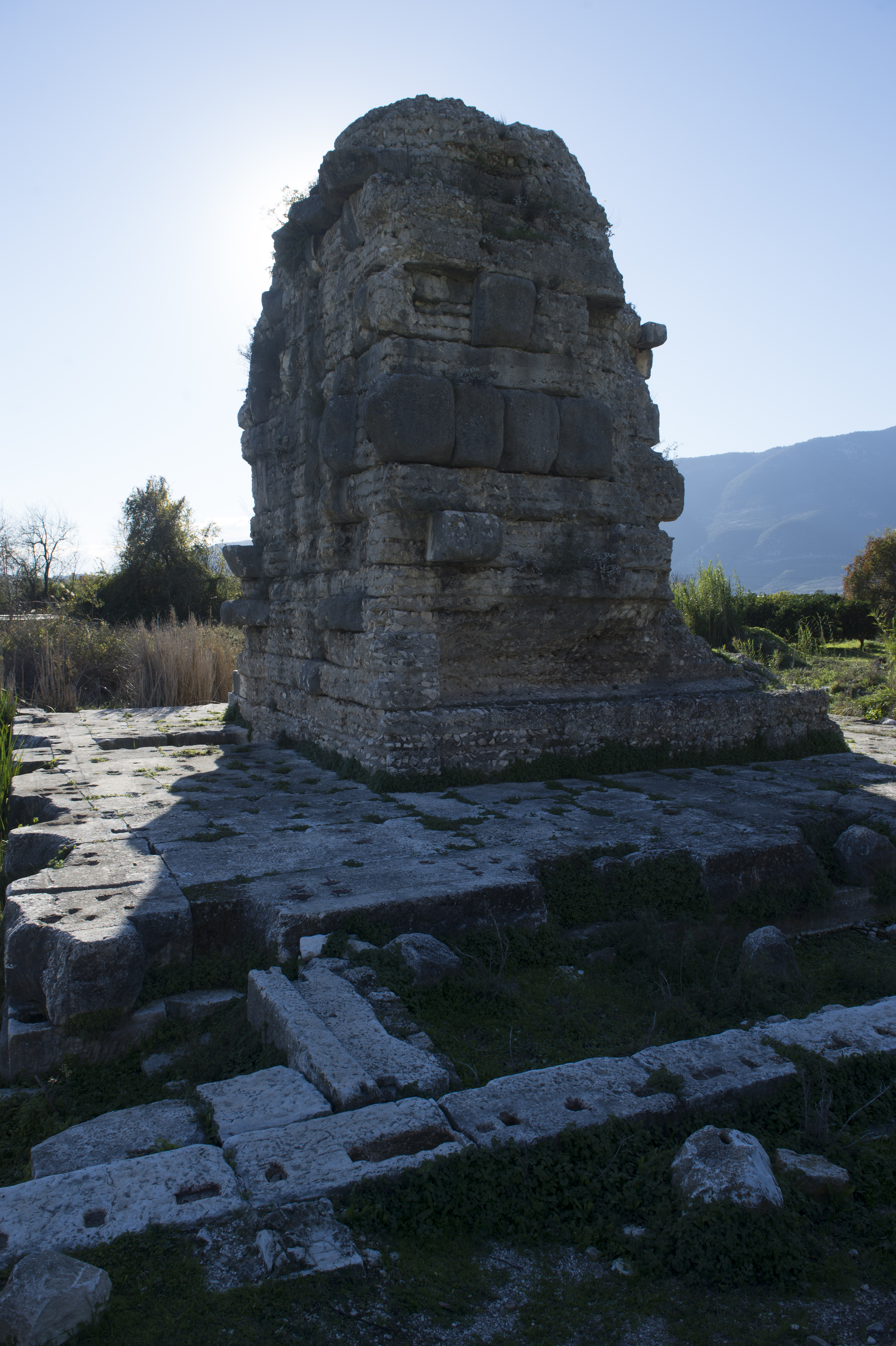
Limyra Cenotaph of Gaius Caesar

Many honors were heaped upon Gaius by citizens and city officials of the Empire, including Colonia Obsequens Iulia Pisana (Pisa), where it was decreed that proper rites must be observed by matrons to lament his passing. Temples, public baths, and shops shut their doors as women wept inconsolably. To commemorate his brief life, a cenotaph was erected on the Limyrus River at Limyra in Lycia. Posthumously, the Senate voted honours for the young Caesars, and arranged for the golden spears and shields the boys had received on achieving the age of military service to be hung in the Senate House. The caskets containing their ashes were stored in the Mausoleum of Augustus alongside those of their father Agrippa and other members of the imperial family.

Both Tacitus and Cassius Dio suggested foul play may have been involved in the death of Gaius and Lucius and that Gaius's step grandmother Livia may have had a hand in their deaths. Livia's presumed motive may have been to orchestrate the accession of her own son Tiberius as heir to Augustus.

== Ancestry ==
Ancestry of Gaius Caesar

4. Lucius Vipsanius Agrippa
2. Marcus Vipsanius Agrippa
1. Gaius Caesar
24. Gaius Octavius
12. Gaius Octavius
6. Augustus
26. Marcus Atius Balbus
13. Atia
27. Julia Minor
3. Julia the Elder
14. Lucius Scribonius Libo
7. Scribonia
15. Sentia

== See also ==
- Julio-Claudian family tree

== Footnotes ==
Political offices
Preceded by Cossus Cornelius Lentulus; Lucius Calpurnius Piso	Roman consul 1 AD; With: Lucius Aemilius Paullus; Marcus Herennius Picens	Succeeded by Publius Vinicius; Publius Alfenus Varus
