= Marcellus (nephew of Augustus) =

Nephew of Roman emperor Augustus (42–23 BC)

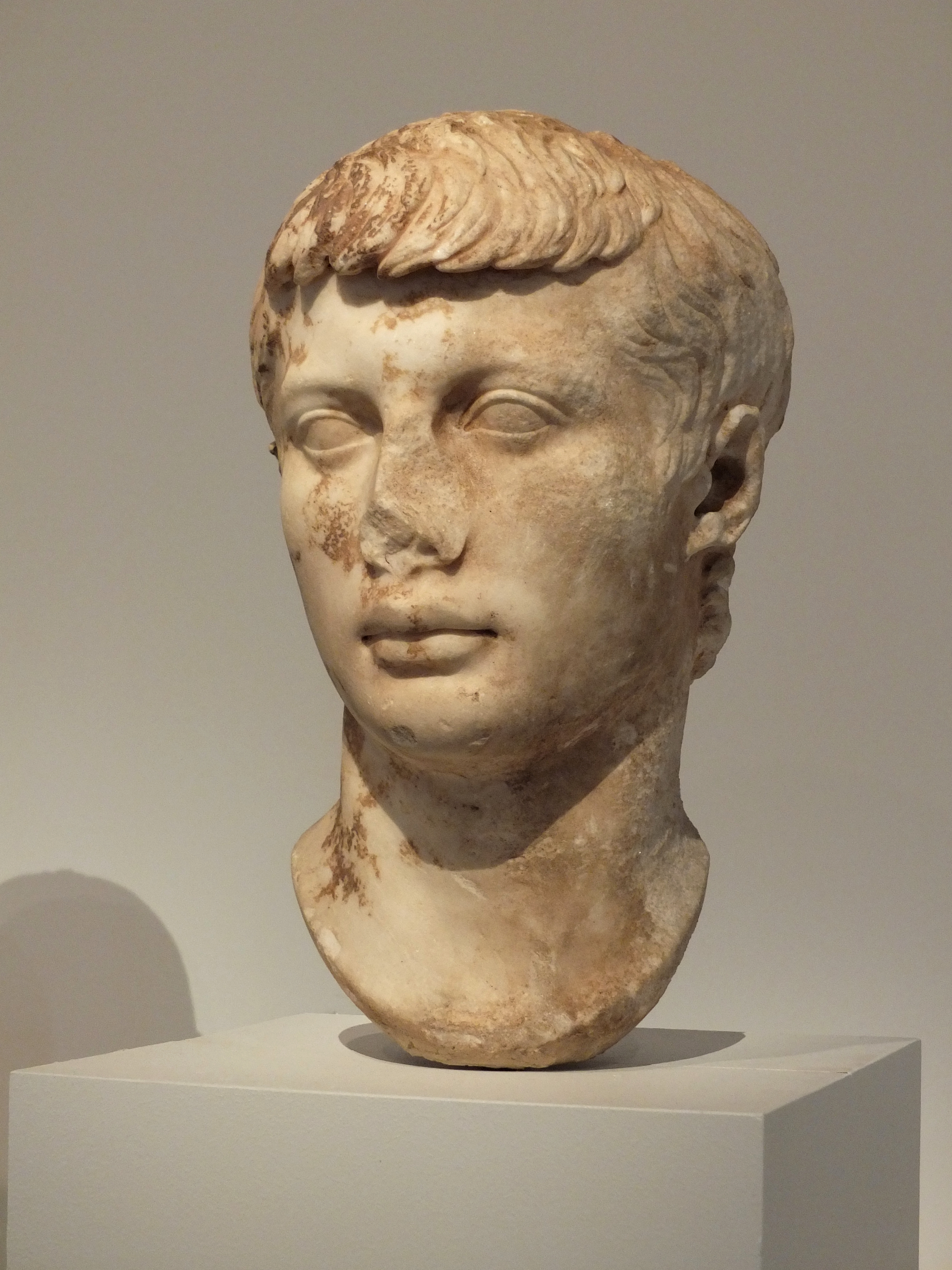
- Bust of Marcellus, marble from Paros, dated around 25–20 BC
- Born: 42 BC; Rome, Italy, Roman Republic
- Died: 23 BC (aged 19); Baiae, Italy, Roman Empire
- Burial place: Mausoleum of Augustus
- Other name: Marcus Claudius Marcellus
- Spouse: Julia the Elder
- Parents: Gaius Claudius Marcellus (father); Octavia the Younger (mother)
- Family: Julio-Claudian

Marcus Claudius Marcellus (42–23 BC) was the eldest son of Gaius Claudius Marcellus and Octavia the Younger, sister of Augustus (then known as Octavian). He was Augustus' nephew and closest male relative, and began to enjoy an accelerated political career as a result. He was educated with his cousin Tiberius and traveled with him to Hispania where they served under Augustus in the Cantabrian Wars. In 25 BC he returned to Rome where he married his cousin Julia, who was the emperor's daughter. Marcellus and Augustus' general Marcus Vipsanius Agrippa were the two popular choices as heir to the empire. According to Suetonius, this put Agrippa at odds with Marcellus, and is the reason why Agrippa traveled away from Rome to Mytilene in 23 BC.

That year, an illness was spreading in Rome which afflicted both Augustus and Marcellus. Augustus caught it earlier in the year, while Marcellus caught it later, after the emperor had already recovered. The illness proved fatal and killed Marcellus at Baiae, in Campania, Italy. He would be the first member of the imperial family whose ashes were placed in the Mausoleum of Augustus. Despite dying at a young age, Marcellus' position led to his celebration by Sextus Propertius, as well as by Virgil in the Aeneid.

== Background ==
Marcellus was born into the Claudii Marcelli, a plebeian branch of the gens Claudia in 42 BC, the son of Gaius Claudius Marcellus and Octavia the Younger. He had two full sisters named Claudia Marcella the Elder and Claudia Marcella the Younger as well as two younger maternal half-sisters named Antonia the Elder and Antonia the Younger.

His mother was the great-niece of Julius Caesar and the sister of Octavian. Octavian would later become the first emperor of Rome and assume the name "Augustus". His father was consul in 50 BC and, despite his initial loyalty to Pompey, sided with Caesar during Caesar's Civil War in 49 BC. After his father's death in 40 BC his mother was married to Marc Antony when Antony and her brother were the most powerful men in the Roman world.

Sextus Propertius and Virgil connect Marcellus to his famous ancestor Marcus Claudius Marcellus, a famous general who fought in the Second Punic War.

== Early life ==
He was betrothed to Pompeia, the daughter of Sextus Pompey, in 39 BC at the peace of Misenum where Octavian and Sextus Pompey agreed to a truce. Marcellus never married Pompeia and she fled with her mother and father to Anatolia in 36 BC.

Not much is known about his education except that he was taught philosophy by Nestor the Stoic alongside his cousin Tiberius who had moved into Octavia's house following the death of his father Tiberius Claudius Nero in 33 BC. He may also have received some education by Athenaeus Mechanicus, who was a Peripatetic philosopher.

At the conclusion of the War of Actium, Antony was defeated by Octavian at the Battle of Actium in September 31 BC, for which Octavian was awarded a triple triumph. The triumph was held in Rome during which his chariot was preceded by Tiberius and Marcellus. Tiberius rode on the trace-horse to the left while Marcellus rode on the more honorable trace-horse to the right, though Tiberius led the older boys in the Lusus Troiae ("Trojan games"). As part of the performances held at the Circus Maximus Cleopatra Selene II and her younger brother, both fruit of the relationship of his father Mark Antony with queen Cleopatra, were held captive and had to dress up in a moon costume and golden chains. Octavian also had money distributed to the children of Rome in Marcellus' name.

== Career ==
Marcellus and Tiberius either accompanied or followed Augustus to Hispania during his campaigns against the Cantabri and Astures in the Cantabrian Wars. During the second campaign in 25 BC, Marcellus and Tiberius were military tribunes with special aedile powers. After the second campaign, Augustus discharged some of his soldiers and allowed them to found the city of Emerita Augusta in Lusitania (now Mérida, Spain). For the soldiers still of military age, he held games under the direction of Marcellus and Tiberius. The campaigns were a way of introducing Marcellus and Tiberius to military life and, more importantly, to the soldiery.

He and Tiberius then returned to Rome, probably in the spring of 25 BC. His political career saw acceleration by Augustus, and he was thought to be Augustus' preferred successor by many contemporaries. He was married to his cousin Julia the Elder, who was Augustus' only daughter. The following year (24 BC) he was awarded extraordinary privileges by the Senate:

- He was made equal in rank to ex-praetors
- He was given the right to stand for the aedileship in 23 BC (Note: Barbara Levick says he was given the right to stand for the aedileship of 23 BC (Levick 2003, p. 8), but Cassius Dio says Marcellus was immediately made aedile and Tiberius was made quaestor (Cassius Dio LVIII, 26).)
- He was given the right to become consul ten years before the legal age

Tacitus writes that Marcellus was a member of the college of pontiffs and a curule aedile.

=== A question of succession ===
Augustus fell dangerously ill in 23 BC and did not expect to recover. The model of later imperial succession suggested that the closest male relative would succeed, despite the fact that Marcellus had held no office and lacked military experience. His marriage to Augustus' daughter seemed to be a strong indicator, but Augustus seems to have planned his succession so that the strongest and most experienced member of his family would succeed. He gave his signet ring to his lifelong friend and general Marcus Vipsanius Agrippa, a sign that Agrippa would succeed him if he were to die. This probably angered Marcellus, who expected to be his heir, though Augustus may have meant for Agrippa to run the empire until Marcellus became more experienced leading armies.

The consequences of giving the ring to Agrippa is not entirely clear and it began much political speculation in Rome. It was an indication that Rome would remain under Caesarian control even after the death of Augustus. Regardless, the emperor was soon restored to health by an Antonius Musa and began grooming Marcellus for the principate. Agrippa left Rome to supervise the eastern provinces as the political climate in Rome became heated. Agrippa's absence from Rome served to protect him from personal attacks and to remove some of the perceived repression from republican-minded senators. Suetonius reports that Agrippa left Rome because of Augustus' preference for Marcellus.

As the political drama developed in Rome, Marcellus had developed a fever. Musa treated his illness the same way he had treated Augustus, using cold baths, but it was to no avail, and Marcellus died. (Note: Augustus was ruling as the first among equals (princeps), not as an outright monarch. The public mourning of Marcellus was seen as the emergence of a royal dynasty, one in which Marcellus was a fallen prince (Alston 2015, p. 252).)

== Post mortem ==
He was cremated and his ashes were the first to be interred in the Mausoleum of Augustus on the Campus Martius beside the river Tiber. The Mausoleum became the family tomb for Rome's first monarchic family in five centuries. Livia was suspected of having a hand in his death, despite the fact that there was a plague in Rome that claimed many lives. Dio reports that his contemporaries blamed her because Marcellus was favored above her son Tiberius.

The new theater that was under construction at the foot of the Capitoline Hill was named the Theater of Marcellus by Augustus in his honor. The Theater is an impressive structure even today after centuries of reuse.

His mother Octavia had a library dedicated to him in the Porticus Octaviae, which would later be organized by Gaius Maecenas Melissus, former slave of the famous Maecenas.

Sextus Propertius wrote an epikedion for Marcellus (3.18) in which he criticizes Baiae, the place of his death, and elevates Marcellus to the level of Julius Caesar and his famous (alleged) ancestor Marcus Claudius Marcellus who fought in the Second Punic War.

Virgil published Aeneid, his great epic of the foundation of Rome, four or five years after the death of Marcellus. In book six, the protagonist Aeneas is taken to the Underworld in one of the prophecy scenes where he encounters the spirit of Marcellus. It includes a narrative of the funeral of Marcellus on the Campus Martius. Virgil writes he was to have been the greatest of Romans, but even the gods were jealous and took Marcellus from the Roman people.

== Cultural depictions ==
Due to his close relation to the leading member of Roman politics, he is depicted in many works of art. The most notable of which include:

- Virgil reading the Aeneid to Augustus and Octavia (1787), a painting by Jean-Joseph Taillasson. (Note: Though the work does not depict him directly, it is of his mother fainting after hearing Virgil recite lines referencing Marcellus' youthful virtues in book six of his Aeneid (Woolf 2003, p. 16).)
- Virgil Reading the Aeneid to Augustus and Octavia (1788), a painting by Angelica Kauffman
- Virgil reading The Aeneid before Augustus, Livia and Octavia (1812), a painting by Jean-Auguste-Dominique Ingres
- I, Claudius (1934), a historical novel by classicist Robert Graves.
- I, Claudius (1976), a television series by Jack Pulman. He is played by Christopher Guard.
- Domina (2021), created and written by Simon Burke for Sky Atlantic. He is played by Finn Bennett.

== Ancestry ==
Ancestry of Gaius Claudius Marcellus

16. Marcus Claudius Marcellus
8. Marcus Claudius Marcellus
4. Gaius Claudius Marcellus
2. Gaius Claudius Marcellus
5. Junia
1. Marcellus
24. Gaius Octavius
12. Gaius Octavius
6. Gaius Octavius
3. Octavia the Younger
28. Marcus Atius Balbus
14. Marcus Atius Balbus
29. Pompeia
7. Atia
30. Gaius Julius Caesar
15. Julia the Younger
31. Aurelia

== Bibliography ==
=== Primary sources ===
- Cassius Dio, Roman History Book 53, English translation
- Suetonius, Lives of the Twelve Caesars, Life of Augustus, Latin text with English translation
- Suetonius, Lives of the Twelve Caesars, Life of Tiberius, Latin text with English translation
- Tacitus, Annals, I, English translation

=== Secondary sources ===
- Alston, Richard (2015), Rome's Revolution: Death of the Republic and Birth of the Empire, Oxford University Press, ISBN 9780190231606
- Cairns, Francis (2006), Sextus Propertius: The Augustan Elegist, Cambridge University Press, ISBN 9780521864572
- Dunstan, William E. (2010), Ancient Rome, Rowman & Littlefield Publishers, ISBN 9780742568341
- Gurval, Robert Alan (1998), Actium and Augustus: The Politics and Emotions of Civil War, University of Michigan Press, ISBN 9780472084890
- Levick, Barbara (2003), Tiberius the Politician, Routledge, ISBN 9781134603787
- Newcomb, Horace (1997), Encyclopedia of Television, Routledge, ISBN 978-0-203-93734-1
- Richardson, J. S. (2012), Augustan Rome 44 BC to AD 14: The Restoration of the Republic and the Establishment of the Empire, Edinburgh University Press, ISBN 9780748655335
- Southern, Patricia (2013), Augustus, Routledge, ISBN 9781134589562
- Swan, Michael Peter (2004), The Augustan Succession: An Historical Commentary on Cassius Dio's Roman History, Oxford University Press, ISBN 0-19-516774-0
- Syme, Ronald (1989), The Augustan Aristocracy, Clarendon Press, ISBN 9780198147312
- Wood, Susan E. (2000), Imperial Women: A Study in Public Images, 40 B.c. - A.d. 68, BRILL, ISBN 9789004119697
- Woolf, Greg (2003), The Cambridge Illustrated History of the Roman World, Cambridge University Press, ISBN 9780521827751
- This article incorporates text from a publication now in the public domain: Smith, William, ed. (1873). "Pompeia". Dictionary of Greek and Roman Biography and Mythology. Vol. 3. p. 473.
