= Julia the Elder =

Daughter of Augustus (39 BC – AD 14)

- Bust of Julia the Elder (Musée Saint-Raymond)
- Born: 30 October 39 BC; Rome, Italy, Roman Republic
- Died: AD 14 (aged 52); Rhegium, Italy, Roman Empire
- Spouses: Marcellus (25 BC–September 23 BC; his death); Marcus Vipsanius Agrippa (21 BC–12 BC; his death); Tiberius (11 BC–2 BC; divorced)
- Issue: Gaius Caesar (Agrippa); Julia the Younger (Agrippa); Lucius Caesar (Agrippa); Agrippina the Elder (Agrippa); Agrippa Postumus (Agrippa); Tiberillus (Tiberius)
- Dynasty: Julio-Claudian
- Father: Augustus
- Mother: Scribonia

Julia the Elder (30 October 39 BC – AD 14), known to her contemporaries as Julia Caesaris filia or Julia Augusti filia (Classical Latin: IVLIA•CAESARIS•FILIA or IVLIA•AVGVSTI•FILIA), was the daughter and only surviving biological child of Augustus, the first Roman emperor, and his second wife, Scribonia. Julia was also stepsister and second wife of the Emperor Tiberius; maternal grandmother of the Emperor Caligula and the Empress Agrippina the Younger; grandmother-in-law of the Emperor Claudius; and maternal great-grandmother of the Emperor Nero. Her epithet "the Elder" distinguishes her from her daughter, Julia the Younger.

== Life ==
=== Early life ===
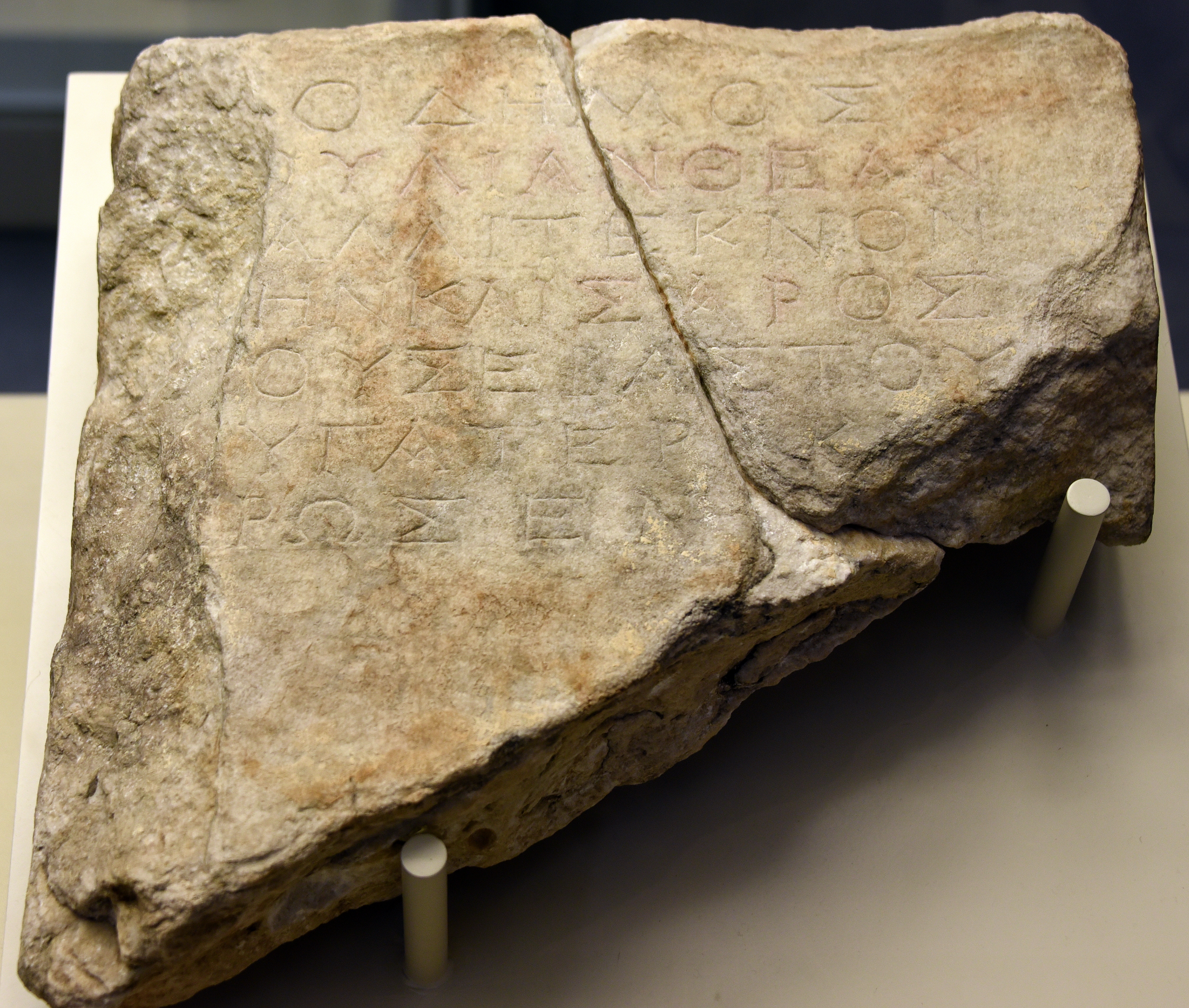
Inscribed dedication to Julia, daughter of Augustus, Roman, set up about 15–12 BC. From the sanctuary of Athena at Priene, western Asia Minor. British Museum

At the time of Julia's birth, 39 BC, Augustus had not yet received the title "Augustus" and was known as "Gaius Julius Caesar Divi Filius", though historians refer to him as "Octavian" until 27 BC, when Julia was 11. Octavian divorced Julia's mother on the day of her birth and took Julia from her soon thereafter. Octavian, in accordance with Roman custom, claimed complete parental control over her. She was sent to live with her stepmother Livia and when she was old enough learned how to be an aristocrat. Her education appears to have been strict and somewhat old-fashioned. Thus, in addition to her studies, according to Suetonius, she was taught spinning and weaving. Macrobius mentions "her love of literature and considerable culture, a thing easy to come by in that household". Julia remained the only living biological child of Octavian, after her half-sibling born by Livia died as result of preterm birth.

Julia's social life was severely controlled, and she was allowed to talk only to people whom her father had vetted. However, Octavian had a great affection for his daughter and made sure she had the best teachers available. Macrobius preserves a remark of Augustus: "There are two wayward daughters that I have to put up with: the Roman commonwealth and Julia."

In 37 BC, during Julia's early childhood, Octavian's friends Gaius Maecenas and Marcus Vipsanius Agrippa concluded an agreement with Octavian's great rival Mark Antony. It was sealed with an engagement: Antony's ten-year-old son Marcus Antonius Antyllus was to marry Julia, then two years old. This marriage never took place, since the peace arrangements collapsed five years later. In 30 BC, victory in the War of Actium made Octavian sole ruler of the Roman Empire.

=== First marriage ===
As with most aristocratic Roman women of the period, expectations of Julia focused on marriage and on the resulting family alliances. Moreover, Augustus desired a male issue; as his only living child, Julia's duty would be to provide her father with grandsons whom he could adopt as his heirs.

In 25 BC, at the age of fourteen, Julia married her first cousin Marcellus, the son of her father's sister Octavia, who was some three years older than she. Augustus himself was not present for the wedding as he was fighting a war in Spain and had fallen ill. Instead, he commissioned Agrippa to preside over the ceremony and hold the festival in his absence.

The decision to marry Marcellus to Julia, and then Augustus's choice to raise Marcellus to the pontificate and curule aedileship, was perceived to be an indication that he would be Augustus's successor in power, despite his youth. This put him at odds with Agrippa, who, people believed, would oppose Marcellus' accession to power; the apparent preference for Marcellus is allegedly the catalyst that led Agrippa to withdraw to Mytilene, Greece.

However, Marcellus died in September 23 BC, when Julia was sixteen. The union produced no children.

=== Marriage to Agrippa ===
In 21 BC, having now reached the age of 18, Julia married Agrippa, a man from a modest family who had risen to become Augustus's most trusted general and friend. This step is said to have been taken partly on the advice of Maecenas, who in counseling Augustus remarked: "You have made him so great that he must either become your son-in-law or be slain." Agrippa was nearly 25 years her elder; it was a typical arranged marriage, with Julia functioning as a pawn in her father's dynastic plans. There is from this period the report of an infidelity with one Sempronius Gracchus, with whom Julia allegedly had a lasting liaison (Tacitus describes him as "a persistent paramour"). This was the first of a series of alleged adulteries. According to Suetonius, Julia's marital status did not prevent her from conceiving a passion for Augustus's stepson, and thus her stepbrother, Tiberius, so it was widely rumoured.

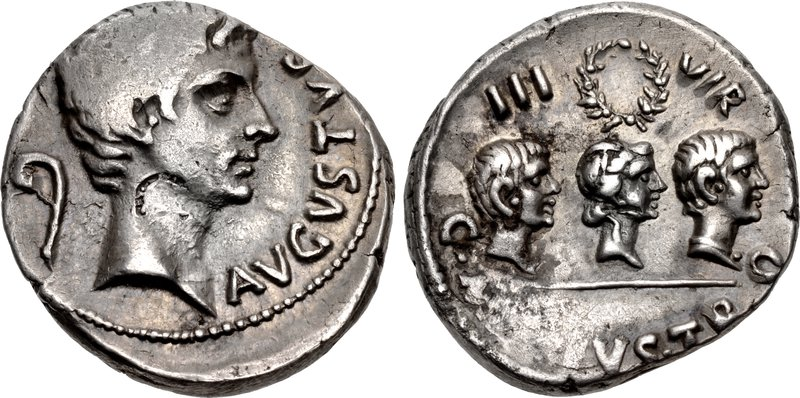
Julia, flanked by her sons Lucius and Gaius on the reverse of the denarius of Augustus, minted in 13 BC (RIC I 404)

The newlyweds lived in a villa in Rome that has since been excavated near the modern Farnesina in Trastevere. Agrippa and Julia's marriage resulted in five children: Gaius Caesar, Julia the Younger, Lucius Caesar, Agrippina the Elder (mother of Caligula), and Agrippa Postumus (a posthumous son). From June 20 BC to the spring of 18 BC, Agrippa was governor of Gaul, and it is likely that Julia followed him across the Alps. Shortly after their arrival, their first child Gaius was born, and in 19 BC, Julia gave birth to Vipsania Julia. After their return to Italy, a third child followed: a son named Lucius. In 17 BC, Augustus adopted the newborn Lucius and the three-year-old Gaius. He took care of their education personally. Although Agrippa died in 12 BC, Augustus did not adopt the third brother, Marcus Vipsanius Agrippa Postumus, until AD 4, after the exile of Julia – and after the deaths of both Gaius and Lucius.

Nicolaus and Josephus mention that during Julia's marriage to Agrippa, she travelled to meet Agrippa where he was campaigning. She was caught up in a flash flood in Ilium (Troy), and almost drowned. Agrippa was furious, and in his anger he fined the locals 100,000 drachmae. The fine was a heavy blow but no one would face Agrippa to request an appeal. Only after Herod, king of Judaea, went to Agrippa to request a pardon did he withdraw the fine. In the spring of 16 BC, Agrippa and Julia started a tour through the eastern provinces, where they visited Herod. In October 14 BC, the couple traveled to Athens, where Julia gave birth to her fourth child, Agrippina. (Note: According to Suetonius, Caligula – the son of Julia's daughter Agrippina and Tiberius's nephew Germanicus – would claim after his own ascension that his mother Agrippina was the product of an incestuous union between Julia and Augustus. The reason for this is allegedly because he did not wish to be thought of as the grandson of Agrippa due to his humble origins. However, the existence of coins and inscriptions dating from Caligula's reign that clearly identify Agrippina as Agrippa's daughter suggests this account is apocryphal. Barrett considered it to be a joke made in poor taste, rather than outright dismiss it as false.)

After the winter, the family returned to Italy. Julia quickly became pregnant again, but her husband died suddenly in March 12 BC in Campania at the age of 51. He was buried in the Mausoleum of Augustus. Julia named the posthumous son Marcus in his honor. He was to be known as Agrippa Postumus. Immediately after the boy was born, and while Julia was still in mourning, Augustus had her betrothed and then remarried to Tiberius, her stepbrother.

=== Marriage to Tiberius ===
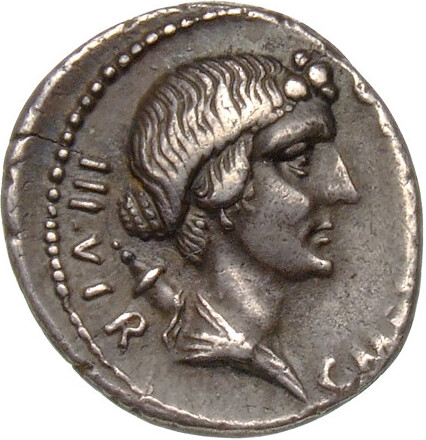
Denarius depicting the goddess Diana, likely represented as Julia.

After the death of Agrippa, Augustus sought to promote his step-son Tiberius, believing that this would best serve his own dynastic interests. Tiberius married Julia (11 BC), but first had to divorce Vipsania Agrippina (daughter from a previous marriage of Agrippa), the woman he dearly loved. Suetonius alleges that Tiberius had a low opinion of Julia's character, while Tacitus claims that she disdained Tiberius as an unequal match and even sent his father a letter, written by Sempronius Gracchus, denouncing him. The marriage was difficult and the couple unhappy almost from the start, made worse when the only child delivered at term from Julia died in infancy. By 6 BC, when Tiberius departed for Rhodes, if not earlier, the couple had lived separately.

=== Scandal ===
Because Augustus was her legitimate father, having married her mother with conubium, Augustus had Patria Potestas over her. Julia's marriages to Marcellus, Agrippa and Tiberius were not manus marriages, meaning that she did not transfer into their power, she remained under the power of Augustus for all her life. We know that because Julia continued to receive a peculium, a kind of allowance, from Augustus, and was not absorbed into Agrippa's domus (Marcellus and Tiberius were both under the power of Augustus).

As the daughter of Augustus, mother (now legally the sister) of two of his heirs (Lucius and Gaius) and wife of another (Tiberius), Julia held a high status position in the family as the person who had secured the start of Augustus' intended agnate, or blood related dynasty. In 2 BC she was arrested for adultery and treason on the grounds of adultery or impudicitia in the rostra; Augustus sent her a letter in Tiberius's name declaring the marriage null and void. (Tiberius was at this time on the island of Rhodes and unable to respond quickly.) According to Suetonius, Augustus announced her exile to the senate house via letter, too embarrassed to announce it in person. He also asserted in public that she had been plotting against his own life. At the time Augustus had been passing legislation to promote 'acceptable' marriages, ie. marriages within acceptable social class boundaries, by using a system of punishments and rewards, and made adultery a criminal offence, collectively known as the Leges Iuliae, and the lex Papia Poppaea, so Augustus had to act. Several of Julia's supposed lovers were exiled, most notably Sempronius Gracchus, while Iullus Antonius (son of Mark Antony and Fulvia) was forced to commit suicide. Some has suggested that This may have been a political statement, due to the tradition of civic rebellion occurring at the rostra, the epicenter of public life in Rome, since as early as the twelve tables, nocturnal meetings within the city were banned to avoid political uprisings. Others have suggested that Julia's alleged paramours were members of her city companions, who wished to remove Tiberius from favour and replace him with Iullus Antonius. This would explain the letter, written by Gracchus, asking Augustus to allow Julia to divorce Tiberius.

=== Exile ===
Reluctant to execute her, Augustus decided instead to confine Julia on Pandateria, an island that measures less than 1.75 square kilometres (0.68 sq mi), with no men in sight and forbidden even to drink wine. Her mother, Scribonia, accompanied her into exile. She was allowed no visitor unless her father had given permission and had been informed of the stature, complexion, and even of any marks or scars upon his body.

Five years after her initial exile, around AD 4, Julia was moved to Rhegium on the mainland and Augustus appears to have granted her a peculium (property), a yearly income and permission to walk about the town. Despite these concessions, Augustus never forgave her nor ever allowed her to return to Rome. This choice appears to have been unpopular with the Roman people, who petitioned several times for her to be recalled. Julia's exile cast a long shadow over Augustus's remaining years. In AD 6 Julia's youngest son, Agrippa Postumus, was exiled for his growing unruliness. Then in AD 8 her elder daughter, Julia the Younger, was exiled to Tremirus, likewise charged with adultery; it may also have been related to the attempted revolt by her husband Lucius Aemilius Paullus and one Plautius Rufus. It is said that at any mention of Julia or her two disgraced children, Augustus would remark of them: "If only I had never married, or had died childless", slightly misquoting Hector in the Iliad. There is mention of at least one suppressed plot to take her from captivity; one Lucius Audasius and one Asinius Epicadus had planned to forcibly take her and her son Agrippa Postumus from where they were held and to the armies, presumably to stage a coup against Augustus.

On Augustus's death in AD 14 Tiberius ascended to the Principate. Despite having shown some sympathy towards Julia when she was initially exiled, he instead enforced harsher conditions upon her. He removed her dowry and yearly income, citing that Augustus had failed to make provisions for them in his will, and thus left her destitute. Furthermore he denied her permission to leave her house or receive visitors.

=== Death and aftermath ===
Julia died in AD 14, some time after Augustus's death. While it is generally agreed by contemporary historians that it was as a result of Tiberius's actions against her, the circumstances of her death are obscure. Dio Cassius indicates Tiberius had a direct hand in her death by imprisoning her until she died either from debility or starvation. Tacitus remarks that upon learning Postumus had been murdered, she succumbed to despair and her health slowly declined. Augustus had explicitly given instructions in his will that she should not be buried in his Mausoleum of Augustus.

Simultaneously, her alleged paramour Sempronius Gracchus, who had endured 14 years of exile on Cercina (Kerkenna) off the African coast, was executed either at Tiberius' instigation or on the independent initiative of L. Nonius Asprenas, proconsul of Africa.

Her daughter Julia died in AD 28, after 20 years of exile; like her mother, the younger Julia was forbidden by Augustus's will to be buried in his tomb.

== Cultural depictions ==
Among later writers, Julia is depicted with promiscuous, near sexually transgressive, conduct. Seneca the Younger, born only 2 years after the exile refers to "adulterers admitted in droves"; Marcus Velleius Paterculus, born 16 years after the event (2.100) describes her as "tainted by luxury or lust", listing among her lovers Iullus Antonius, Quintius Crispinus, Appius Claudius, Sempronius Gracchus, and Cornelius Scipio. Pliny the Elder, born 21 years after Julia's exile calls her an "exemplum licentiae" (NH 21.9). Dio Cassius, born over a century after the event, mentions "revels and drinking parties by night in the Forum and even upon the Rostra" (Roman History 55.10). Seneca (De Beneficiis 6.32) tells us that the Rostra was the place where "her father had proposed a law against adultery", and yet now she had chosen the place for her "debaucheries". Julia is also noted in Seneca and Pliny's works to have crowned the statue of Marsyas, a satyr typically associated with Bacchus, arrogance and sexuality, who lost a music competition with Apollo, who then Augustus may have been associated with. Seneca mentions possible prostitution: "...she[Julia] had been accessible to scores of paramours, that in nocturnal revels she had roamed about the city...laying aside the role of adulteress, there sold her favours, and sought the right to every indulgence with even an unknown paramour".

Macrobius writes in the 4th century CE, in his play Saturnalia on Julia, using her as an opposition piece to Livia and Augustus in a satirical discussion on the nature of pleasure, providing details of her witticisms and personality. Among the sassy ripostes he attributes to her is a retort to people's surprise that her children all resembled Agrippa – "I take on a passenger only when the ship's hold is full." On her character, he writes that Julia was extensively celebrated for her amiable, empathetic nature and studiousness despite her profligacy: "[S]he was abusing her standing as Fortune's darling, and her father's, though in other respects she gained a great deal of credit for her love of literature and extensive learning... and her kindness, fellow-feeling, and lack of cruelty."

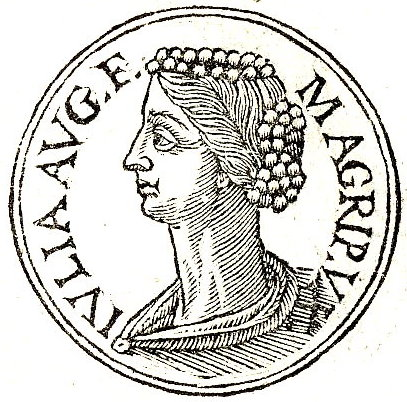
Julia, from Guillaume Rouillé's Promptuarii Iconum Insigniorum

== Marriages and births ==
- 25 BC, Marcus Claudius Marcellus, until his death in September 23 BC. No children.
- 21 BC, Marcus Vipsanius Agrippa, until his death in 12 BC. Their children:
  - Gaius Caesar in 20 BC
  - Vipsania Julia (known as Julia the Younger) in c. 19 BC.
  - Lucius Caesar in 17 BC
  - Vipsania Julia Agrippina (known as Agrippina the Elder) in 14 BC (mother of Emperor Caligula)
  - Agrippa Postumus in 12 BC (posthumously after Agrippa's death).
- 11 BC, Julia marries her stepbrother Tiberius. Their child:
  - Infant son, (dubbed "Tiberillus" by modern historians), died in infancy.

== Ancestry ==
Ancestors of Julia the Elder

16. Gaius Octavius
8. Gaius Octavius
4. Gaius Octavius
2. Augustus
20. Marcus Atius Balbus
10. Marcus Atius Balbus
21. Pompeia
5. Atia
22. Gaius Julius Caesar
11. Julia Minor
23. Aurelia Cotta
1. Julia the Elder
6. Lucius Scribonius Libo
3. Scribonia
7. Sentia

== See also ==
- Julio-Claudian family tree
- Lex Julia
- Lex Papia Poppaea
- Scandal
