= Gian Francesco Gamurrini =

Italian archeologist, historian, bibliophile and connoisseur

Gian Francesco Gamurrini (18 May 1835, Arezzo – 17 March 1923, Arezzo) was an Italian archeologist, historian, bibliophile and connoisseur.

== Works ==
Gamurrini, from an aristocratic Aretine family, found his interest in history initially piqued when he was selected by lot, at the age of 25, Rector of the Fraternità dei Laici, an ancient confraternity of Arezzo, whose history he published at the end of his term of office. Though he had studied in Perugia, the library of the Fraternità was his true school, sparking his interests in numismatics and Etruscan studies, with which he was to make his name. Emil Hübner, who was in the Arezzo library collecting inscriptions for Corpus Inscriptionum Latinarum (edited by Theodor Mommsen) introduced him to Wilhelm Henzen, and together they encouraged him to publish his first work, Le iscrizioni degli antichi vasi fittili aretini (1859). He began to collect Etruscan and Roman inscriptions in the area of Arezzo, a project which he never brought to publishable form, and explored Etruscan and Roman sites in Central Italy, project that was to bear fruit years later in his archaeological map of Central Italy.

In 1865 he agitated for the protection of the artistic patrimony of Arezzo, as monasteries were being dissolved and unneeded churches secularized. In his first effort he saved from dismemberment the great altar of Santa Maria della Pieve ad Arezzo, enclosing a painting by Vasari. At this period he met in Rome Francesco Orioli, whose course in Etruscan epigraphy Gamurrini followed attentively. It was Orioli who suggested the fruitful methodology, that of recording the results of his researches by subject. He pursued this schedario Gamurrini for the rest of his life.

In 1867 the minister Michele Coppino appointed him to direct the museums of antiquities in the newly Royal Galleries of Florence. In the eight years he spent in this position he was an advocate for the archeological patrimony that had previously been ignored, vulnerable to furtive sales on the gray market, arriving at a program for the future protection of the cultural patrimony, which he heralded in an article "Delle recenti scoperte e della cattiva fortuna dei monumenti antichi in Etruria" (1868). Collaborating with the Florentine numismatist Carlo Strozzi, he founded a Periodico di Numismatica e Sfragistica per la Storia d’Italia which ended with Strozzi's death in 1875, but not before their combined energies had seen the Museo Etrusco di Firenze (Museum of Etruscan Antiquities), opened in 1871. Gamurrini was deputized to keep vigilance over excavations undertaken in Central Italy, with an eye to enriching the collections of the Museo Etrusco. Under his care, painted vases from the Campana collection and the Sarcophagus of the Amazons found at Tarquinia were added to the museum's collections. Bureaucratic frictions led him to resign his public duties, turn down a seat in archaeology at Bologna and retire to his depleted patrimony at Monte San Savino. There he took up again his contacts in the network of local antiquaries.

Gamurrini was from 1892 the director of the Biblioteca e Museo della Fraternita dei Laici d'Arezzo, where he found the opportunity to compile the Bibliografia dell'Italia antica (1905).

The southeastern Val di Chiana, in the modern Italian province of Arezzo, is well known for its Etruscan remains, particularly in the vicinity of the modern towns of Cortona and Chiusi. Gamurrini was a pioneer in this area: he published his work on the Etruscan site that became the Roman Imperial villa at Ossaia, a small suburb to the southeast of Cortona (Arezzo) in 1881.

In Arezzo, via Gamurrini commemorates him.
