= Marcia (wife of Cato) =

Wife of Cato the Younger

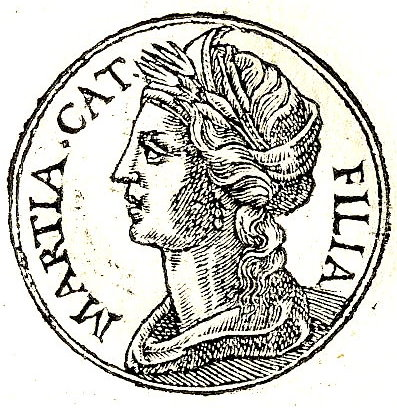
- Marcia from Promptuarii Iconum Insigniorum
- Born: c. 80 BC
- Spouses: Cato the Younger (m. 63 BC; div. 56 BC); Quintus Hortensius (m. 56 BC; d. 50 BC)
- Children: 1 son
- Parent: Lucius Marcius Philippus

William Constable and his sister Winifred represented in the roles of Marcus Porcius Cato and his wife Marcia, painted in Rome by Anton von Maron (1733-1808)

Marcia (also Marzia or Martia; born c. 80 BC) was the second wife of Marcus Porcius Cato Uticensis (Cato the Younger) and the daughter of Lucius Marcius Philippus.

== Biography ==
=== Early life ===
Marcia is believed to have been born around 80 BC to Lucius Marcius Philippus and his first wife. She had two brothers named Lucius Marcius Philippus and Quintus Marcius Philippus. When her father married Atia, she became the step-sister of Octavia Minor and Gaius Octavius Thurinus (the future emperor Augustus).

=== Marriages and children ===
After Cato divorced his first wife Atilia because of rumors about her infidelity, in 63 BC, he married Marcia whom Plutarch described as "a woman of excellent reputation, about whom there was the most abundant talk". Marcia and Cato had two or three children; however, there is controversy about whether or not she was pregnant with this third child at the time of her second marriage to Hortensius. There is no indication that their marriage was unhappy: Plutarch relates that Marcia was concerned for Cato's safety, and Appian says that Cato was extremely fond of Marcia.

Marcia's second marriage, in the year 56 BC, was to the renowned orator and advocate Quintus Hortensius Hortalus, whom Cicero styled as "king of the courts". Hortensius was an admirer and friend of Cato's, and he was eager to be more closely related to Cato and his family. Hortensius' own wife, the daughter of Quintus Lutatius Catulus, had just died and an alliance with Cato seems to be the chief reason for Hortensius, nearing 60 years old, to request to be married to Cato's daughter Porcia, who was only about 20 years old at the time. However, because Porcia was already married to Marcus Calpurnius Bibulus and the age difference was so great, Cato refused to give his consent. Hortensius immediately suggested that he marry Marcia instead because she had already borne Cato his heirs. Due to Hortensius' ardor, Cato acquiesced, but only on the condition that Marcia's father, Lucius Marcius Philippus, approve as well. With Philippus' consent obtained, Cato divorced Marcia, thereby placing her under her father's charge. Hortensius promptly married Marcia, and they had a son. After Hortensius' death in 50 BC, she inherited "every last sesterce of his estate".

At the outbreak of Caesar's Civil War in 49 BC, Marcia and her children moved back into Cato's household. Plutarch asserts that Cato remarried Marcia after Hortensius's death, whereas Appian's histories relate that Cato merely reestablished her in his own household. Either way, this caused a minor scandal, as after Hortensius' death, her return made the household rich.

== Effects of the marriage exchange ==
Many assumptions have been made regarding Cato's character based upon his endorsement of the marriage between Marcia and Hortensius. Appian said that "as a girl; [Cato] was extremely fond of her, and she had borne him children. Nevertheless, he gave her to Hortensius, one of his friends,— who desired to have children but was married to a childless wife..." Appian's claim is not accurate however, as Hortensius had a son and heir from his marriage with Lutatia. The supposed sacrifice is used by Plutarch and other historians to illustrate Cato's honorability and his willingness to sacrifice a wife he liked in the name of friendship. This positive interpretation of Cato's character is reflected in Lucan's Pharsalia and how the Uticans mourned his death.

Julius Caesar on the other hand accused Cato of wife trafficking and marrying Marcia off to Hortensius simply in order to gain his wealth. "For why," said Caesar, "should Cato give up his wife if he wanted her, or why, if he did not want her, should he take her back again? Unless it was true that the woman was at the first set as a bait for Hortensius, and lent by Cato when she was young that he might take her back when she was rich." Plutarch asserts that in the reason Cato took Marcia back in 49 BC was because he was fleeing Rome with Pompey as a result of Caesar's approach and needed someone to look after his young daughters and household in his place, which Marcia did.

== Cultural depictions ==
She is the subject of the painting Marcia. In her Masters of Rome series of novels, Colleen McCullough suggests that Cato gave Marcia to Hortensius simply because he could not reconcile his passion for her with his Stoic ideals, that he never let her go emotionally, and that he took her back at the first opportunity.
