= Sempronius Gracchus =

Roman nobleman (died AD 14)

Sempronius Gracchus was a Roman nobleman who engaged in a long-term affair with Julia the Elder, the daughter of Augustus, when she was wife of Marcus Agrippa and, after Agrippa's death, the future emperor Tiberius. It is not clear whether Gracchus can be identified with the triumvir monetalis under Augustus in 15 BC.

Gracchus was involved in an intrigue with the imperial family of Augustus by which he sought to undermine the position of Tiberius. He was married to a woman called Alliaria. His affair was discovered by Augustus who banished him to Cercina (Kerkennah Islands) in 1 BC until he was executed, on Tiberius' orders, after Tiberius' accession in AD 14.

== Bibliography ==
- Rogers, Robert Samuel (1967). "The deaths of Julia and Gracchus, AD 14". Transactions and Proceedings of the American Philological Association. 98: 383–90. doi:10.2307/2935884. ISSN 0065-9711. JSTOR 2935884.
- "Sempronius Gracchus". Prosopographia Imperii Romani (in Latin). Vol. 3 (1st ed.). Berlin: G Reimer. 1898. p. 195.
