= Pompeia (sister of Pompeius Strabo) =

- Born: Picenum
- Spouse: Marcus Atius Balbus
- Children: Marcus Atius Balbus
- Parents: Sextus Pompeius (father); Lucilla (mother)

Pompeia (fl. 2nd and 1st century BC) was a Roman woman. She was an ancestor of the Roman emperors Augustus, Claudius, Caligula and Nero.

== Biography ==
=== Early life and background ===
Pompeia was born and raised into a noble family in Picenum (modern Marche and Abruzzo) a rural district in Northern Italy, off the Adriatic Coast.

Pompeia's mother was a woman called Lucilia. Lucilia's family originated from Suessa Aurunca (modern Sessa Aurunca) and she was a sister of satire poet Gaius Lucilius. Lucilius was a friend of Roman general Scipio Aemilianus Africanus.

Her paternal grandfather was Gnaeus Pompeius, while her father was Sextus Pompeius. Pompeia had two elder brothers Sextus Pompeius and Gnaeus Pompeius Strabo. Through Strabo, she was a paternal aunt to triumvir Pompey and his sister Pompeia.

=== Marriage ===
Pompeia married Marcus Atius Balbus (148 BC–87 BC), a senator of plebs status from Aricia (modern Ariccia). Pompeia and Balbus had a son a younger Marcus Atius Balbus in 105 BC. Her son married Julia Minor, the younger of two sisters of dictator Gaius Julius Caesar. The younger Balbus and Julia had three daughters and a son. One of their daughter, Atia Maior, was mother of Octavia the Younger and the first Roman Emperor Augustus, so among Pompeia's descendants were Octavia and Augustus as well as all the following Julio-Claudian emperors except Tiberius.

== See also ==
- List of Roman women
- Women in ancient Rome

== Sources ==
- Suetonius - The Lives of the Twelve Caesars - Augustus
- Microsoft Encarta Encyclopaedia 2002
