= Lucius Marcius Philippus (consul 56 BC) =

Roman consul in 56 BC

- Office: Praetor (62 BC); Proconsul, Syria (61–60 BC); Consul (56 BC)
- Spouse: Atia
- Children: Marcia; Lucius Marcius Philippus
- Father: Lucius Marcius Philippus

Lucius Marcius Philippus (born before 102 BC) was a politician and senator in the late Roman republic. He was governor of Syria from 61 to 60 and later served in the consulship of 56 BC. He was also step-father of the emperor Augustus.

== Biography ==
Philippus claimed descent from Roman King Ancus Marcius and was the son of the consul in 91 BC and censor in 86 BC of the same name. He also had a brother, Quintus, who served as proconsul in Cilicia from 47 to 46 BC.

His first known office was that of praetor in the year 62 BC. After the organisation of Roman Syria, carved out as a province from the Selucid Empire by Pompey in 64 BC, it was governed by two propraetorian governors. Philippus was one of them. He succeeded Marcus Aemilius Scaurus, who had governed the province as Pompey's proquaestor pro praetore; Phillipus served there two years, from 61 through 60 BC.

Some time after 59 BC and probably after his consulship in 56 BC, Philippus married Atia, niece of Gaius Julius Caesar. This marriage made him step-father to Octavia Minor and Gaius Octavius Thurinus (future Roman emperor Augustus).

=== Consulship ===
In 56 BC, he entered office as consul with Gnaeus Cornelius Lentulus Marcellinus as his colleague. Before the two entered office, they supported putting Publius Clodius Pulcher on trial before elections for aedile; they had secured a senatorial decree to that effect, but after strenuous objections from Clodius' allies in the senate – including Quintus Caecilius Metellus Nepos (then-consul) and Gaius Porcius Cato (a tribune) – it was overruled amid demonstrations by Clodius' supporters. That year, Marcellinus engaged in vehement attacks on Caesar and Pompey, which Philippus supported. The consuls together opposed extension of Caesar's Gallic command and the aims of the so-called First Triumvirate and its members.

When Crassus and Pompey decided to stand for the consulship of 55 BC, Philippus and Marcellinus opposed them; "only by desperate postponement of the elections into the following year", coupled with strong-arm intimidation tactics and Caesar's sending of his men on leave to vote in Rome, were Crassus and Pompey able to overcome the considerable opposition to them and win election as consuls in late January 55 BC.

The next year, 54 BC, Philippus joined Clodius, Cicero, Milo, Pompey, and a number of other senior statesmen (including nine former consuls) in defending Marcus Aemilius Scaurus on charges of repetundae. Scaurus, calling on connections across the aristocracy – "no other trial in the republic evoked the participation of so many distinguished and diverse individuals" – was overwhelmingly acquitted.

=== Civil war ===
In 49 BC, tensions between Julius Caesar and the senate, led by Pompey, turned to open warfare. Philippus was passed over for command by the anti-Caesarians in early January 49 BC due to his family connection to Caesar. Because of this, he was not given a province to govern for the year. However, Philippus did not take Caesar's side, passing anti-Caesar legislation in the Senate. When the Pompeians demanded all senators to vacate Italy and join them across the Adriatic, and sensing the threat implicit in the snub to Caesar, Philippus sought and received a "special dispensation" from Caesar to settle – possible outside Italy – as a neutral, which was "unlikely to have endeared him to the Pompeians". Philippus became a close friend of Cicero, who also avoided the war.

After the assassination of Julius Caesar on 15 March 44 BC, Philippus's step-son Gaius Octavius returned to Italy and was met with news of his adoption in Caesar's will. Philippus cautiously advised him to reject the inheritance, but Octavius declared his acceptance, ushering him into political life.

During the short war between the senate, led by Cicero, and Mark Antony, the senate sent a peace embassy of three men, including Philippus, to Antony urging him to withdraw from Cisalpine Gaul and accept senatorial mediation under threat of war. Cicero criticised the dithering of the ultimatum in his Seventh Philippic and Antony's counter-demands were rejected, precipitating passage of a senatus consultum ultimum and declaration of a state of emergency. The war ended in senatorial defeat: after the senate's armies (led by the two consuls and Octavian) defeated Antony at the Battle of Mutina, Octavian assumed command in place of the consuls, who had died in battle, and allied with Antony against the senate to establish the Second Triumvirate.

The circumstances surrounding his death are unknown, but is presumed to have died a few years after the death of Caesar.

Atia died during summer 43 BC; according to Ovid, Philippus later married one of Atia's sisters, but this is generally considered a mistake. The Philippus that married Atia's sister was in fact his son, the consul suffectus of 38 BC. The elder Philippus lived to old age and Augustus rewarded him for his continued loyalty.

== Family ==
Philippus had a son, Lucius Marcius Philippus, and a daughter, Marcia. His son married his step-mother's sister Atia and later became suffect consul in 38 BC and then proconsul for Spain; his daughter married Cato the Younger and Quintus Hortensius.

The remains of a magnificent villa said to belong to him can be seen in Gaeta.

Political offices
Preceded by Publius Cornelius Lentulus Spinther and Quintus Caecilius Metellus Nepos Iunior	Consul of the Roman Republic with Gnaeus Cornelius Lentulus Marcellinus; 56 BC	Succeeded by Marcus Licinius Crassus and Gnaeus Pompeius Magnus
