= Gaius Maecenas Melissus =

Gaius Maecenas Melissus (/məˈlɪsəs/; fl. 1st century AD) was one of the freedmen of Maecenas, the noted Roman Augustan patron of the arts. His primary importance for Latin literature is that he invented his own form of comedy known as the "fabula trabeata" (tales of the knights). The genre did not prove particularly popular outside of his own work, but Melissus also put together compilations of jokes. Suetonius suggests that there were one hundred and fifty such compilations. Contemporary scholarship also suggests that he may have been quoted in Pliny the Elder's Natural History and may have been a grammarian as well, although none of his original works have survived.
