= Roman villa of Ossaia =

Roman imperial villa

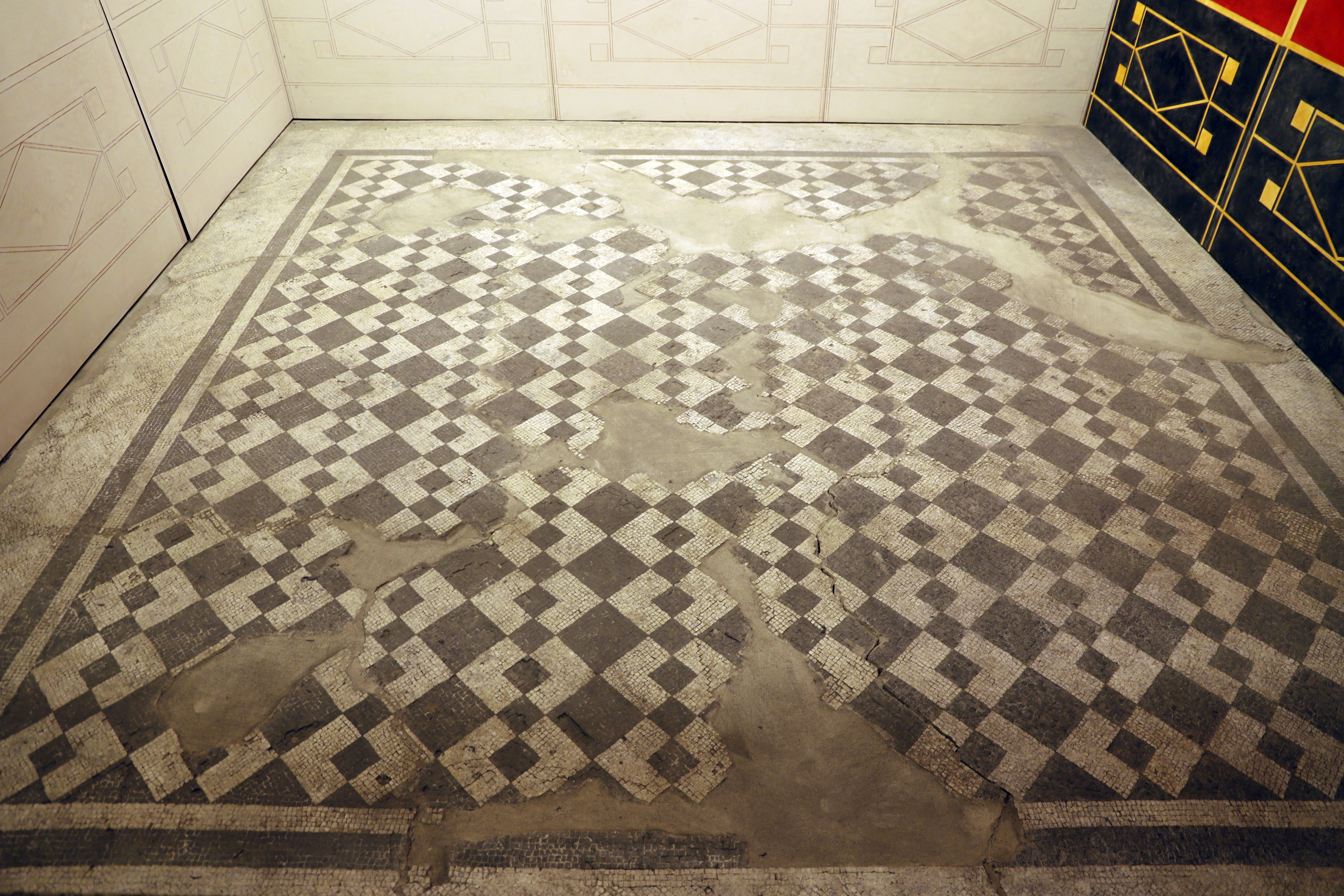
Mosaic of a bedroom, Augustan era

The imperial ancient Roman villa of Ossaia was a large luxurious villa rustica in the rural locality of modern Ossaia, 5 km south of the ancient and modern town of Cortona. It belonged at one time to the family of Augustus, namely his grandsons Gaius Caesar and Lucius Caesar.

== History ==
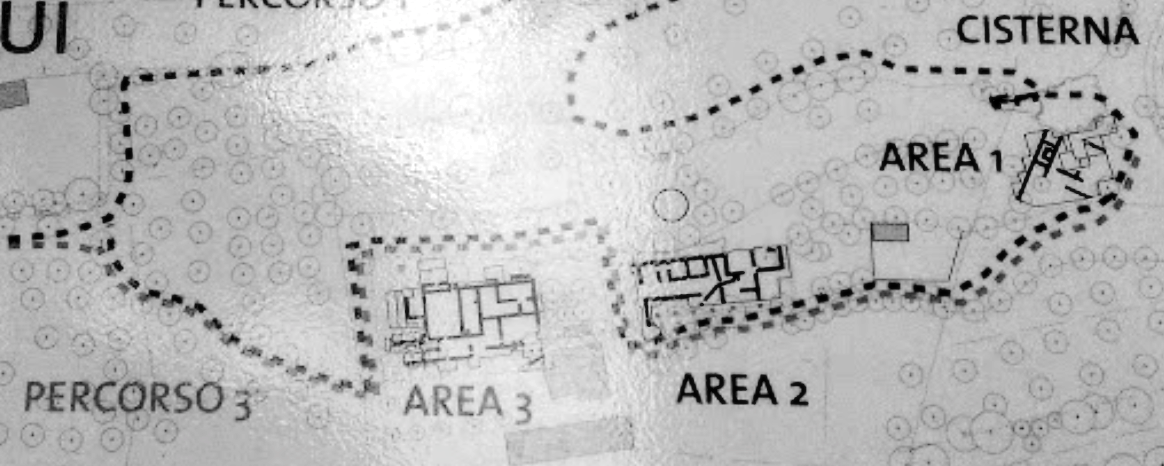
Villa Ossaia plan

The villa was built over an Etruscan sanctuary from the 5th c. BC.

The architectural and decorative models for the luxurious villa of Ossaia were derived from about 100 BC from Rome where similar grand villas were built on the slopes of the Palatine Hill.

The large, terraced villa was built (shown by tile stamps) by C. Avilius (or Annius) Capitus in the late 2nd or early 1st c. BC. Later in the 1st c. BC the villa was monumentalised by the consular family Vibii Pansae and then later by their heirs, Gaius Caesar and Lucius Caesar, grandsons and heirs to the throne of emperor Augustus.

During the second century the villa underwent major architectural changes when residential rooms were turned into workshops, part of the villa was unoccupied and some rooms were rearranged. The lower terraces were converted into a large-scale factory producing wine amphorae, lamps and roof and floor tiles. Wall paintings show that an elite residence was still maintained at the site.

From the 3rd to 6th centuries AD, the site developed further into a village (vicus) surrounding the richer and larger dwelling. Although the villa was modified over this period according to fashion and taste, the original features were maintained. The villa consisted of 3 separate building areas and a large cistern.

== The Villa ==
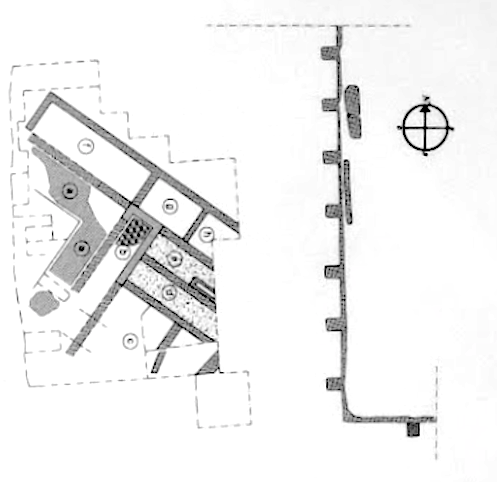
Area 1 plan with cistern

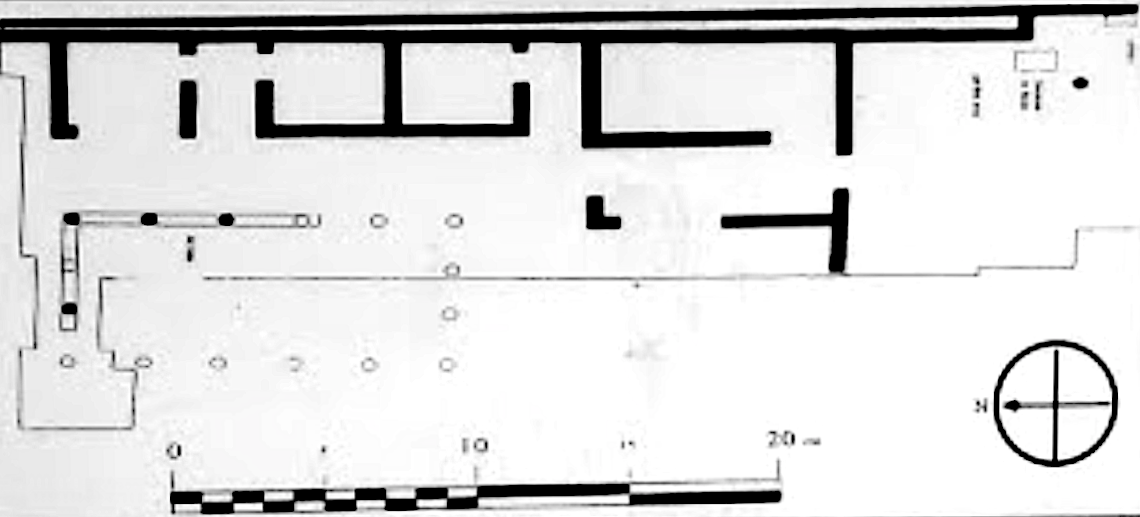
Plan area 2

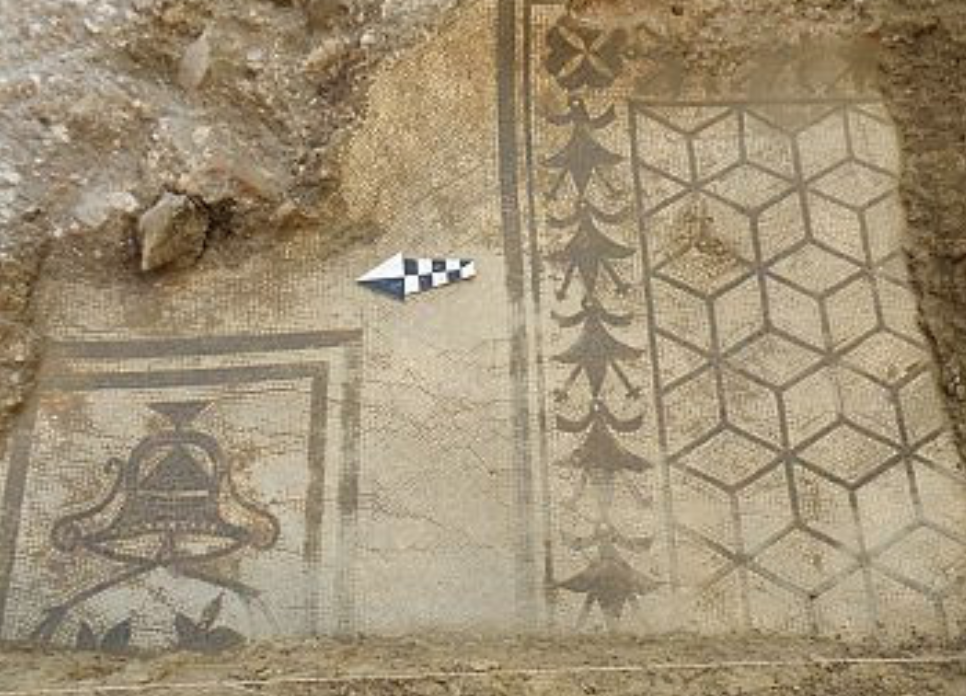
Mosaic

The villa was situated close to the Roman road to Cortona and was raised off the valley floor on a platform supported by a cryptoporticus. The villa was built on at least three terraces on the hillside so that it dominated the area, like many other great villas in the late Republican period, such as those of Marius, Pompey, and Caesar at Misenum and Baiae, and on the model of many Hellenistic sanctuaries, such as the temple of Fortuna Primigenia at Palestrina and others on Delos and Kos.

An immense cistern in opus vittatum (alternating courses of brick and stone) dating from the 2nd c. AD dominated part of the site, and was decorative as its exposed southern face to the road included a line of arches resembling a cryptoporticus. Its size indicates it was mainly used for agriculture and that the estate was prosperous in this period.

Many finds and mosaics from the villa are in the Accademia Etrusca in Cortona.

The main villa consisted of three separate building areas.

=== Area 1 ===
The different orientation of this area underlines its functional distinction from the rest of the site, as this southernmost area was the public part, built around a V-shaped portico that overlooked the via Chiana.

Black and white mosaics of the 1st c. BC to 1st c. AD were found underneath the post Constantinian mosaics visible today from after 300 AD. The importance of this area in the early phase of the villa is confirmed by the terracotta relief plaques, the Campana reliefs. Such reliefs were usually employed in public buildings for sacred or civic functions, and also in the most prestigious private buildings. A group of long rooms alternated with basins and with the terracotta relief plaques to constitute the public entertainment area.

The area 500 m to the south with a nymphaeum and a circular building with a mosaic floor, water supply and basins appears to be a sort of water park.

Despite the fact that the area was modified over the life of the site, the original architectural and decorative features were maintained, and changed only to express the taste and fashion of the owners in the various periods.

=== Area 2 ===
This area was built over the Etruscan sanctuary and was the private and most traditional part of the villa, based around an atrium with a peristyle and garden. The layout of the atrium and the monochrome mosaic around it are similar to the Villa dei Volusii at Lucus Feroniae near Rome.

A staircase led to an upper colonnaded terrace with fountain.

After the first century AD the large rooms of Area 2 cut up into small rooms with hearths, roof tile drains cut through earlier mosaic floors and the floors covered in mortar and used for the production of bricks and tiles maybe by slaves, as indicated by the vast quantity of cooking wares, numerous large plates of Middle Adriatic Terra Sigillata for communal eating.

=== Area 3 ===
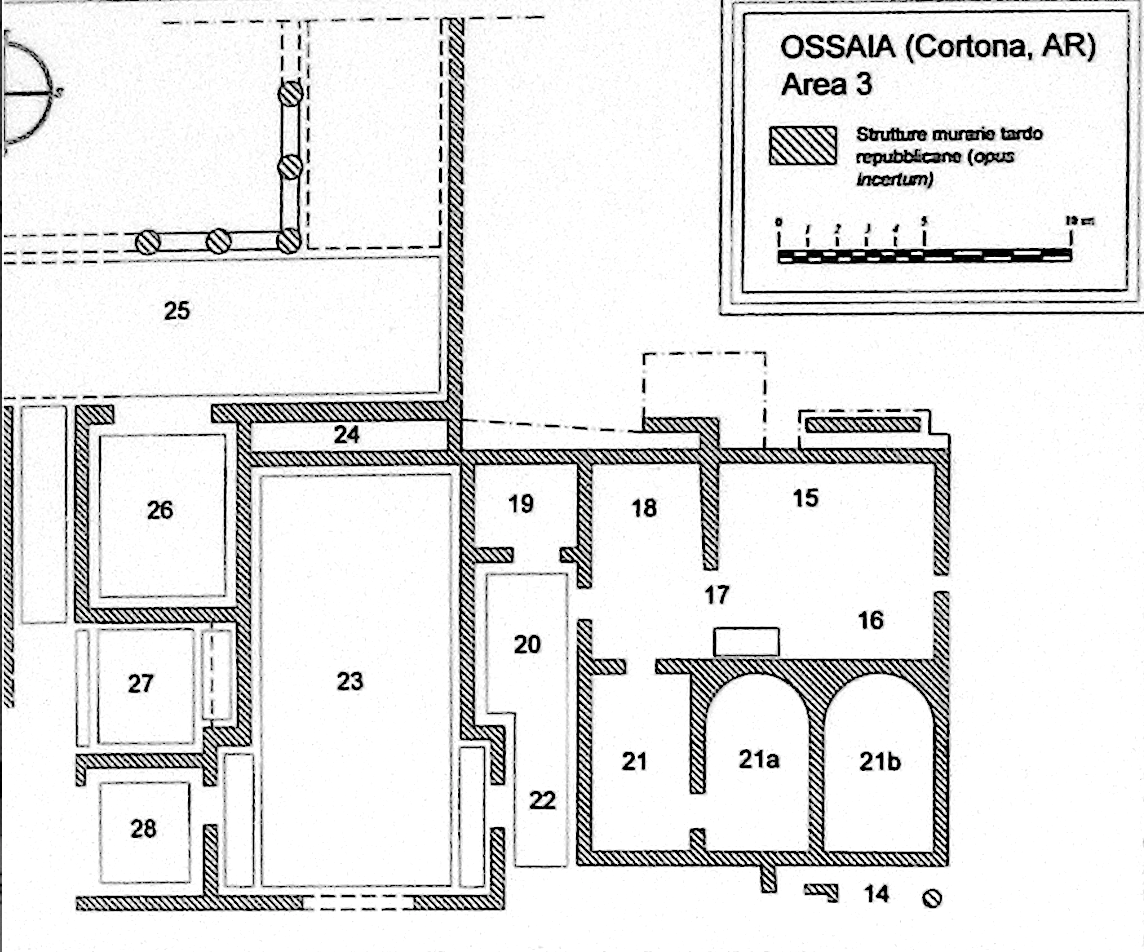
Area 3 Plan 15-18: Garden, 21a: Tepidarium, 21b: Calidarium, 23: Reception, 26: Dining Room

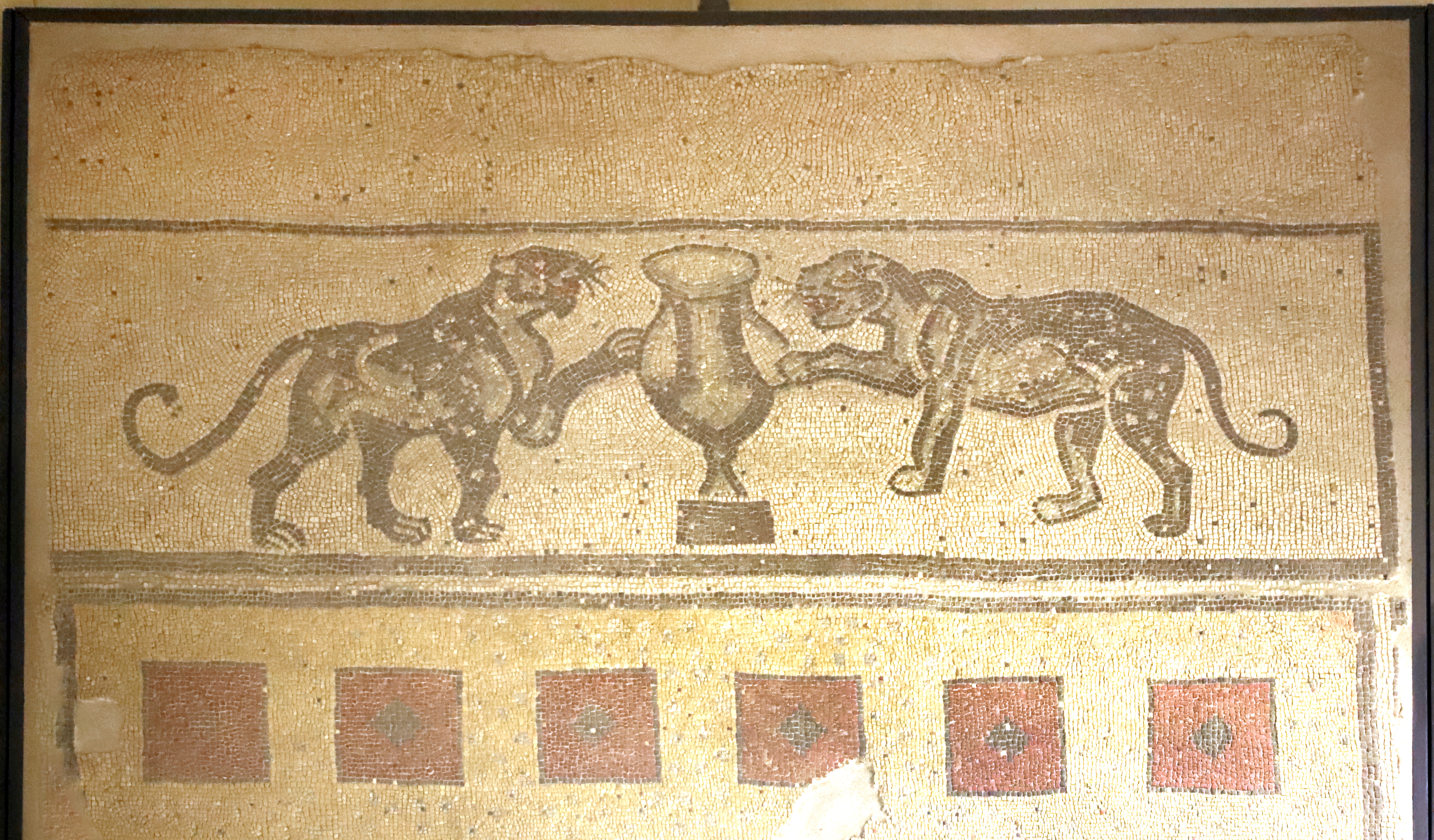
Mosaic from the apse, area 3

This area was built upon the Augustan villa of 1st c. BC- 1st c. AD.

In this area the most important rooms were for private entertainment, one for winter use (no 23) and for summer use (nos. 25–26), identical to such rooms found in important houses at Pompeii and in the winter palace of king Herod at Jericho. The peristyle mosaic with pieces of imported marble, the baths (nos. 21, 21a-b) and internal garden (nos. 15–18) were also important features. In the 2nd c. AD, a kiln for lamps and pottery was built in the garden.

In the early 3rd century this area was again used for entertainment when a large pillared hall was built over the 1st c. BC-AD baths with a large mosaic symbolising the ceremonial fusion of wine-making (the kantharos) and the Dionysiac religious reference of the panthers.
