= Lucius Marcius Philippus (consul 38 BC) =

Roman politician

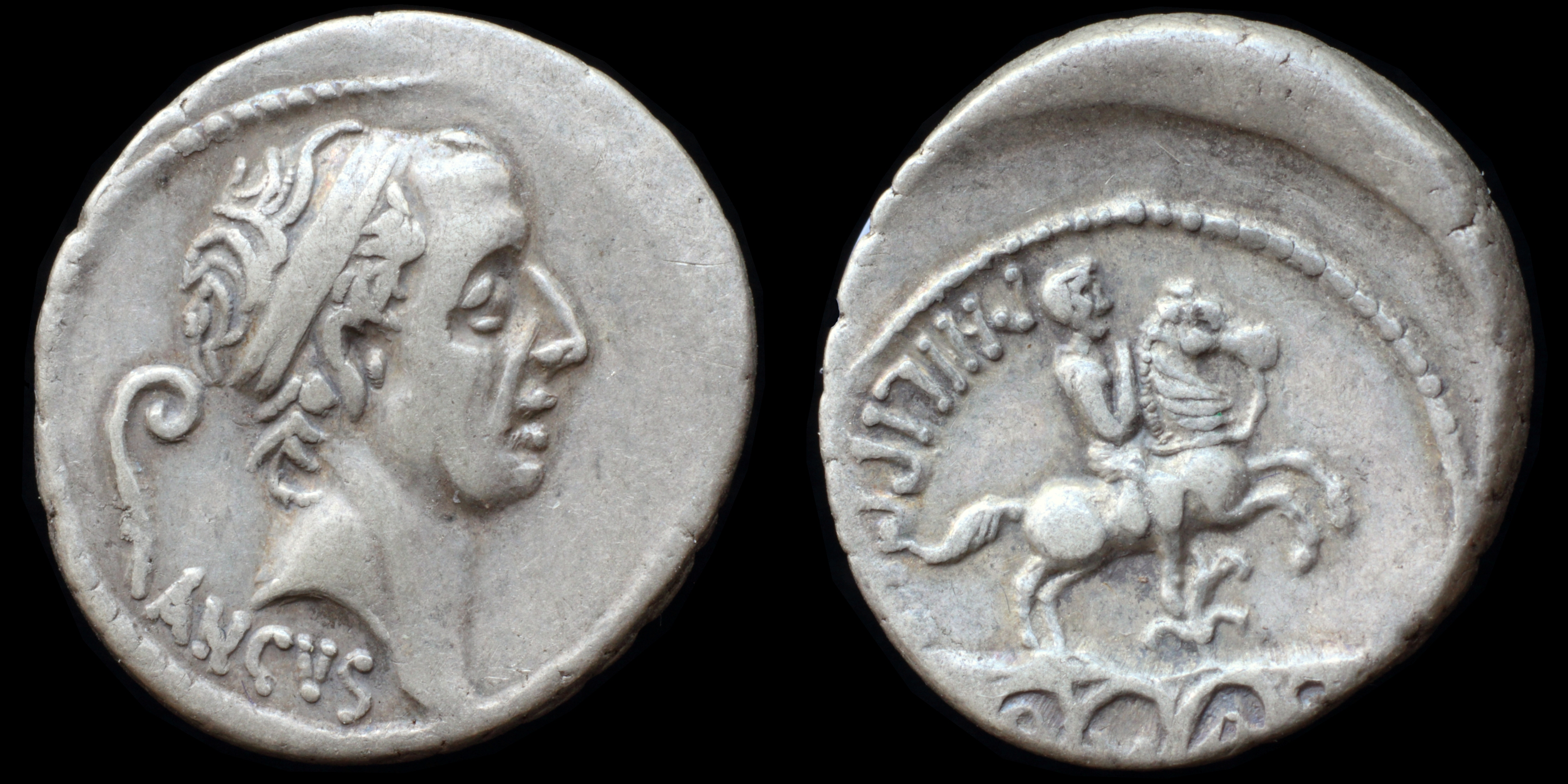
- Silver denarius struck by Lucius Marcius Philippus, c. 56 BC.

Suffect Consul of the Roman Republic
- In office 38 BC – 38 BC Serving with Lucius Cornelius Lentulus
- Preceded by: Appius Claudius Pulcher; Gaius Norbanus Flaccus
- Succeeded by: Marcus Vipsanius Agrippa; Lucius Caninius Gallus

Personal details
- Born: Lucius Marcius Philippus; Unknown Roman Republic
- Spouse: Atia
- Children: Marcia
- Parents: Lucius Marcius Philippus (father); Unknown (mother)

Lucius Marcius Philippus was a Roman politician who was elected suffect consul in 38 BC. He was step-brother to the future emperor Augustus, as well as his uncle (his wife's sister was Atia Balba, mother of Augustus).

== Life ==
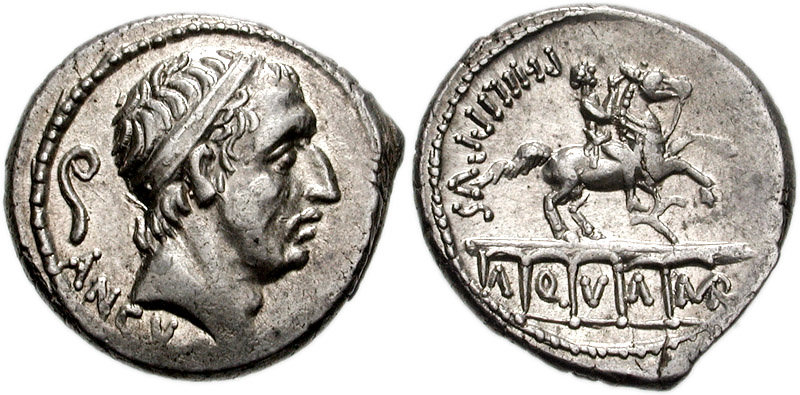

First side of the image: O: diademed head of Ancus Marcius, lituus behind ANCVS
Second side of the image: R: equestrian statue on 5 arches of aqueduct (Aqua Marcia)

PHILIPPVS

A-Q-V-A-(MAR)
Silver denarius struck by Lucius Marcius Philippus in Rome 56 BC. Lucius Marcius Philippus claimed origin of his family from the fourth legendary Roman king Ancus Marcius. Reverse commemorates Romans that the Marcii are responsible for supplies of fresh water.

A member of the plebeian branch of the Marcia family, Philippus was the son of Lucius Marcius Philippus, the consul of 56 BC. By 50 BC, he had possibly become an Augur, one of the priests of ancient Rome. In 49 BC he was elected as Plebeian Tribune, where he vetoed the proposal to send Faustus Sulla, Pompey’s son-in-law, as propraetor to Mauretania, to persuade kings Bocchus II and Bogud to side with Pompey and abandon Julius Caesar. In 44 BC he was elected praetor, and although he was granted a province to administer after his term had finished, he refused to accept the validity of the allotment of provinces agreed to in a Senate meeting of November 28, 44 BC.

With his father's marriage to Atia, he became step-brother to Gaius Octavius, Julius Caesar's heir. His father used his influence to help Philippus to obtain the consulate as one of the suffect consuls of 38 BC; nevertheless, during his consulate Philippus did not declare himself openly for his step-brother in his rivalry with Mark Antony. By 35 BC, he was appointed the proconsular governor of one of the two provinces of Hispania. After serving there for two years, he returned to Rome, where he was awarded a triumph which he celebrated on April 27, 33 BC for his actions while governor. With the spoils of his victories, he restored the Temple of Hercules Musarum in the Portico of Octavius, thereafter known as the Portico of Philippus (Porticus Philippi). Augustus restored the adjacent Portico of Metellus, rededicating it as the Portico of Octavia.

Philippus did not appear to have any living sons to succeed him. Philippus married Atia, daughter of Julia Minor and Marcus Atius Balbus and maternal aunt of Augustus. They had a daughter, Marcia, who later married Paullus Fabius Maximus. Marcia had one son and possibly one daughter: Paullus Fabius Persicus and Fabia Numantina, who may have been the daughter of Maximus's brother Africanus Fabius Maximus.

== See also ==
- List of Roman consuls

== Sources ==
- Broughton, Thomas Robert Shannon (1952). The magistrates of the Roman republic. Vol. 2. New York: American Philological Association.
- Syme, Ronald, The Roman Revolution (1939)
- Holmes, T. Rice, The Roman Republic and the Founder of the Empire, Vol. III (1923)
- Zmeskal, Klaus (2009). Adfinitas (in German). Vol. 1. Passau: Verlag Karl Stutz. ISBN 978-3-88849-304-1.

Political offices
Preceded by Appius Claudius Pulcher; Gaius Norbanus Flaccus	Roman consul 38 BC (suffect) with Lucius Cornelius Lentulus	Succeeded by Marcus Agrippa; Lucius Caninius Gallus
