= Marcus Atius Balbus =

Roman Republican praetor

- Born: 105 BC; Aricia, Italy, Roman Republic
- Died: 51 BC
- Spouse: Julia Minor
- Children: Atia Balba "Prima" (possibly); Marcus Atius Balbus (possibly); Atia Balba "Secunda"; Atia Balba "Tertia"
- Parents: Marcus Atius Balbus (father); Pompeia (mother)

Marcus Atius Balbus (105 – 51 BC) was a 1st-century BC Roman who served as a praetor in 62 BC; he was a cousin of the general Pompey on his mother's side and a brother-in-law of the Dictator Julius Caesar through his marriage to Caesar's sister Julia Minor. Through his daughter, Atia, he became the maternal grandfather of Augustus the first Roman Emperor.

== Early life ==
Balbus was born and raised in Aricia into a political family and was the son and heir of the elder Marcus Atius Balbus (148 – 87 BC). His mother was Pompeia, the sister to consul Gnaeus Pompeius Strabo, father of Pompey Magnus, a member of the First Triumvirate with Julius Caesar and Marcus Licinius Crassus.

The family of the elder Balbus came from a Roman senatorial family of plebeian status from Aricia (modern Ariccia, Italy). "Balbus" in Latin means stammer.

== Career ==
During the consulship of Julius Caesar in 59 BC, Balbus was appointed along with Pompey to a board of commissioners under a Julian Law to divide estates in Campania among the commoners. Cicero stated that Pompey would say as a joke about Balbus, that he was not a person of any importance.

== Personal life ==
He married Julia Minor, the younger of the two elder sisters of the dictator Julius Caesar. Julia bore him two or more daughters and possibly a son named Marcus Atius Balbus. One of the daughters married Gaius Octavius and became the mother of Octavia Minor (fourth wife of triumvir Mark Antony) and of the first Roman emperor Augustus. A younger daughter married Lucius Marcius Philippus and became the mother of Marcia.

Another Atia, who was married to a Gaius Junius Silanus, has been speculated to have existed by Madvig and Syme. This Atia may have been a granddaughter of Balbus and Julia through their son and his marriage to a Claudia.

== Death ==
Balbus died in 51 BC.

== See also ==
- Atia gens
- Julio-Claudian family tree

== Sources ==
- Suetonius, The Lives of the Twelve Caesars, Augustus
- https://web.archive.org/web/20060511155339/http://www.ancientlibrary.com/smith-bio/0464.html
