= Atia (mother of Augustus) =

Mother of Roman emperor Augustus

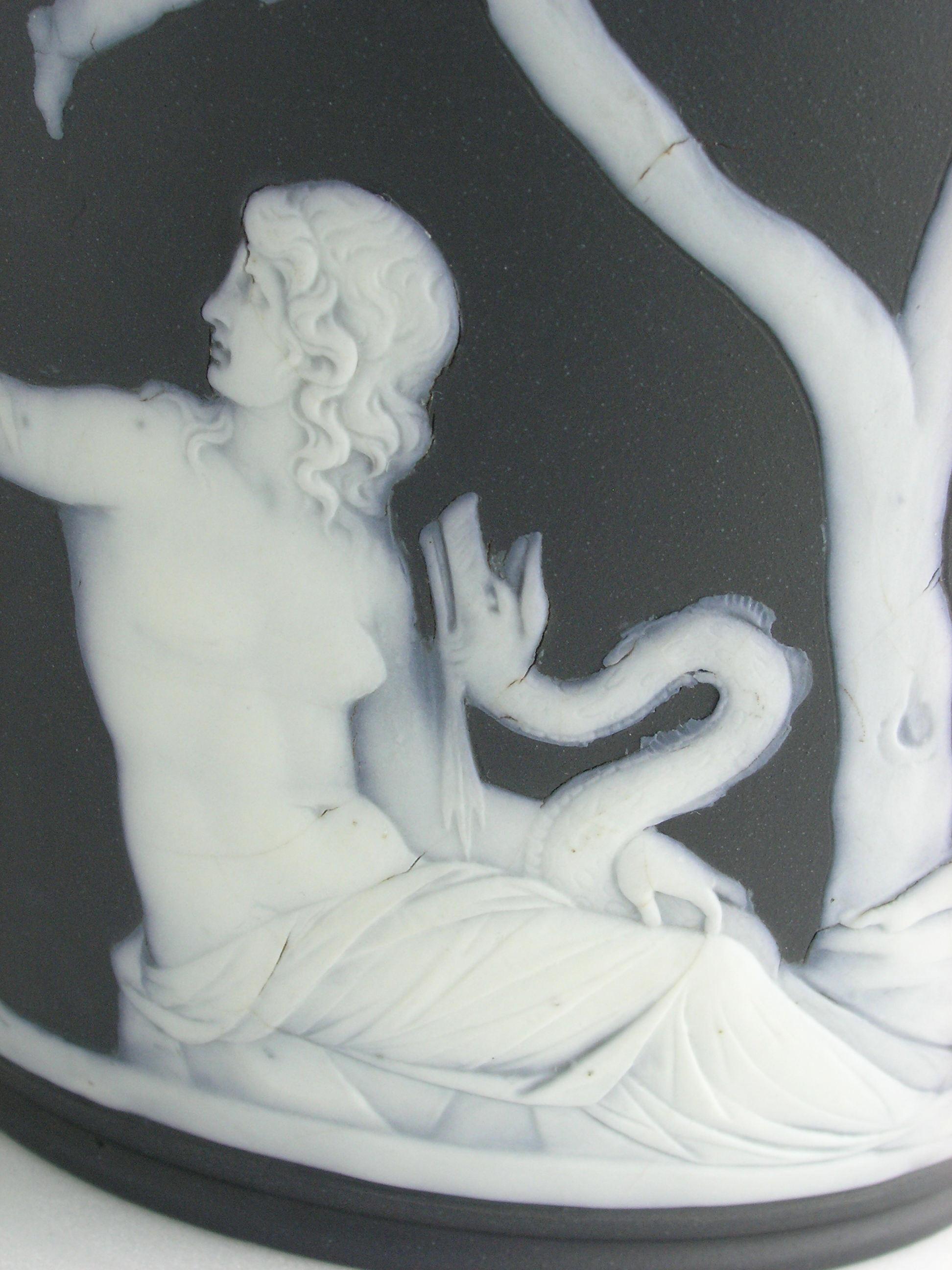
- This scene on the Portland Vase may depict Atia.
- Born: c. 85 BC
- Died: c. 43 BC (aged ~42)
- Spouse(s): Gaius Octavius; Lucius Marcius Philippus
- Children: Octavia Minor; Gaius Octavius (Augustus)
- Parents: Marcus Atius Balbus (father); Julia Minor (mother)

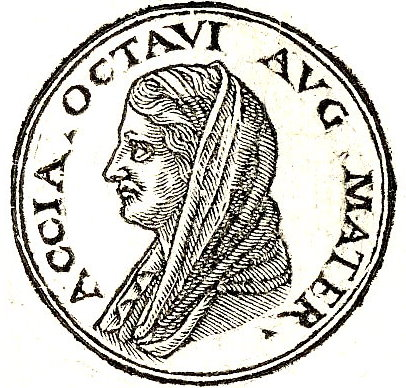
Atia from Promptuarii Iconum Insigniorum (Note: The inscription says "Accia Octavi[i] Avg[vsti] mater", meaning "Atia, mother of Octavi[us] Aug[ustus]." Note that this spelling of her name is erroneous; Accia was the name of a different gens.)

Atia (c. 85 – c.43 BC) was the niece of Julius Caesar (through his sister Julia Minor), and mother of Gaius Octavius, who became the Emperor Augustus. Through her daughter Octavia she was also the great-grandmother of Germanicus and his brother, Emperor Claudius.

== Biography ==
=== Early life ===
Atia was the daughter of Julia Minor and her husband praetor Marcus Atius Balbus. Atia had at least one younger sister and possibly an older one. Because of this she is sometimes called Atia Secunda or Atia Balba Secunda. She may also have had a brother.

=== First marriage ===
Her first marriage was with Gaius Octavius, the praetor in 61 BC and then Macedonian governor. Her family lived close to Velitrae, ancestral home of the Octavii. They had two children: Octavia Minor, born c. 66 BC, and Gaius Octavius (Augustus), born in 63 BC.

Suetonius' account of Augustus mentions the divine omens she (according to her son) is said to experienced before and after Augustus birth:

When Atia had come in the middle of the night to the solemn service of Apollo, she had her litter set down in the temple and fell asleep, while the rest of the matrons also slept. On a sudden a serpent glided up to her and shortly went away. When she awoke, she purified herself, as if after the embraces of her husband, and at once there appeared on her body a mark in colours like a serpent, and she could never get rid of it; so that presently she ceased ever to go to the public baths. In the tenth month after that Augustus was born and was therefore regarded as the son of Apollo. Atia too, before she gave him birth, dreamed that her vitals were borne up to the stars and spread over the whole extent of land and sea, while Octavius dreamed that the sun rose from Atia's womb. (Suetonius:94:4)

The day he was born the conspiracy of Catiline was before the House, and Octavius came late because of his wife's confinement; then Publius Nigidius, as everyone knows, learning the reason for his tardiness and being informed also of the hour of the birth, declared that the ruler of the world had been born. (Suetonius:94:5)

Gaius Octavius died in 59 BC, when the future emperor Augustus was four years old.

=== Second marriage ===
The same year as her first husband died, Atia remarried to Lucius Marcius Philippus, consul in 56 BC. Philippus already had three children at the time; the already adult Lucius Marcius Philippus (consul suffectus in 38 BC who ended up marrying Atia's younger sister), Marcia (the wife of Cato the Younger) and Quintus Marcius Philippus (proconsul of Cilicia in 47 BC). It's possible that she and Philippus had children.

Atia was so fearful for her son's safety that she and Philippus urged him to renounce his rights as Caesar's heir. She died around 43 BC. Octavian honored her memory with a public funeral.

== Cultural depictions ==
A fictionalised Atia of the Julii is portrayed by Polly Walker in the BBC-HBO-RAI television series Rome. There she is portrayed as ambitious, shrewd, manipulative, sexually uninhibited and morally bankrupt; the programme also shows her as involved in a long-term romantic relationship with Marc Antony. Jonathan Stamp, the historical consultant for Rome, stated that in addition to the historical Atia the character version of Atia draws significant influences from other Roman women from the same time period such as the infamous Clodia and Marc Antony’s wife, Fulvia. Unlike her direct historic counterpart, the programme’s Atia lives to see her son become emperor.

== See also ==
- Atia gens
