= Julia Minor (grandmother of Augustus) =

Sister of Caesar and grandmother of Augustus

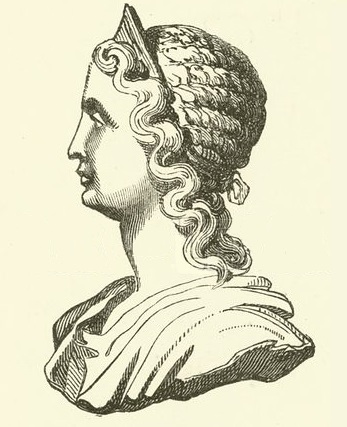
- Born: before 100 BC
- Died: 51 BC
- Spouse: Marcus Atius Balbus
- Children: Atia; Marcus Atius Balbus (possibly); Atia (wife of M. Atius Balbus); Atia (wife of L. Marcius Philippus)
- Parent(s): Gaius Julius Caesar; Aurelia

Julia Minor (before 100 BC – 51 BC) was the second of two daughters of Gaius Julius Caesar and Aurelia. She was an elder sister of the dictator Caesar, and the maternal grandmother of Augustus, Rome's first emperor.

== Biography ==
=== Bona Dea scandal ===
It is not known if it was the elder or the younger of the dictator's sisters who gave evidence against Publius Clodius Pulcher when he was impeached for impiety in 61 BC. Julia and her mother gave the legal courts a detailed account of the affair he had with Pompeia, Julius Caesar's wife. Caesar divorced Pompeia over the scandal.

=== Marriage and offspring ===
Julia married Marcus Atius Balbus, a praetor and commissioner who came from a senatorial family of plebeian status. Julia bore him three (or two, according to other sources) daughters and possibly a son named Marcus Atius Balbus. Their second daughter, Atia, was the mother of Rome's first emperor, Augustus, and of Octavia Minor, the fourth wife of Mark Antony. Julia's youngest daughter was the wife of Lucius Marcius Philippus, and mother of Marcia, a cousin of Augustus.

Another Atia, who may have been her granddaughter through her son (probably from a marriage to a Claudia) may have been married to Gaius Junius Silanus. This Atia was the mother of Gaius Junius Silanus who became consul in AD 10. Sons of Silanus were Appius Junius Silanus (consul in 28), Decimus Junius Silanus (who was involved in the disgrace of Julia the Younger) and Marcus Junius Silanus (consul suffectus in 15).

Balbus died in 51 BC along with Julia. At age 12, Octavius, her youngest grandson, the future emperor Augustus, delivered her funeral oration.

== Sources ==
- Suetonius - The Twelve Caesars - Caesar and Augustus.
- Julia, Dictionary of Greek and Roman Biography and Mythology
