= Julio-Claudian family tree =

Family tree

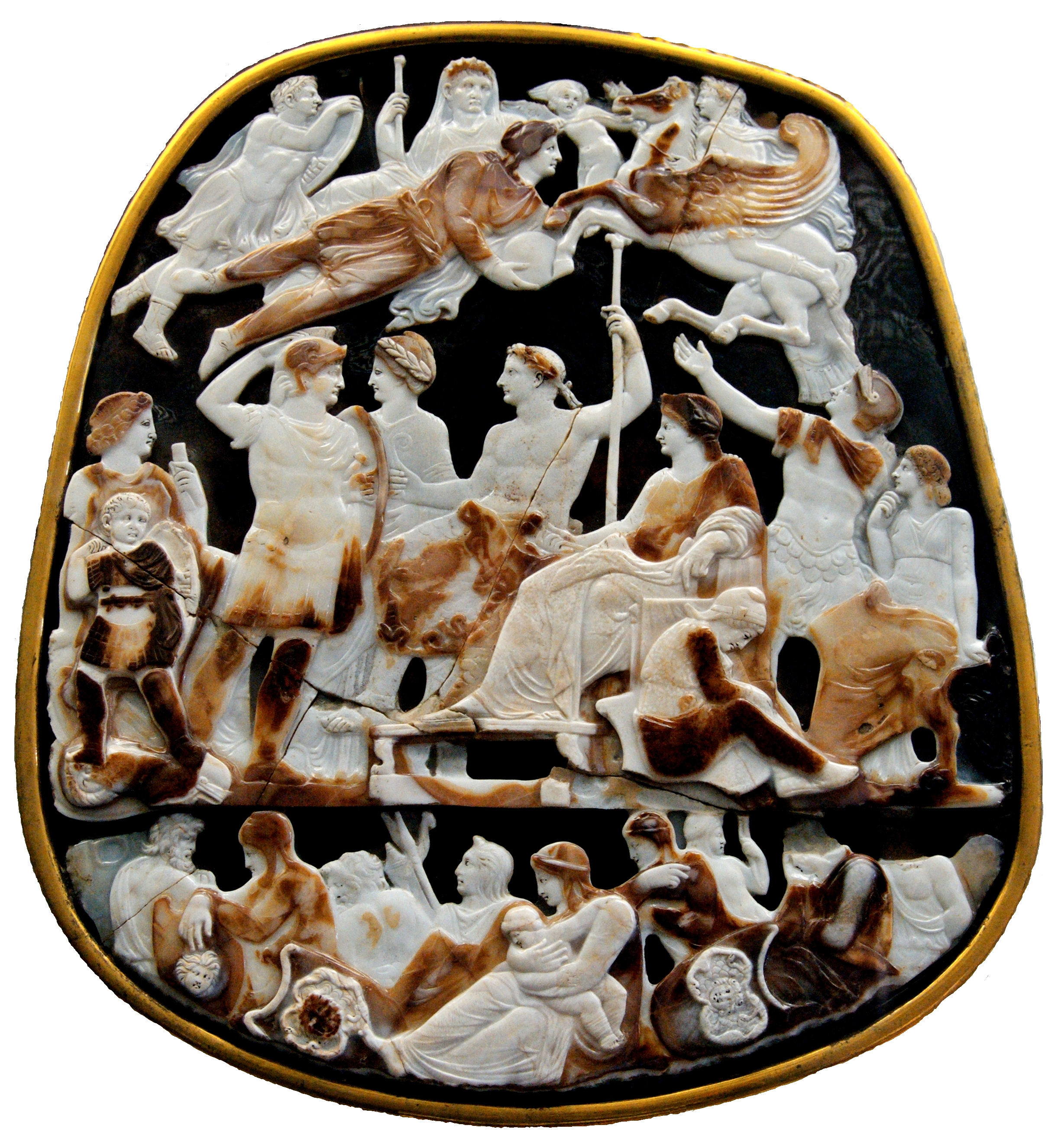
The Great Cameo of France, from around 23 AD, pictures several members of the Julio-Claudian dynasty

Around the start of the Common Era, the family trees of the gens Julia and the gens Claudia became intertwined into the Julio-Claudian family tree as a result of marriages and adoptions. Augustus, born Gaius Octavius and named primary heir of his grand-uncle Julius Caesar, would become the first Roman emperor and also the founder of the reigning Julio-Claudian dynasty in Rome.

== Descendancy of the emperors of the Julio-Claudian dynasty ==
The Julio-Claudian dynasty was the first dynasty of Roman emperors. All emperors of that dynasty descended from Julii Caesares and/or from Claudii. Marriages between descendants of Sextus Julius Caesar and Claudii had occurred from the late stages of the Roman Republic, but the intertwined Julio-Claudian family tree resulted mostly from adoptions and marriages in Imperial Rome's first decades. Note that descendancy of the Julii Caesares before the generation of Julius Caesar's grandfather is in part conjectural, but as presented by scholars.

Julio-Claudian family tree

Sextus Julius Caesar
Gaius Julius Caesar	Sextus Julius Caesar Postumus
Gaius Julius Caesar	Marcia
Gaius Marius	Julia	Gaius Julius Caesar	Aurelia	Sextus Julius Caesar	Lucius Julius Caesar
3 Calpurnia	Julia Major	Julia Minor	Marcus Atius Balbus	Sextus Julius Caesar	Lucius Julius Caesar
2 Pompeia	Gaius Julius Caesar	Gaius Octavius	Atia	Sextus Julius Caesar
1 Cornelia	Marcus Antonius Creticus	Julia
2 Pompey	Julia	1 Gaius Claudius Marcellus	Octavia Minor	2 Mark Antony
2 Scribonia	Gaius Julius Caesar Octavianus Augustus (Gaius Octavius)	3 Livia Drusilla Augusta	1 Tiberius Claudius Nero
1 Claudius Marcellus
2 Julia the Elder	3 Tiberius Claudius Nero	1 Vipsania Agrippina	Drusus the Elder	Antonia Minor
2 Marcus Vipsanius Agrippa
Drusus the Younger	Livilla	1 Plautia Urgulanilla
Julia the Younger	Gaius Caesar	Tiberius Gemellus	Julia Livia	Claudius Drusus
Agrippa Postumus	Lucius Caesar	Agrippina the Elder	Germanicus	2 Claudius	2 Aelia Paetina
Lucius Cassius Longinus	Julia Drusilla	Drusus Caesar	Julia Livilla	4 Agrippina the Younger	1 Gnaeus Domitius Ahenobarbus	Claudia Antonia
Milonia Caesonia	Gaius Caesar (Caligula)	Nero Julius Caesar	3 Valeria Messalina
1 Claudia Octavia	Britannicus
Julia Drusilla	1 Otho	2 Poppaea Sabina	2 Nero
3 Statilia Messalina
Claudia Augusta

Legend
	descent
	adoption
	marriage
1, 2	spouse order

=== Simplified ===
Simplified

Sextus Julius Caesar
Gaius Julius Caesar	Sextus Julius Caesar
Marcia Regia	Gaius Julius Caesar	Lucius Julius Caesar	Popillia
Aurelia	Gaius Julius Caesar	Lucius Julius Caesar	Fulvia
Gaius Julius Caesar	Marcus Atius Balbus	Julia Minor	Julia	Marcus Antonius Creticus
Atia	Gaius Octavius
2 Scribonia	Gaius Julius Caesar Octavianus Augustus (Gaius Octavius)	3 Livia Drusilla Augusta	Tiberius Claudius Nero	Octavia Minor	Mark Antony
2 Marcus Vipsanius Agrippa	Julia the Elder	3 Tiberius Claudius Nero	Drusus the Elder	Antonia Minor	Antonia the Elder	Lucius Domitius Ahenobarbus
Agrippina the Elder	Germanicus	Claudius	1 Gnaeus Domitius Ahenobarbus	Domitia Lepida the Younger	Marcus Valerius Messalla
Milonia Caesonia	Gaius Caesar (Caligula)	Agrippina the Younger	Valeria Messalina
Julia Drusilla	Otho	2 Poppaea Sabina	3 Statilia Messalina	Nero	1 Claudia Octavia	Britannicus
Claudia Augusta

== By generation ==
In the Julio-Claudian dynasty of Roman emperors, the lineage of the Julii Caesares was separated from those of the Claudii up to Augustus' generation. The next generation had both Claudii with a Julia as ancestor, as Claudii adopted into the Julii Caesares family. After Tiberius, the remaining three emperors of the dynasty had, outside adoptions, ancestors in both the Julian and the Claudian families.

=== Generation of Julius Caesar's grandfather ===
Gaius Julius Caesar II and Lucius Julius Caesar II may have had Sextus Julius Caesar, the military tribune of 181 BC, as a common ancestor.

Generation of Julius Caesar's grandfather

Julii Caesares	Marcii Reges	Julii Caesares	Popilii Laenates
Gaius Julius Caesar	Marcia	Lucius Julius Caesar	Popillia
Gaius Julius Caesar	Julia	Sextus Julius Caesar	Lucius Julius Caesar	Gaius Julius Caesar Strabo Vopiscus	Julia

=== Generation of Julius Caesar's father ===
This generation of Julii Caesares has two consuls: Sextus Julius Caesar in 91 BC, and Lucius Julius Caesar the next year. This generation has also two female descendants very close to the centers of power by their marriages: Julia, the daughter of Gaius Julius Caesar II was married to seven-times consul Gaius Marius, while Julia, the daughter of Lucius Julius Caesar II was married to the two-times consul and Roman dictator Lucius Cornelius Sulla, who had successfully challenged Marius' power. For ensuing generations, Gaius Julius Caesar (proconsul of Asia), married to a consul's daughter, and Lucius Julius Caesar proved to be quintessential ancestors of those who held Imperial power in the Julio-Claudian dynasty.

Generation of Julius Caesar's father

Gaius Julius Caesar	Lucius Aurelius Cotta	Gaius Julius Caesar	Marii	Gaius Julius Caesar	Lucius Julius Caesar	Fulvii Flacci	Lucius Julius Caesar	Lucius Julius Caesar	Cornelii Sullae	Lucius Caecilius Metellus Delmaticus
Gaius Julius Caesar	Aurelia	Julia	Gaius Marius	Sextus Julius Caesar	Lucius Julius Caesar	Fulvia	Gaius Julius Caesar Strabo	Julia possibly identical to Ilia a.k.a. Julia Cornelia 1	Sulla	4 Caecilia Metella
Julia Major	Julia Minor	Julius Caesar	Gaius Marius the Younger	Sextus Julius Caesar	Lucius Julius Caesar	Julia	Cornelia	Lucius Cornelius	Faustus Cornelius Sulla	Fausta

=== Julius Caesar's generation ===
Following Sulla's example Julius Caesar's and Pompey's first marriages were with women of their own generation, later marrying women of a younger generation. After being betrothed to Cossutia, Julius Caesar's first wife was Cornelia, the mother of Julia. The younger of Caesar's two sisters married Marcus Atius Balbus: they were ancestors of all the Julio-Claudian emperors, apart from Tiberius.

This is also the generation of Mark Antony's parents. Mark Antony's mother Julia was the daughter of Lucius Julius Caesar: she was an ancestor of the last three emperors of the Julio-Claudian dynasty.

Generation of Julius Caesar

Gaius Julius Caesar	Marcus Atius Balbus	Gaius Julius Caesar	Lucius Cornelius Cinna	Gaius Marius	Quintus Mucius Scaevola Pontifex	Pompeius Strabo	Sextus Julius Caesar (or his son)	Lucius Julius Caesar	Marcus Antonius	Lucius Julius Caesar	Cornelii Lentuli	Sulla	Quintus Pompeius Rufus
Julia Minor	Marcus Atius Balbus	Julius Caesar	1 Cornelia	Gaius Marius the Younger 1	Mucia Tertia 3	2 Pompey	Sextus Julius Caesar	Lucius Julius Caesar	Marcus Antonius Creticus 1	Julia	2 Publius Cornelius Lentulus Sura	Cornelia	Quintus Pompeius Rufus
Marcus Atius Balbus	Atia	Atia Minor	Julia	Gnaeus Pompeius	Pompeia Magna	Sextus Pompey	Lucius Julius Caesar	Mark Antony	Gaius Antonius	Lucius Antonius	Pompeia	Quintus Pompeius Rufus

=== Generation of Julius Caesar's daughter ===
By this time marriages with a political agenda among the powerful families were in full swing, however not yet between Julii Caesares and Claudii. Pompey married Julius Caesar's daughter Julia. Julius Caesar's second wife Pompeia, possibly a great-granddaughter of Lucius Julius Caesar II, was a granddaughter of Sulla. His third wife Calpurnia is said to be younger than his daughter. His son Caesarion resulted from his relation with Cleopatra.

Atia, the daughter of Julius Caesar's sister, married Gaius Octavius: they became the parents of the first emperor of the Julio-Claudian dynasty, then still called Octavianus. Their daughter Octavia the Younger became an ancestor to the last three emperors of that dynasty. In this generation Mark Antony had children by, among others, Antonia Hybrida Minor, and Fulvia.

Generation of Julius Caesar's daughter

Ancharii	Octavii	Marcus Atius Balbus	Sulla	Pompey	Gaius Antonius Hybrida	Marcus Antonius Creticus	Marcus Fulvius Bambalio	Appius Claudius Pulcher	Quintus Pompeius Rufus	Gaius Julius Caesar	Lucius Calpurnius Piso Caesoninus
Ancharia 1	Gaius Octavius	2 Atia	Faustus Cornelius Sulla 1	Pompeia Magna	Antonia Hybrida Minor 2	Mark Antony 3	3 Fulvia	1 Publius Clodius Pulcher	Pompeia 2	Julius Caesar	3 Calpurnia
Octavia the Elder	Octavia the Younger	Octavianus	Faustus Cornelius Sulla	Cornelia Sulla	Antonia	Marcus Antonius Antyllus	Iullus Antonius	Publius Clodius Pulcher	Claudia	(by Cleopatra:); Caesarion

Generation of Julius Caesar's daughter (2)

Julius Caesar	Pompeius Strabo	Quintus Caecilius Metellus Pius Scipio Nasica
Julia 4	Pompey 2	5 Cornelia Metella

=== Generation of the Octavias ===
The Claudii were a powerful gens with consuls and other high ranking politicians in several of its families across several generations. In this generation the first marriages between Claudii and descendants of the Julii Caesares took place. This however didn't mean yet that the dynastic family trees of both gentes got merged into a single one: that didn't happen until the adoption of Claudii by (adopted) Julii Caesares in the generations to come.

Octavia the Younger's first husband was a Claudius from the Marcelli family. Claudia, descending from Claudii, became the first wife of Octavian, who by then was adopted in the Julii Caesares family by the testament of his uncle Julius Caesar. After her first husband's death, Octavia married Mark Antony, who besides the offspring of his first three marriages had had children by Cleopatra.

Augustus daughter Julia the Elder's first marriage was to Marcus Vipsanius Agrippa; their daughter Julia the Younger married Lucius Aemilius Paullus; their youngest child was Junia Lepida married to Gaius Cassius Longinus (consul AD 30). Junia and Gaius granddaughter Domitia Longina married twice: 1) Lucius Aelius Lamia Plautius Aelianus and 2) Emperor Domitian of the Flavian dynasty. Issue from Domitia Longina first marriage was Lucius Fundanius Lamia Aelianus and Plautia, their children married into the Antonine dynasty.

Generation of the Octavias

Gaius Octavius	Appuleii	Claudii Marcelli	Gaius Octavius	Marcus Antonius Creticus	Julius Caesar	Gaius Octavius	Publius Clodius Pulcher	Gaius Sentius	Scribonii	Pompey	Lucius Cornelius Cinna
Octavia the Elder	Sextus Appuleius	Gaius Claudius Marcellus 1	Octavia the Younger	Mark Antony	Octavianus	1 Claudia	Sentia	Lucius Scribonius Libo	Pompeia Magna	2 Lucius Cornelius Cinna
Sextus Appuleius	Marcus Claudius Marcellus	Claudia Marcella Major	Claudia Marcella Minor	(by Cleopatra:); Alexander Helios	(by Cleopatra:); Cleopatra Selene II	(by Cleopatra:); Ptolemy Philadelphus	Scribonia	Lucius Scribonius Libo	Gnaeus Cornelius Cinna Magnus	Magna

Generation of the Octavias (2)

Cornelii Lentuli
Gnaeus Cornelius Lentulus Marcellinus 2
Cornelius Lentulus Marcellinus

Lucius Scribonius Libo
Scribonia
Cornelia

Julius Caesar
3 Augustus
Julia the Elder

Gaius Octavius
Octavia the Younger 4
Antonia the Elder

Marcus Antonius Creticus
2 Mark Antony
Antonia the Younger

Quintus Caecilius Pomponianus Atticus
Pomponia Caecilia Attica 1
Vipsania Agrippina

Vipsanii
Marcus Vipsanius Agrippa 1
Vipsania Marcella

Gaius Claudius Marcellus
2 Claudia Marcella Major
Lucius Antonius

Mark Antony
2 Iullus Antonius
Iullus Antonius

Sextus Appuleius
Sextus Appuleius
Iulla Antonia

Sextus Quinctilius Varus
Quinctilla Varilla
Sextus Appuleius

=== Antonia Major's generation ===
Octavianus, becoming Augustus the first Roman emperor, married Scribonia who gave him a daughter (Julia the Elder). His last marriage was with Livia, a Claudia who had been married to a Claudius. Their son Tiberius, by birth a Claudius, was later adopted by Augustus, thus, like his stepfather Augustus, becoming one of the Julii Caesares by adoption.

Antonia Maior's generation

Fabii	Sextus Appuleius	Sextus Quinctilius Varus	Gnaeus Cornelius Lentulus Marcellinus	Aemilii Lepidi	Gaius Claudius Marcellus	Appius Claudius Pulcher	Marcus Valerius Messalla	Tiberius Claudius Nero	Marcus Livius Drusus Claudianus	Octavii (by birth) - Julii Caesares (by adoption)	Mark Antony	Gnaeus Domitius Ahenobarbus
Fabia Numantina 1	2 Sextus Appuleius 3	Quinctilla Varilla	Cornelia 1	Paullus Aemilius Lepidus 1	2 Claudia Marcella Minor	2 Marcus Valerius Messalla Appianus	Tiberius Claudius Nero 1	Livia 3	2 Augustus	Antonia Maior	Lucius Domitius Ahenobarbus
Sextus Appuleius	Appuleia Varilla	Lucius Aemilius Paullus	Marcus Aemilius Lepidus	Aemilia Paulla	Paullus Aemilius Regulus	Claudia Pulchra	Marcus Valerius Messalla Barbatus	Tiberius	Drusus the Elder	Domitia Lepida the Elder	Gnaeus Domitius Ahenobarbus	Domitia Lepida the Younger

=== Antonia Minor's generation ===
Antonia Minor's husband Nero Claudius Drusus, a.k.a. Drusus the Elder, was a Claudian like his brother emperor Tiberius: they were the sons of Tiberius Claudius Nero, the praetor of 42 BC.

Antonia Minor's generation

Marcus Vipsanius Agrippa	Augustus	Tiberius Claudius Nero	Mark Antony	Gaius Claudius Marcellus	Augustus	Vipsanii	Marcus Valerius Messalla Appianus	Lucius Domitius Ahenobarbus	Quintus Haterius
Vipsania Agrippina 1	1 Tiberius	Drusus the Elder	Antonia Minor	Marcus Claudius Marcellus 1	Julia the Elder 3	2 Marcus Vipsanius Agrippa	Marcus Valerius Messalla Barbatus 1	Domitia Lepida the Younger	Domitia Lepida the Elder	1 Decimus Haterius Agrippa
Drusus the Younger	Germanicus	Livilla	Claudius	Gaius Caesar	Julia the Younger	Lucius Caesar	Agrippina the Elder	Agrippa Postumus	Messalina	Quintus Haterius Antoninus

=== Agrippina the Elder's generation ===
Without son, Augustus had adopted his grandsons (by his only daughter Julia) Gaius, Lucius and Postumus, and his stepson Tiberius, in order to ensure an heir and successor. Around the time of his death only Tiberius remained and he became the next emperor. Tiberius, a Claudius by birth had become one of the Julii Caesares by adoption: from this moment this first dynasty of Roman emperors was both Julian and Claudian. The further emperors of this dynasty had both Julian and Claudian ancestors.

Agrippina the Elder's generation

Tiberius Claudius Nero	Augustus	Marcus Vipsanius Agrippa	Drusus the Elder	Tiberius	Drusus the Elder	Marcus Vipsanius Agrippa	Paullus Aemilius Lepidus	(grandmother: Urgulania)	Drusus the Elder	Sextus Aelius Catus
Tiberius 3	2 Julia the Elder	Gaius Caesar 1	Livilla	2 Drusus the Younger	Germanicus	Agrippina the Elder	Julia the Younger	Lucius Aemilius Paullus	Plautia Urgulanilla 1	Claudius	2 Aelia Paetina
Tiberillus	Julia Livia	Germanicus Gemellus	Tiberius Gemellus	Nero Julius Caesar	Drusus Caesar	Caligula	Agrippina the Younger	Julia Drusilla	Julia Livilla	Aemilia Lepida	Claudius Drusus	Claudia Antonia

=== Agrippina the Younger's generation ===
Caligula was the last emperor adopted into the family of the Julii Caesares. He was a Claudius by descendance, although he had Julii Caesares among his ancestors, from both his mother's and his father's side.

Agrippina the Younger's generation

Drusus the Younger	Germanicus	Tiberius	Marcus Aemilius Lepidus	Marcus Junius Silanus	Germanicus		Lucius Calpurnius Piso	Cassii	Germanicus	Lucius Aemilius Paullus	Germanicus	Publius Vinicius
Julia Livia	Nero Julius Caesar	Drusus Caesar	Aemilia Lepida	Junia Claudilla 1	Caligula 2	2 Livia Orestilla 1	1 Gaius Calpurnius Piso	Lucius Cassius Longinus 1	Julia Drusilla	2 Marcus Aemilius Lepidus	Julia Livilla	Marcus Vinicius

Most marriages remained childless and many potential successors in the dynasty were eliminated after rampant accusations.

Lucius Domitius Ahenobarbus	Germanicus	Lucius Aemilius Paullus	Junii Silani	Marcus Licinius Crassus Frugi	Claudius	Faustus Cornelius Sulla	Memmii	Marcus Lollius	Drusus the Younger	Germanicus
Gnaeus Domitius Ahenobarbus 1	Agrippina the Younger	Aemilia Lepida	Marcus Junius Silanus Torquatus	Gnaeus Pompeius Magnus 1	Claudia Antonia	2 Faustus Cornelius Sulla Felix	Publius Memmius Regulus 1	Lollia Paulina 3	2 Caligula	4 Milonia Caesonia
Nero	Marcus Junius Silanus Torquatus	Junia Calvina	Decimus Junius Silanus Torquatus	Lucius Junius Silanus Torquatus	Junia Lepida	unnamed son	Gaius Memmius Regulus	Tiberius Gemellus	Julia Drusilla

Claudius, the fourth emperor of the Julio-Claudian dynasty, was a brother to Caligula's father Germanicus. He belonged to the gens Claudia with, from his mother's side, Julian ancestors.

Claudius, the fourth emperor

Lucius Domitius Ahenobarbus
Domitia Lepida the Elder 1

Sallustii
2 Gaius Sallustius Crispus Passienus 2

Germanicus
2 Agrippina the Younger 4
Nero

Drusus the Elder
3 Claudius
1 Claudia Octavia

Marcus Valerius Messalla Barbatus
3 Messalina
Britannicus

=== Poppaea Sabina's generation ===
Nero, the last emperor of the dynasty, was by birth a Domitius with as well Julian ancestors (from both his mother's as his father's side), as Claudian (from his mother's side). He became a Claudian himself, by adoption by his stepfather emperor Claudius, a brother to his grandfather from his mother's side, or, from his father's side, a son of his grandmother's sister.

Poppaea Sabina's generation

Lucius Otho
Otho 2

Titus Ollius	Gnaeus Domitius Ahenobarbus	Claudius
Poppaea Sabina 2	3 Nero 2
Claudia Augusta

Statilii
3 Statilia Messalina

== General and cited sources ==
- Miriam Griffin. A Companion to Julius Caesar, p. 13 ff. John Wiley & Sons, 2009. ISBN 9781444308457. (Julius Caesar's descendancy.)
- Antony Kamm. Julius Caesar: A Life, pp. 156 (Genealogical chart of the family of Julius Caesar) and 157 (Simplified genealogical chart of the emperors from Augustus to Nero). Routledge, 2006. ISBN 9781134220335.
- J. W. Meijer (translator). Tacitus: Jaarboeken (Ab excessu divi Augusti Annales). Ambo, 1990. ISBN 902631065X ISBN 9789026310652 – pp. 511 (Julia the Elder's family tree), 532 (Tiberius' family tree), 576–577 (from Gaius Julius Caesar the Elder to Nero)
- Napoleon III. Histoire de Jules César Volume 1, p. 253. Paris: H. Plon 1865. (Julius Caesar's family tree.)
- William Smith. Dictionary of Greek and Roman Biography and Mythology. 1870. Volume 1 p. 536 ff. (Julii Caesares up to the generation before the adoptions started.)
- John S. Wurts. Magna Charta. Brookfield Publishing Company, 1945. Vol. 4 p. 627. (Ordinals for the Julii Caesares with the same praenomen.)
