= Sextus Julius Caesar =

Sextus Julius Caesar may refer to:

- Sextus Julius Caesar (praetor 208 BC)
- Sextus Julius Caesar (consul 157 BC)
- Sextus Julius Caesar (consul 91 BC)
- Sextus Julius Caesar (governor of Syria)

== See also ==
- Julii Caesares
- Sextus Julius
