= Gaius Julius Caesar (governor of Asia) =

Roman senator and father of Julius Caesar

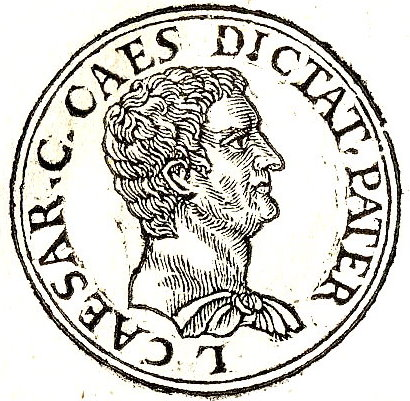
- 1553 depiction of Caesar
- Born: c. 140 BC
- Died: 85 BC (aged 54-55)
- Office: Praetor (92 BC); Governor of Asia (91 BC)
- Spouse: Aurelia
- Children: Julia Major, Julia Minor and Julius Caesar
- Relatives: Gaius Marius (brother-in-law)

Gaius Julius Caesar (/ˈsiːzər/; Latin: [ˈɡaːiʊs ˈjuːliʊs ˈkae̯sar]; c. 140 BC – 85 BC) was a Roman senator, a supporter of his brother-in-law, Gaius Marius, and the father of Roman statesman Julius Caesar. He was also a great-grandfather of Gaius Octavius, the later Augustus.

== Biography ==
His great-grandfather was Sextus Julius Caesar.

Caesar was married to Aurelia, a member of the Aurelii and Rutilii families. They had two daughters, known as Julia Major and Julia Minor, and Julius Caesar the dictator was born to them in 100 BC. He was the brother of Sextus Julius Caesar (consul in 91 BC).

Caesar's progress through the cursus honorum is well known, although the specific dates associated with his offices are controversial. According to two elogia erected in Rome long after his death, Caesar was a commissioner in the colony at Cercina, military tribune, quaestor, praetor, and propraetor of Asia. The dates of these offices are unclear. The colony is probably one of Marius' of 103 BC. Broughton dated the praetorship to 92 BC, with the quaestorship falling towards the beginning of the 90s BC. Sumner dated his term as propraetor of Asia from sometime in 92 to at least January or February 90 BC. Brennan, on the other hand, has dated the governorship to the beginning of the decade.

Caesar died suddenly in 85 BC, in Rome, while putting on his shoes one morning. Another Caesar, possibly his father, had died similarly in Pisa. His father had seen to his education by one of the best orators of Rome, Marcus Antonius Gnipho. In his will, he left Caesar the bulk of his estate, but after Marius's faction had been defeated in the civil war of the 80s BC, this inheritance was confiscated by the dictator Sulla.

== Family ==
Julio-Claudian family tree

Sextus Julius Caesar
Gaius Julius Caesar	Sextus Julius Caesar Postumus
Gaius Julius Caesar	Marcia
Gaius Marius	Julia	Gaius Julius Caesar	Aurelia	Sextus Julius Caesar	Lucius Julius Caesar
3 Calpurnia	Julia Major	Julia Minor	Marcus Atius Balbus	Sextus Julius Caesar	Lucius Julius Caesar
2 Pompeia	Gaius Julius Caesar	Gaius Octavius	Atia	Sextus Julius Caesar
1 Cornelia (wife of Caesar)	Marcus Antonius Creticus	Julia
2 Pompey	Julia	1 Gaius Claudius Marcellus	Octavia Minor	2 Mark Antony
2 Scribonia	Gaius Julius Caesar Octavianus Augustus (Gaius Octavius)	3 Livia Drusilla Augusta	1 Tiberius Claudius Nero
1 Claudius Marcellus
2 Julia the Elder	3 Tiberius Claudius Nero	1 Vipsania Agrippina	Drusus the Elder	Antonia Minor
2 Marcus Vipsanius Agrippa
Drusus the Younger	Livilla	1 Plautia Urgulanilla
Julia the Younger	Gaius Caesar	Tiberius Gemellus	Julia Livia	Claudius Drusus
Agrippa Postumus	Lucius Caesar	Agrippina the Elder	Germanicus	2 Claudius	2 Aelia Paetina
Lucius Cassius Longinus	Julia Drusilla	Drusus Caesar	Julia Livilla	4 Agrippina the Younger	1 Gnaeus Domitius Ahenobarbus	Claudia Antonia
Milonia Caesonia	Gaius Caesar (Caligula)	Nero Julius Caesar	3 Valeria Messalina
1 Claudia Octavia	Britannicus
Julia Drusilla	1 Otho	2 Poppaea Sabina	2 Nero
3 Statilia Messalina
Claudia Augusta

Legend
	descent
	adoption
	marriage
1, 2	spouse order
