= Lucius Julius Caesar =

Lucius Julius Caesar may refer to:

- Lucius Julius Caesar (consul 90 BC), Roman senator, killed by Gaius Marius
- Lucius Julius Caesar (consul 64 BC), Roman senator, uncle of Mark Antony
- Lucius Julius Caesar (praetor 183 BC)
- Lucius Julius Caesar (proquaestor) (died 46 BC), son of the consul in 64
- Lucius Caesar (17 BC – 2 AD), grandson of Augustus

== See also ==
- Julii Caesares
- Lucius Julius (disambiguation)
