= Julia (women of the Julii Caesares) =

Julia (Classical Latin: Iulia) is the nomen of various women of the family Julii Caesares, a branch of the gens Julia, one of the most ancient patrician houses at ancient Rome.

By the time of the later Republic, Roman daughters were seldom given personal names, or praenomina, unless there were several sisters in a family, and were instead known by a variety of less formal names when it became necessary to distinguish between them. A first daughter might simply continue to be known by her nomen alone, especially if she were much older than her sisters, or she might become known as Julia Major ("the elder"), Julia Maxima ("the eldest"), or Julia Prima ("the first"). Younger daughters might become known as Julia Minor ("the younger"), Julia Secunda ("the second"), Julia Tertia ("the third"), Julia Paulla ("little Julia"), and so forth.

Outside the family, some women became known by a combination of their father's nomen and cognomen; the daughter of Lucius Julius Severus would be referred to as Julia Severa in order to distinguish her from other women named Julia. But because many names were very common, this was often insufficient to distinguish among individuals. Often women were identified by reference to their fathers or husbands. Julia, the daughter of Sextus Julius Caesar, might be identified as Julia Caesaris filia ("Julia, daughter of Caesar"). This particular nomenclature has led to the mistaken belief that Caesaris and similar names are the women's surnames, although in fact they are merely the genitive forms of masculine names, and refer to other people. Care must be taken to distinguish between these names and women's cognomina.

== Wife of Sulla ==
Julia (died 104 BC), occasionally called Julia Cornelia by modern scholars, was the first cousin of Caesar's father, and the wife of Lucius Cornelius Sulla.

== Wife of Marius ==
Julia (died 69 BC) was the paternal aunt of Julius Caesar and the wife of Gaius Marius.

== Mother of Mark Antony ==
Julia (c. 104 BC–after 39 BC) was the wife of Marcus Antonius Creticus and mother of Gaius, Lucius Antonius and Mark Antony, the triumvir.

== Elder sister of Julius Caesar ==
The elder of the two sisters of the dictator Caesar, Julia Major was twice married, to Lucius Pinarius and Quintus Pedius, although the order of her marriages is not known. Her grandsons, (Note: Some scholars, including Münzer, suggest that Pinarius and Pedius were Julia's sons, rather than grandsons.) also called Lucius Pinarius and Quintus Pedius, were named Caesar's heirs in the dictator's will, together with their cousin, Gaius Octavius, grandson of Julia Minor, and the future emperor Augustus. Either this Julia or her sister gave testimony against Publius Clodius Pulcher, when he was impeached for impiety in 61 BC. She should not be confused with Julia the Elder, daughter of Augustus.

== Sister of Julius Caesar and grandmother of Augustus ==
The younger of the dictator's two sisters, Julia Minor (101–51 BC), also known as Julia the Younger, was the grandmother of Augustus. She should not be confused with Julia the Younger, granddaughter of Augustus.

== Daughter of Julius Caesar ==
Julia (c. 76–54 BC) was Julius Caesar's only legitimate child to survive to adulthood. Her marriage to Caesar's ally Pompeius was an important familial link within the First Triumvirate, and her death in childbirth in 54 BC was one of the events that led to the unraveling of the alliance.

== Julia Augusta ==
Livia Drusilla (30 January 58 BC–28 September AD 29) was adopted into her husband's family (the Julii Caesares) in his will. She became known as Julia Augusta after her adoption.

== Julia the Elder, daughter of Augustus ==
Julia the Elder (October 39 BC–AD 14), also known as Julia Major, was the only child of Augustus, from his second marriage with Scribonia.

== Julia the Younger, granddaughter of Augustus ==
Vipsania Julia Agrippina (19 BC–AD 29), the daughter of Marcus Vipsanius Agrippa and Julia the Elder, also known as Julia the Younger or Julia Minor, was the granddaughter of the first Roman emperor Augustus Caesar. Although a member of the imperial family, she technically belonged to the Vipsanii Agrippae, and was not a member of the Julia gens.

== Julia Livia, daughter of Drusus Julius Caesar ==
Julia Livia (c. AD 7–43), was the daughter of Drusus Julius Caesar and Livilla. She was the granddaughter of Tiberius, and the elder sister of Tiberius Gemellus. She is sometimes called Livia Julia, not to be confused with Julia Livia.

== Julia Agrippina ==
Julia Agrippina, Agrippina the Younger or Agrippina Minor (AD 15–59) was the eldest daughter of Germanicus. Her father, a member of the gens Claudia by birth, was adopted into the family of the Julii Caesares by Tiberius. This Agrippina is rarely referred to as "Julia".

== Julia Drusilla, sister of Caligula ==
The younger sister of Agrippina the Younger and the emperor Caligula, Julia Drusilla, or simply Drusilla (AD 16–38), is seldom referred to as "Julia".

== Julia Drusilla, daughter of Caligula ==
Julia Drusilla (AD 39–41), Caligula's daughter, was named after his sister. She was slain when her father was assassinated.

== Julia Livilla ==
Julia Livilla (c. AD 18–c. 41) was the youngest child of Germanicus and Agrippina the Elder and the youngest sister of the Emperor Caligula.

== See also ==
- Julia gens
- Julii Caesares
- Julio-Claudian family tree
- Women in Rome
- SPQR series (in this series another Julia Caesaris is a fictional niece of Julius Caesar, apparently through his brother)
