= Julii Caesares =

Roman patrician family

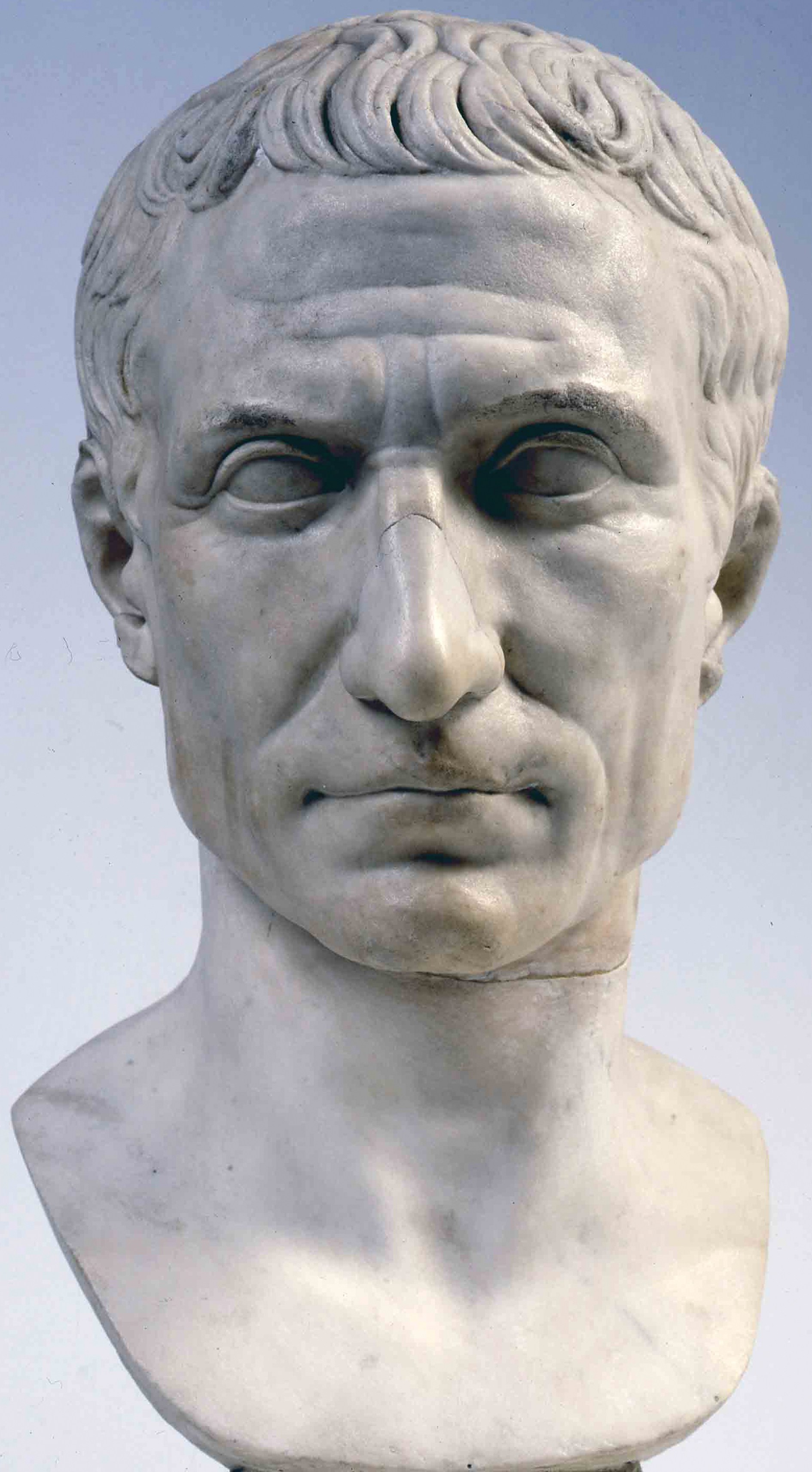
Gaius Julius Caesar, the dictator

The Julii Caesares were the most illustrious family of the patrician gens Julia. The family first appears in history in 208 BC, during the Second Punic War, when Sextus Julius Caesar was praetor in Sicily. His son, Sextus Julius Caesar, obtained the consulship in 157 BC; but the most famous descendant of this stirps is Gaius Julius Caesar, a general who conquered Gaul and became the undisputed master of Rome following the Civil War. Having been granted dictatorial power by the Roman Senate and instituting a number of political and social reforms, he was assassinated in 44 BC. After overcoming several rivals, Caesar's adopted son and heir, Gaius Julius Caesar Octavianus, was proclaimed Augustus by the senate, inaugurating what became the Julio-Claudian line of Roman emperors.

== History ==
The first of the Julii Caesares to appear in history was Sextus Julius Caesar, praetor in Sicily in 208 BC. From the filiation of his son, Sextus, "Sex. f. L. n.", we know that his father was named Lucius, but precisely who this Lucius was and whether he bore the surname Caesar is uncertain. On the assumption that the Caesares were descended from earlier notable families of the Julia gens, some scholars have suggested that he was the son of Lucius Julius Libo, consul in 267 BC.

The Dictionary of Greek and Roman Biography and Mythology says this of the cognomen Caesar:

It is uncertain which member of the Julia gens first obtained the surname of Caesar, but the first who occurs in history is Sextus Julius Caesar, praetor in BC 208. The origin of the name is equally uncertain. Spartianus, in his life of Aelius Verus, mentions four different opinions respecting its origin:

1. That the word signified an elephant in the language of the Moors, and was given as a surname to one of the Julii because he had killed an elephant.
2. That it was given to one of the Julii because he had been cut (caesus) out of his mother's womb after her death; or
3. Because he had been born with a great quantity of hair (caesaries) on his head; or
4. Because he had azure-colored (caesii) eyes of an almost supernatural kind.

Of these opinions the third, which is also given by Festus, seems to come nearest the truth. Caesar and caesaries are both probably connected with the Sanskrit kêsa, "hair", and it is quite in accordance with the Roman custom for a surname to be given to an individual from some peculiarity in his personal appearance. The second opinion, which seems to have been the most popular one with the ancient writers, arose without doubt from a false etymology. With respect to the first, which was the one adopted, says Spartianus, by the most learned men, it is impossible to disprove it absolutely, as we know next to nothing of the ancient Moorish language; but it has no inherent probability in it; and the statement of Servius is undoubtedly false, that the grandfather of the dictator obtained the surname on account of killing an elephant with his own hand in Africa, as there were several of the Julii with this name before his time.

An inquiry into the etymology of this name is of some interest, as no other name has ever obtained such celebrity — "clarum et duraturum cum aeternitate mundi nomen." It was assumed by Augustus as the adopted son of the dictator, and was by Augustus handed down to his adopted son Tiberius. It continued to be used by Caligula, Claudius, and Nero, as members either by adoption or female descent of Caesar's family; but though the family became extinct with Nero, succeeding emperors still retained it as part of their titles, and it was the practice to prefix it to their own name, as for instance, Imperator Caesar Domitianus Augustus. When Hadrian adopted Aelius Verus, he allowed the latter to take the title of Caesar; and from this time, though the title of Augustus continued to be confined to the reigning prince, that of Caesar was also granted to the second person in the state and the heir presumptive to the throne.

Outside of the Imperial family, the last of the Julii known to have borne the surname of Caesar was Lucius Julius Caesar, who had been consul in 64 BC, and who was still living in 40 BC. Although other members of the family may have lived after this time, none seem to have achieved sufficient prominence to be recorded in subsequent generations.

== Descendancy ==
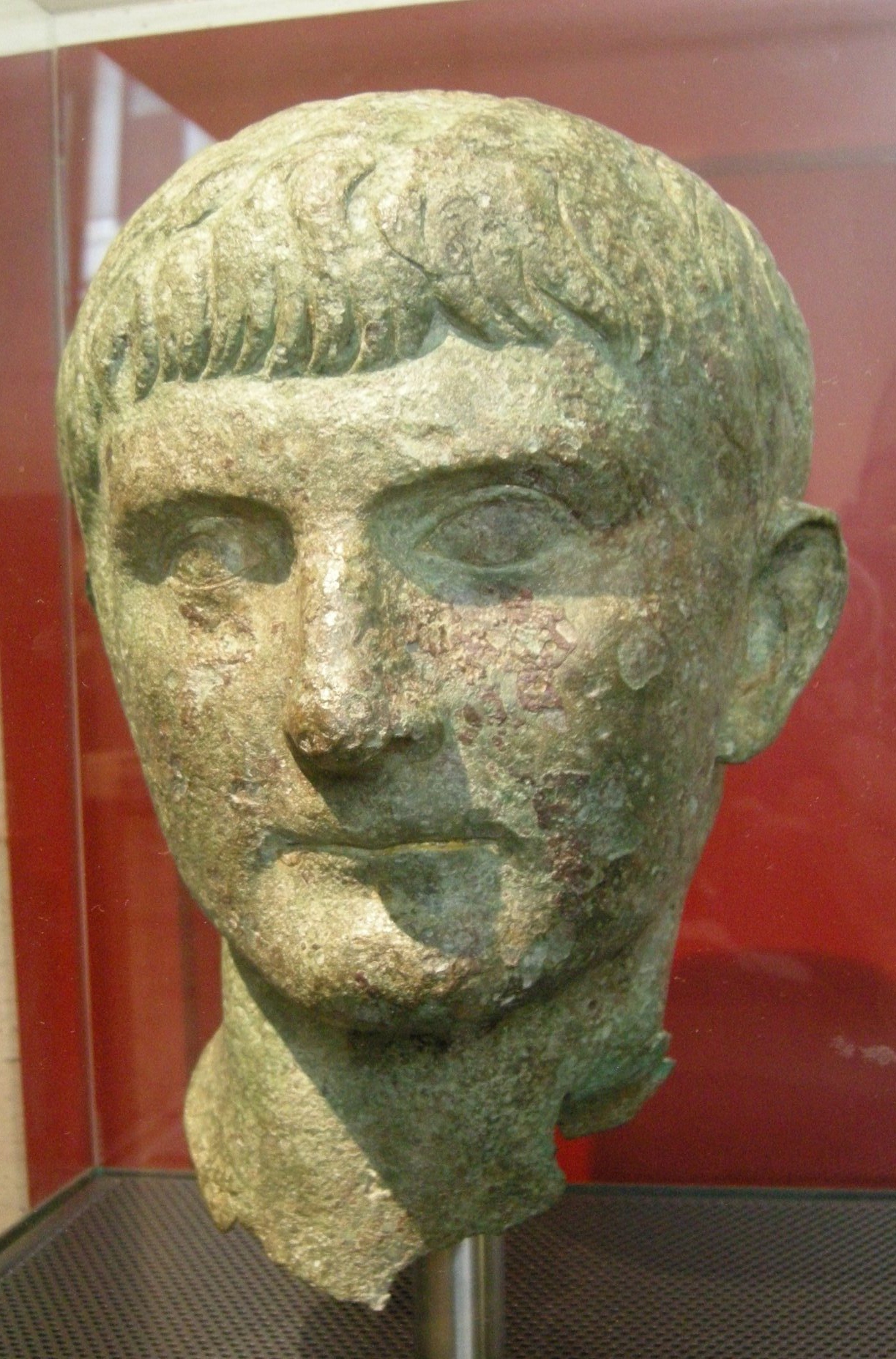
Germanicus Julius Caesar, adopted son of the emperor Tiberius.

The genealogy of the Julii Caesares was studied by Wilhelm Drumann in his monumental history of Rome, and the following tables are based largely on his reconstruction of the family. (Note: Drumann was not the first modern historian to investigate the Julii. In 1816, an English genealogist, William Berry, published a work entitled Genealogia Antiqua, or Mythological and Classical Tables, Compiled from the Best Authors on Fabulous and Ancient History, in which he asserted that the family was descended from a certain Numerius Julius Caesar (for whom no evidence exists). Berry, who did not cite or otherwise identify any of the "best authors" upon which he relied in compiling his tables (indeed, in his introduction, he merely apologizes for not having room in the tables to do so), includes a number of dubious names and relationships in his genealogy of the Julii, many of which are not found in any known ancient source, and in some cases are flatly contradicted by them; many appear to have been invented by Berry or one of his unnamed sources merely in order to fill gaps or otherwise improve the genealogy. Berry anticipates Drumann's error in assuming that Sextus Julius Caesar, the military tribune of 181 BC, and Sextus, the consul of BC 157, were father and son; and also Griffin's conjecture that the family is descended from Lucius Julius Libo, consul in 267.) In most respects, Drumann's genealogy forms the basis for modern scholarship on the family, with one important exception: Drumann believed that the Sextus Julius Caesar who was a military tribune in 181 BC and the Sextus who was consul in BC 157 were father and son. While chronology suggested that the tribune might be the son of the Sextus who had been praetor in 208 BC, the consul's filiation indicated that his grandfather's name was Lucius. Accordingly, Drumann inferred the existence of an otherwise unknown Lucius Julius Caesar between the praetor and the military tribune, although in order to make sense chronologically, the praetor would have to have been rather elderly and the tribune very young when they held their respective offices. (Note: Even more confusingly, the consul held office only twenty-four years after the military tribune. Normally a consul would have attained the age of forty before becoming eligible for this magistracy, while military tribunes were typically young men. In order to have had a son who was at least forty years old in 157 BC, the tribune Sextus would have to have been born around 217 BC, when his grandfather was probably a young man.) More recent scholarship has concluded that the military tribune and the consul were the same man, which means that his grandfather, Lucius, was the father of the praetor of 208 BC, rather than his son.

It is therefore Sextus, the praetor of 208 BC, rather than an otherwise unknown Lucius Julius Caesar, who was the father of Lucius Julius Caesar, praetor in 183 BC, and Sextus, the consul of 157 BC. These sons provide the first two branches of the family; but the third branch, representing the ancestors of Gaius Julius Caesar, the dictator, are less certain. We know that Caesar's grandfather was also named Gaius, and that he married a woman of the Marcia gens. Drumann supposed that he might have been the son of a senator named Gaius Julius, who wrote a Roman history in Greek about 143 BC. This Gaius, he proposed, might have been a brother of Sextus Julius Caesar, the consul of 157, and therefore a son of the Sextus who was military tribune in 181. Since the two Sexti were in fact the same man, this would probably make the senator Gaius a third son of Sextus Julius Caesar, the praetor of 208 BC. If he was a senator in 143, and the great-grandfather of Caesar, who was born in BC 100, he was probably not the consul's son, as his eponymous and presumably eldest son, Sextus, was praetor in BC 123.

The rest of the genealogy is well-known. As Caesar left no legitimate sons to carry on his name and legacy, (Note: Caesar did have a son, known to history as Caesarion, by Cleopatra VII of Egypt, about 47 BC; he was a small child when his father was murdered. Octavian had him put to death in 30 BC, in order to prevent future revolts in his name.) by his will he adopted his grand-nephew, Gaius Octavius, who thus became "Gaius Julius Caesar Octavianus", (Note: He himself never used the name "Octavianus", although it was used by his contemporaries. During his early career he usually called himself "Gaius Caesar"; later placing the title Imperator instead of "Gaius". The practice of avoiding the use of the nomen (family name) was also followed by Marcus Vipsanius Agrippa and Augustus' successors.) the future emperor Augustus. Octavian had only a daughter, and therefore adopted two of his grandchildren by Marcus Vipsanius Agrippa, who thus became Gaius and Lucius Julius Caesar; but when both died young, the emperor adopted their brother, who became Agrippa Julius Caesar (Postumus), and a stepson, Tiberius Claudius Nero, who became Tiberius Julius Caesar. Tiberius' son, Nero Claudius Drusus, became Drusus Julius Caesar, and he adopted a nephew, Tiberius Claudius Nero Germanicus, who became Germanicus Julius Caesar; their children also became part of the Julia gens. The line draws to a close with the death of Germanicus' son, Gaius Julius Caesar Germanicus, better known simply as Gaius or Caligula, in AD 41; after this, the imperial authority passed to Gaius' uncle, Tiberius Claudius Nero Germanicus, and out of the Julian line.

== Genealogical tables ==
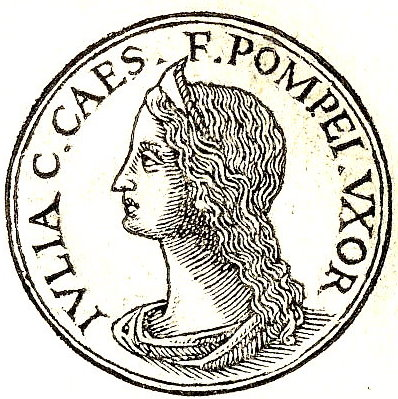
Coin of Julia. Inscription means: Julia, daughter of Gaius Caesar, wife of Pompeius.

The table below reflects known and probable relationships, with speculative descent indicated by a question mark "(?)".

- Lucius Julius (Libo?)
  - Sextus Julius Caesar, praetor in 208 BC.
    - Lucius Julius Caesar, praetor in 183 BC.
      - Lucius Julius Caesar, praetor in 166 BC.
    - Sextus Julius Caesar, consul in 157 BC.
      - Sextus Julius Caesar, praetor in 123 BC.
      - Lucius Julius Caesar, married Poppilia.
        - Lucius Julius Caesar, married Fulvia. Consul in 90 BC, he was put to death by Fimbria in 87.
          - Lucius Julius Caesar, consul in 64 BC.
            - Lucius Julius Caesar filius, a partisan of Pompeius during the Civil War.
          - Julia, wife of (1) Marcus Antonius Creticus and (2) Publius Cornelius Lentulus Sura; mother of Marcus Antonius, the triumvir.
        - Gaius Julius Caesar Strabo, the orator, put to death by Fimbria in 87.
        - (?) Julia, wife of Lucius Cornelius Sulla Felix.
    - (?) Gaius Julius Caesar, a senator, said to have written a Roman history in Greek.
      - (?) Gaius Julius Caesar, grandfather of the dictator, married Marcia.
        - Gaius Julius Caesar, married Aurelia. Praetor in an uncertain year, he died suddenly in BC 84.
          - Julia Major, wife of (1) Lucius Pinarius and (2) Quintus Pedius; grandmother of Lucius Pinarius and Quintus Pedius.
          - Julia Minor, wife of Marcus Atius Balbus; grandmother of Octavia the Younger and Gaius Julius Caesar Octavianus
          - Gaius Julius Caesar, the dictator, married (1) Cornelia, (2) Pompeia, (3) Calpurnia.
            - Julia, wife of Gnaeus Pompeius Magnus.
            - Ptolemaeus Caesar (Caesarion), son by Cleopatra.
            - (by adoption) Gaius Julius Caesar Octavianus, grandnephew (through Caesar's sister Julia Minor), born Gaius Octavius; subsequently known as the emperor Augustus, married (1) Claudia, (2) Scribonia, (3) Livia.
              - Julia the Elder, wife of (1) Marcus Claudius Marcellus, (2) Marcus Vipsanius Agrippa, (3) Tiberius Claudius Nero
              - (by adoption) Gaius (Julius) Caesar, grandson, born Gaius Vipsanius Agrippa, married Claudia Livia Julia.
              - (by adoption) Lucius (Julius) Caesar, grandson, born Lucius Vipsanius Agrippa.
              - (by adoption) Tiberius (Julius) Caesar, (Note: Tiberius (as well as several other members of the Julio-Claudian dynasty), generally refrained from using the nomen Julius. However, he is still referred to as "Julius" by some inscriptions.) stepson, son-in-law and successor, born Tiberius Claudius Nero; married (1) Vipsania Agrippina, (2) Julia the Elder.
                - Tiberius Claudius Nero (Tiberillus), died in infancy, 11 BC.
                - Drusus Julius Caesar the Younger, born Nero Claudius Drusus, married Claudia Livia Julia.
                  - Julia Livia, wife of (1) Nero Julius Caesar Germanicus, (2) Gaius Rubellius Blandus.
                  - Tiberius Julius Caesar Nero Gemellus, put to death by Caligula, circa AD 38.
                  - Tiberius Claudius Caesar Germanicus Gemellus, died AD 23.
                - (by adoption) Germanicus Julius Caesar, nephew, born Tiberius Claudius Nero; married Vipsania Agrippina.
                  - Nero Julius Caesar, accused of treason, he died in AD 31. Married Julia Livia.
                  - Drusus (Julius) Caesar, accused of treason, he died in AD 33. Married Aemilia Lepida.
                  - Gaius (Julius) Caesar Germanicus, better known as the emperor Caligula, married (1) Junia Claudilla, (2) Livia Orestilla, (3) Lollia Paulina, (4) Milonia Caesonia.
                    - Julia Drusilla.
                  - Julia Agrippina, better known as Agrippina the Younger, wife of (1) Gnaeus Domitius Ahenobarbus, (2) Gaius Sallustius Crispus, (3) Tiberius Claudius Drusus, the emperor Claudius; mother of Emperor Nero.
                  - Julia Drusilla, wife of (1) Lucius Cassius Longinus, (2) Marcus Aemilius Lepidus.
                  - Julia Livilla, wife of Marcus Vinicius.
              - (by adoption) Agrippa Julius Caesar, grandson, born Marcus Vipsanius Agrippa Postumus.
        - Julia, wife of Gaius Marius.
        - Sextus Julius Caesar, consul in BC 91.
          - Sextus Julius Caesar, Flamen Quirinalis.
            - Sextus Julius Caesar, governor of Syria, killed in a revolt, BC 46.

=== Male lineage ===
The male line of the family, showing both natural and adoptive lineage through the Julio-Claudian emperors.

L. Julius (Libo?)
Sex. Julius Caesar pr. 208 BC
L. Julius Caesar pr. 183 BC	Sex. Julius Caesar cos. 157 BC	C. Julius Caesar?
L. Julius Caesar pr. 166 BC	Sex. Julius Caesar pr. 123 BC	L. Julius Caesar	C. Julius Caesar
L. Julius Caesar cos. 90 BC	C. Julius Caesar Strabo	C. Julius Caesar d. 85 BC	Sex. Julius Caesar cos. 91 BC
L. Julius Caesar cos. 64 BC	C. Julius Caesar d. 44 BC	Sex. Julius Caesar; Flamen Quirinalis
L. Julius Caesar d. 46 BC	Ptolemaeus Caesar(ion) d. 30 BC	C. Julius Caesar Octavianus; Augustus d. AD 14	Sex. Julius Caesar d. 46 BC
C. Julius Caesar cos. AD 1	L. Julius Caesar	Agrippa Julius Caesar	Ti. Julius Caesar d. AD 37
Drusus Julius Caesar cos. AD 15, 21	Germanicus Julius Caesar cos. AD 12, 18
Ti. Julius Caesar; Nero (Gemellus)	Nero Julius Caesar; Germanicus d. AD 31	Drusus Julius Caesar; Germanicus d. AD 33	C. Julius Caesar Germanicus (Caligula) d. AD 41

Legend
Green	Consul	probable descent
Yellow	Dictator	speculative descent
Orange	Emperor	adoptive descent

== See also ==
- Julia gens

== Footnotes ==
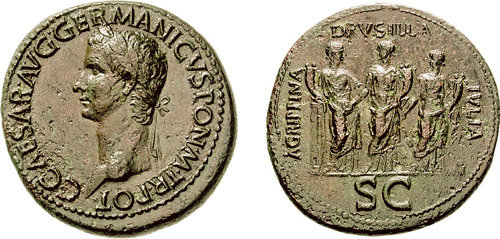
Sestertius bearing the likenesses of the emperor Gaius Julius Caesar Germanicus, better known as Caligula, and his sisters.

== Bibliography ==
- Wilhelm Drumann, Geschichte Roms in seinem Übergang von der republikanischen zur monarchischen Verfassung, oder: Pompeius, Caesar, Cicero und ihre Zeitgenossen, Königsberg (1834–1844).
- "Caesar", in Dictionary of Greek and Roman Biography and Mythology, William Smith, ed., Little, Brown and Company, Boston (1849).
- T. Robert S. Broughton, The Magistrates of the Roman Republic, American Philological Association (1952).
- Miriam Griffin, A Companion to Julius Caesar John Wiley & Sons (2009), ISBN 1444308459, ISBN 9781444308457.
- Suetonius, The Twelve Caesars.
