= Gaius Marcius Figulus =

Gaius Marcius Figulus was a name used by men of the Marcii Figuli. Two known members were:

- Gaius Marcius Figulus (consul 162 BC), twice consul, in 162 and 156 BC
- Gaius Marcius Figulus (consul 64 BC), consul in 64 BC
