= Julia Caesar =

Julia Caesar may refer to

- Any of the women of the Julii Caesares
- Julia Caesar (television), reporter for BBC News (TV channel)
- Julia Cæsar (1885–1971), a Swedish actress
