= Julia (wife of Marius) =

Roman lady (c. 130 BC – 69 BC)

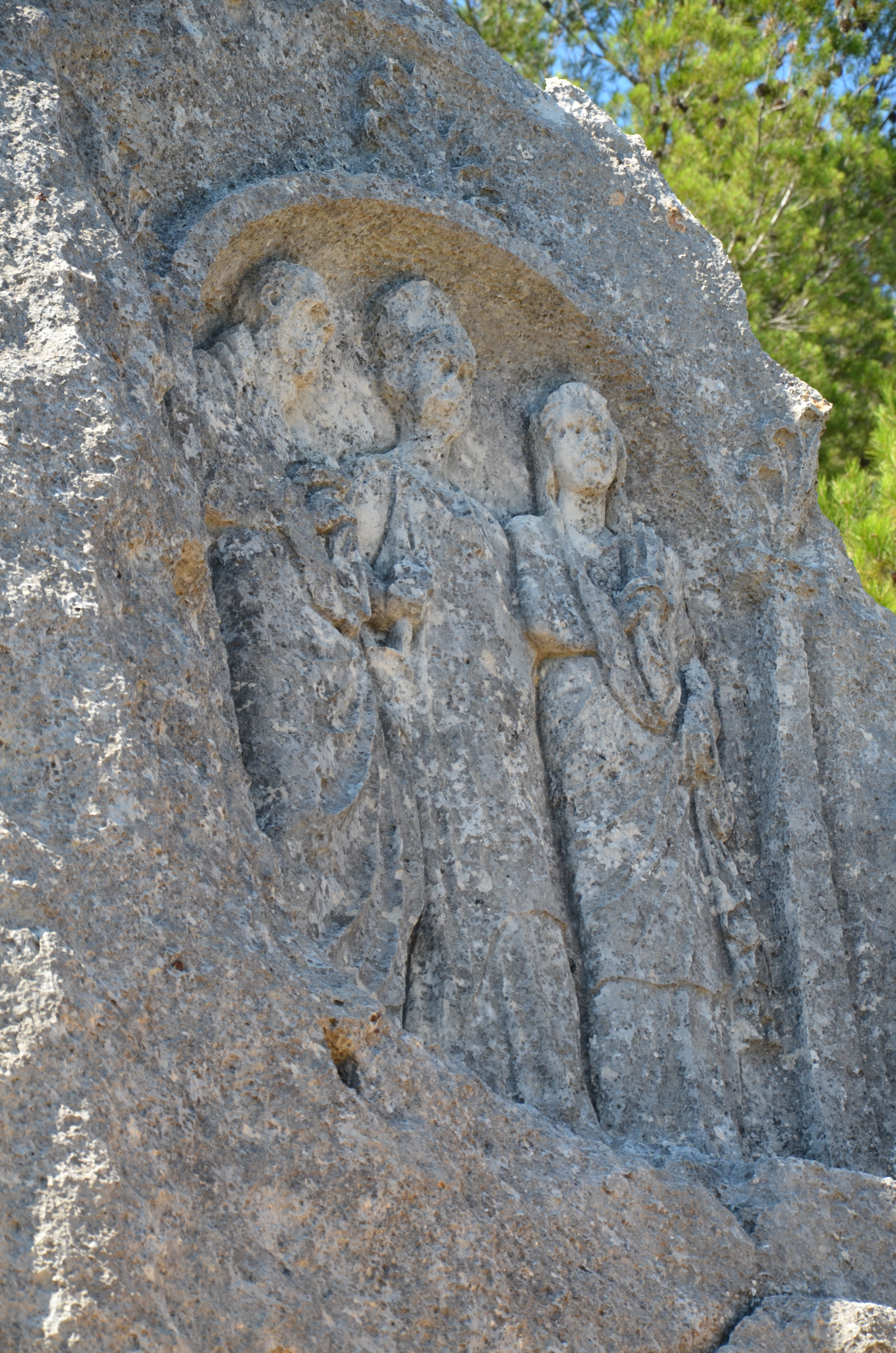
- This bas-relief named Les Trémaïé may depict Julia and her husband Marius
- Born: c. 130 BC
- Died: 69 BC (aged around 61)
- Known for: wife of Gaius Marius and aunt of Julius Caesar
- Spouse: Gaius Marius
- Children: Gaius Marius the Younger
- Parents: Gaius Julius Caesar (father); Marcia (mother)
- Family: Julii Caesares

Julia (c. 130 BC – 69 BC) was the wife of the Roman consul Gaius Marius and a paternal aunt of future Roman dictator Julius Caesar.

== Biography ==
Julia was the daughter of Gaius Julius Caesar and Marcia (daughter of praetor Quintus Marcius Rex). She was a sister of Gaius Julius Caesar (the father of Julius Caesar) and Sextus Julius Caesar, consul in 91 BC.

At about 110 BC she married Gaius Marius. They had a son, Gaius Marius the Younger. Plutarch also mentions that Marius had two step-sons named Quintus Granius and Gnaeus Granius; it is possible that these men were children of Julia by an earlier marriage or step-children of Marius from a marriage to another woman before Julia. If Quintus and Gnaeus were indeed Julia's sons, then her earlier husband was likely a member of the Campanian trading family since Julia was a patrician and would only have married someone from the Grania gens if they were very rich.

According to Plutarch, it was by marrying her, a patrician woman, that the upstart Marius got the attention of the snobbish Roman Senate and launched his political career. Julia is remembered as a virtuous woman devoted to her husband and their only child. Her reputation alone permitted her to keep her status, even after Sulla's persecutions against Marius himself and his allies.

Julia died in 69 BC and received a devoted funeral eulogy from her nephew Julius Caesar, before he left to serve under Gaius Antistius Vetus in Hispania Ulterior.

== See also ==
- Women of the Julii Caesares
- Julia gens
- Julii Caesares
- Julio-Claudian family tree

== Bibliography ==
- Münzer, Fredrich (1918). "Iulius 541" . Realencyclopädie der classischen Altertumswissenschaft (in German). Vol. 10, 1. Stuttgart: Butcher. col. 892 – via Wikisource.
- Plutarch (1919) [2nd century AD]. "Life of Caesar". Parallel Lives. Loeb Classical Library. Vol. 7. Translated by Perrin, Bernadotte. OCLC 40115288 – via LacusCurtius.
- Plutarch (1920) [2nd century AD]. "Life of Marius". Parallel Lives. Loeb Classical Library. Vol. 9. Translated by Perrin, Bernadotte. OCLC 40115288 – via Perseus Digital Library.
