= Sextus Julius =

Sextus Julius may refer to:

- Any Sextus Julius Caesar (disambiguation)
- Sextus Julius Frontinus, better known as Frontinus, author of treatises on aqueducts and military tactics
- Sextus Julius Major, proconsul of Africa AD 141–142
- Sextus Julius Severus, a Roman governor in the 2nd century AD
- Sextus Julius Saturninus, praenomen possibly Gaius, one of the usurpers of Gallienus
- Sextus Julius Africanus, a Christian traveller and historian of the late 2nd and early 3rd century AD
