= Lucius Julius =

Lucius Julius may refer to:

- Lucius Julius Iullus (consul)
- Lucius Julius Libo, Roman consul
- Lucius Julius Caesar (disambiguation)
- Lucius Julius Ursus Servianus, Roman consul
- Lucius Julius Gainius Fabius Agrippa
