= Lucius Julius Caesar (praetor 183 BC) =

Roman statesman

Lucius Julius Sex. f. L. n. Caesar was a member of the patrician house of the Julii Caesares at Ancient Rome, and held the office of praetor in 183 BC.

== Family ==
Lucius was the son of Sextus Julius Caesar, who had distinguished himself as praetor in 208 BC, during the Second Punic War. He had at least one brother, Sextus, who obtained the consulship in 157, and probably a second, Gaius, a senator who wrote a history of Rome in Greek about 143 BC.

Although it was common for the eldest son in a family to be named after his father, Lucius, apparently named after his grandfather, was probably the eldest brother. Following the cursus honorum, he was probably approaching forty years of age when he was elected praetor, and was probably born no later than 220 BC, while his brother, Sextus, first appears in history holding the rather junior post of military tribune in 181, and did not become consul for another twenty-four years after that. Further, Lucius had a son, also named Lucius, who was praetor in 166, and thus was probably born before 200; Sextus' son only obtained the praetorship in 123 BC.

== Career ==
Elected praetor for 183 BC, Lucius was assigned the province of Cisalpine Gaul. The senate gave him the task of preventing the Transalpine Gauls from building a city on the site of Aquileia, where they had begun to settle, but to do so without resorting to open hostilities. A Roman colony was planned for the location, and triumvirs were appointed for that purpose in the same year; thus Lucius played a crucial role in the founding of what would become one of the largest cities of classical antiquity.

== See also ==
- Julia (gens)

== Bibliography ==
- Titus Livius (Livy), Ab Urbe Condita (History of Rome), book xxxix.
- Wilhelm Drumann, Geschichte Roms in seinem Übergang von der republikanischen zur monarchischen Verfassung, oder: Pompeius, Caesar, Cicero und ihre Zeitgenossen, Königsberg (1834–1844).
- "Caesar" and "L. Julius Caesar" (no. 3), in the Dictionary of Greek and Roman Biography and Mythology, William Smith, ed., Little, Brown and Company, Boston (1849).
- T. Robert S. Broughton, The Magistrates of the Roman Republic, American Philological Association (1952).
