= Lucius Roscius Fabatus =

Ancient Roman politician

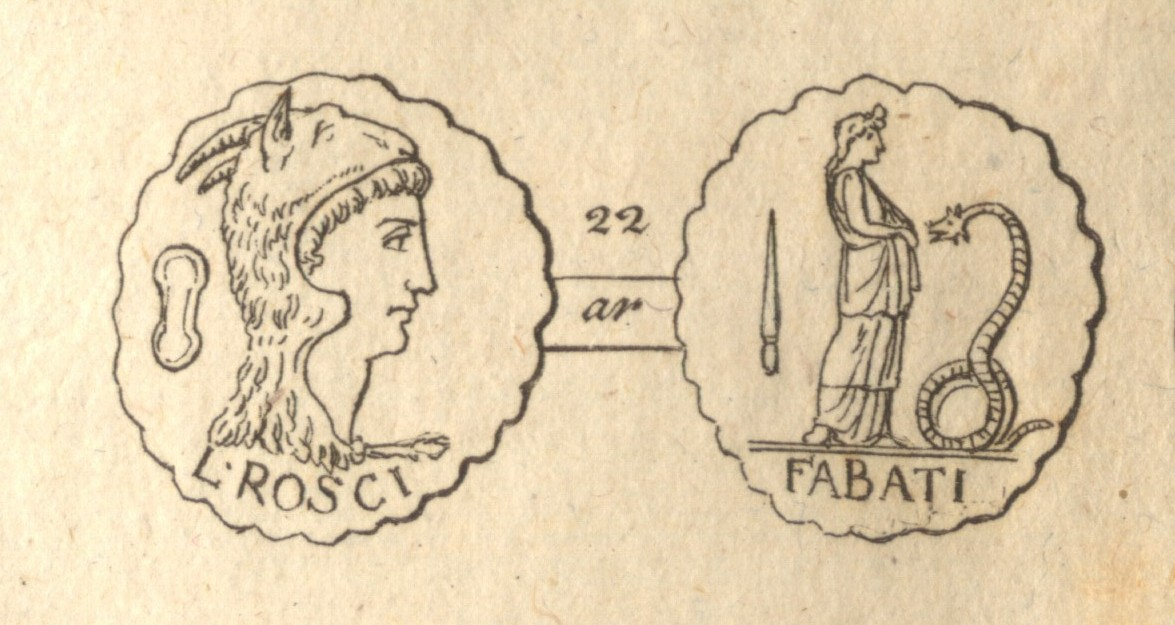
A coin bearing the name of Lucius Roscius Fabatus. It represents on the obverse the head of Juno Sospita, and the reverse refers to the worship of that goddess at Lanuvium.

Lucius Roscius Fabatus (c. 95–90 BC – April 43 BC) was a military officer and politician of the late Roman Republic.

Belonging to the plebeian gens Roscii, he was probably born around 95–90 BC in Lanuvium, a town in Latium known for its temple and cult of Juno Sospita. He began his political career (cursus honorum) as a moneyer in 64 BC. In 55 BC, he was elected tribune of the plebs and co-sponsored at least one law, the lex Mamilia Roscia Alliena Peducaea Fabia. Associated with the faction of the populares, he supported Julius Caesar.

He was a member of Caesar's staff in the Gallic Wars and was charged with various tasks, including commanding the Thirteenth Legion on the Lower Rhine, in the winter of 54 BC. It was during this winter that Ambiorix induced the Eburones and Nervii to attack in detail the quarters of the Roman legions, but in the operations resulting from their revolt Fabatus seems to have taken no part, since the district in which he was stationed remained quiet. He informed Caesar, however, about hostile movements in Armorica in the same winter.

After his service in Gaul, he supported Caesar in the Senate. Elected praetor in 49 BC, he sought to mediate between Caesar and his opponents in Caesar's Civil War. In 49 BC, he promulgated a law bearing his name, which gave full Roman citizenship to the populations of Cisalpine Gaul in Transpadania (the area north of the River Po). After Caesar crossed the Rubicon, Pompey sent Fabatus with Lucius Caesar and others from Rome to meet Caesar at Ariminum, with proposals of accommodation both public and private. Caesar charged Fabatus with counter-proposals, which he delivered to Pompey and the consuls at Capua. Caesar's opponents were willing to accept Caesar's proposals with substantial amendments, which Fabatus and L. Caesar reported to Caesar. Caesar rejected these amendments and Fabatus's missions did not prevent the escalation of the civil war.

After the assassination of Caesar, Fabatus took part in the ensuing civil wars. He was killed on 14 or 15 of April 43 BC in the Battle of Forum Gallorum between Mark Antony and the legions of the senate.
