= Lucius Julius Caesar (proquaestor) =

Roman military leader, partisan of Pompey

Lucius Julius Caesar (died 46 BC) was a politician in the late Roman Republic. He was the son of Lucius Julius Caesar (who was consul in 64 BC), and a member of the powerful patrician family Julii Caesares. He was a first cousin of Marcus Antonius.

== Biography ==
Lucius Julius Caesar was son of another Lucius Julius Caesar, who had been Roman consul in 64 BC, as well as a distant cousin of the dictator Gaius Julius Caesar. A Lucius Caesar is mentioned in 54 BC as one of the men contemplated to prosecute the governor of Sardinia, Marcus Aemilius Scaurus, for extortion. Lucius likely held the office of quaestor by 50 BC, meaning he will have become a senator. In January 49, Lucius Roscius Fabatus (a praetor) and L. Caesar arrived in Ariminum (modern Rimini) as open envoys to Caesar from Pompey. Caesar described L. Caesar as young (adulescens), and the statesman Cicero had a low opinion, calling him in a letter dated 23 January non hominem, sed scotas solutas ("not a man, but a broom untied"). He may have been chosen or volunteered for the task because of his kinship with Caesar. The envoys passed back and forth with counter-proposals, but no agreement was reached.

He next appears later in 49 as commander under Publius Attius Varus of a fleet of ten ships, charged with guarding the waters between Africa and Sicily. Threatened by the fleet of Gaius Scribonius Curio, he withdrew from Clupea (in modern Tunisia) to Hadrumetum (also in modern Tunisia), and then joined Pompey's land forces in Africa. According to Suetonius (writing about 170 years later), he behaved with great cruelty to those of Caesar's freedmen and slaves whom he captured, and even butchered the wild animals which had been captured for popular amusement in the circus.

In 46, he is recorded as being proquaestor (a military and magisterial office) under Marcus Porcius Cato in Utica (in modern Tunisia). After Cato's suicide, he surrendered Utica to Caesar. He was killed later that year, in unclear circumstances. Pompeians asserted that he had been killed at Caesar's instigation; but Julians retorted that not only was Caesar renowned for his clemency after victory, but that he had specifically granted L. Caesar mercy after his surrender. It may be that Caesar's soldiers, angered by the actions recounted by Suetonius, fell upon him.
