= Sextus Julius Caesar (consul 157 BC) =

Roman consul

- Citizenship: Ancient Rome
- Occupation: Consul
- Term: 157 BC
- Father: Sextus Julius Caesar (praetor 208 BC)

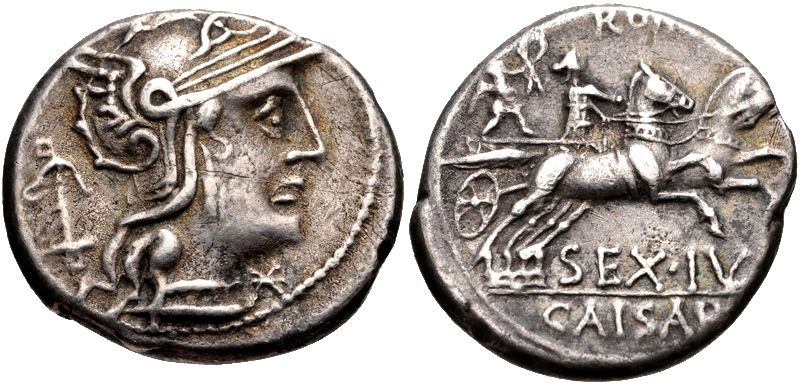
A denarius issued in 129 BC by Sextus Julius Caesar, probably the son of the consul

Sextus Julius Caesar was a Roman statesman, and the first member of the Julii Caesares to hold the consulship, which he attained in 157 BC.

== Family ==
From his filiation, we know that Sextus' father was also named Sextus, and that his grandfather was named Lucius. In his reconstruction of the family, classical scholar Wilhelm Drumann assumed that he was the son of Sextus Julius Caesar, one of the military tribunes of 181 BC, and the grandson of an otherwise unknown Lucius Julius Caesar, who would have been the son of Sextus, praetor in 208 BC. However, more recent scholarship has concluded that the military tribune and the consul were the same person, and that his father was the praetor of 208.

Sextus had at least one brother, Lucius, who was praetor in 183 BC, and probably a second, Gaius, who was a senator and the great-grandfather of Gaius Julius Caesar, the dictator. He had two sons: Sextus, who was praetor urbanus in 123 BC, and Lucius, by whom he was the grandfather of Lucius Julius Caesar, consul in 90 BC, and the orator Gaius Julius Caesar Strabo. Lucius, the consul of 90 BC, was the grandfather of Mark Antony, the triumvir.

== Career ==
In 181 BC, Sextus served as a military tribune under Lucius Aemilius Paullus Macedonicus, proconsul of Liguria. In 170, he was one of the legates sent to Thrace in order to restore liberty to the people of Abdera, and to seek out and return those who had been sold into slavery. In 165, Sextus was one of the curule aediles. At the Megalesian Games, he and his colleague, Gnaeus Cornelius Dolabella, gave the first, unsuccessful presentation of Terence's comedy, Hecyra. Sextus subsequently held the praetorship; the exact year is uncertain, but it was no later than 160.

In 157 BC, Sextus became the first of the Julii Caesares to obtain the consulship. His colleague was Lucius Aurelius Orestes. Their year of office was largely uneventful; Ariarathes, who had been deposed as King of Cappadocia the previous year, was at Rome seeking support for his subsequent restoration, and Sextus is named as a witness to a decree of the senate to the people of Tibur.

Ten years after their consulship, in 147 BC, Orestes was sent as part of an ambassadorial mission to arbitrate in a dispute between the Achaean League and the Lacedaemonians. Following the senate's instructions, he removed several important towns from the League, leading to riots at Corinth, and an attack on the ambassadors. In response, his former colleague was dispatched at the head of a second delegation with instructions to censure the Achaeans and continue negotiating the dispute. Sextus' attempt to resolve the dispute was frustrated by the Achaean general Critolaus. The following year, the League rose against Rome, and was decisively defeated in the Achaean War. The League was dissolved, and most of mainland Greece was incorporated into the Roman Republic.

== See also ==
- Julia gens

== Bibliography ==
- Titus Livius (Livy), Ab Urbe Condita (History of Rome), book xl.
- Gaius Plinius Secundus (Pliny the Elder), Naturalis Historia (Natural History), book xxxiii.
- Polybius, The Histories, book xxxii.
- Lucius Cassius Dio Cocceianus (Cassius Dio), Roman History, fragmenta.
- Wilhelm Drumann, Geschichte Roms in seinem Übergang von der republikanischen zur monarchischen Verfassung, oder: Pompeius, Caesar, Cicero und ihre Zeitgenossen, Königsberg (1834–1844).
- "Caesar" and "Sextus Julius Caesar" (nos. 4 & 6), in the Dictionary of Greek and Roman Biography and Mythology, William Smith, ed., Little, Brown and Company, Boston (1849).
- T. Robert S. Broughton, The Magistrates of the Roman Republic, American Philological Association (1952).
- The Cambridge Ancient History, Frank Adcock and S. A. Cook, eds., Cambridge University Press (1924–1939), vol. VIII.
