= Gaius Marcius Figulus (consul 64 BC) =

Consul of the Roman Republic

Gaius Marcius Figulus (fl. 1st century BC) was a consul of the Roman Republic in 64 BC.

== Biography ==
It is believed that Gaius Marcius Figulus was originally born "Gaius Minucius Thermus", before at some point being adopted by a Marcius Figulus. He was elected to the office of Praetor in around 67 BC. He was then elected consul alongside Lucius Julius Caesar in 64 BC. During his consulship, the Senate issued laws restricting the number of persons who accompanied candidates for election, as well as making a number of collegia illegal. After his consulship, he refused to be nominated for promagisterial or overseas proconsular appointment.

On December 5, 63 BC, Marcius Figulus was one of the ex-consulars who spoke in support of the use of capital punishment to be applied against the conspirators of Catiline. On the following day, he supported the proposal of a giving of thanks to Cicero for defending the Republic.

After his death, his family erected a tomb for him that was enormously expensive and elaborate.

== Sources ==
- Broughton, T. Robert S., The Magistrates of the Roman Republic, Vol. II (1951)
- Broughton, T. Robert S., The Magistrates of the Roman Republic, Vol. III (1986)
- Gruen, Erich S., The Last Generation of the Roman Republic (1995)

Political offices
Preceded by Lucius Aurelius Cotta and Lucius Manlius Torquatus	Consul of the Roman Republic; 64 BC with Lucius Julius Caesar (83 BC)	Succeeded by Marcus Tullius Cicero and Gaius Antonius Hybrida
