= Lucius Pinarius =

Roman governor

Lucius Pinarius Scarpus (flourished 1st century BC) was a Roman who lived during the late Republic and the early Empire. He served as the Roman governor of Cyrene, Libya during the War of Actium. He was originally loyal to Mark Antony, but eventually switched sides and joined Octavian following the latter's victory at the Battle of Actium in 31 BC.

== Life ==
According to Suetonius, Pinarius was a grandnephew of dictator Gaius Julius Caesar by one of his sisters, Julia Major. His cousins were the consul Quintus Pedius, Octavia Minor (the fourth wife of Triumvir Mark Antony), and Octavian (the future emperor Augustus). (Note: The German classical scholar Friedrich Münzer concluded that Scarpus was not the grandson but the son of Julia Major, and therefore a nephew of the dictator.)

His father was a member of the gens Pinaria, an ancient, distinguished family of patrician status. The family can be traced to the foundations of Rome. Various members of the gens served as priests and were among the first to serve as consuls in the republic.

Little is known about Scarpus' early life. He is first mentioned in the ancient sources when Caesar was assassinated in Rome in March 44 BC. In the will of Caesar, Scarpus received one eighth of the property of the dictator, the same amount as Pedius. The main heir of Caesar was Octavian, who received three quarters of the property of his great uncle. But Scarpus and Pedius also assigned their inheritance to Octavian.

Scarpus became an ally to Mark Antony and commanded him in the war against the murderers of Caesar, Marcus Junius Brutus and Gaius Cassius Longinus. In the years leading up to the War of Actium, in Actium, Greece 31 BC, Antony appointed Scarpus to the military command of Cyrenaica. Scarpus had with him four legions to command. During his time in Cyrenaica, Scarpus had control of the currency mint in Cyrene, as he became a moneyer. Scarpus had issued various coins bearing Antony's name and Scarpus’ name was inscribed as an issuer of those coins.

After Antony and his lover, the Ptolemaic Greek Queen Cleopatra VII of Egypt, were defeated by Octavian at Actium (September 2, 31 BC), they sailed back to North Africa. Antony sent messengers to Scarpus for help. But Scarpus refused to see Antony's messengers and put them to death. Instead, he changed sides. He gave his legions to Gaius Cornelius Gallus, Octavian's lieutenant, to command. While Octavian marched from the East through Asia, Syria and Judea against Egypt, Cornelius Gallus advanced with Scarpus’ legions from the west against Alexandria.

When Antony and Cleopatra died, Octavian became the new Roman master and then emperor. Augustus had appointed his cousin as the Roman governor of Cyrenaica. Scarpus, as he did for Antony, became a moneyer and issued various coins bearing Augustus’ name. On these coins, Scarpus had his name inscribed as an issuer of the coins. Beyond that, nothing is known of Scarpus.

== In fiction ==
Lucius Pinarius is the protagonist in the last part of Steven Saylor's book Roma. The book follows the known facts of his life but adds many episodes not attested in historical sources. As depicted in the book, on the last evening of his life Julius Caesar had a long personal talk with Pinarius (then seventeen years old), telling of his plans for conquest of Parthia and beyond and promising Pinarius a share in the greater Roman Empire which Caesar envisaged. On the following day, while visiting the house of Brutus, Pinarius discovered the plot to kill Caesar, and ran as fast as he could in order to warn him - but arrived just too late, only in time to see Caesar being actually assassinated. In a later part, Saylor depicts Pinarius as being secretly in love with Cleopatra and - wanting to spare her humiliation and degradation at the hands of the victorious Augustus - providing her with the asp with which she committed suicide.

== See also ==
- Pinaria gens

== Sources ==
- Suetonius, The Lives of the Twelve Caesars, Caesar
- Ancientlibrary.com^{[usurped]}
- Wildwinds.com
