= Nero Julius Caesar =

Heir to Roman emperor Tiberius (died AD 31)

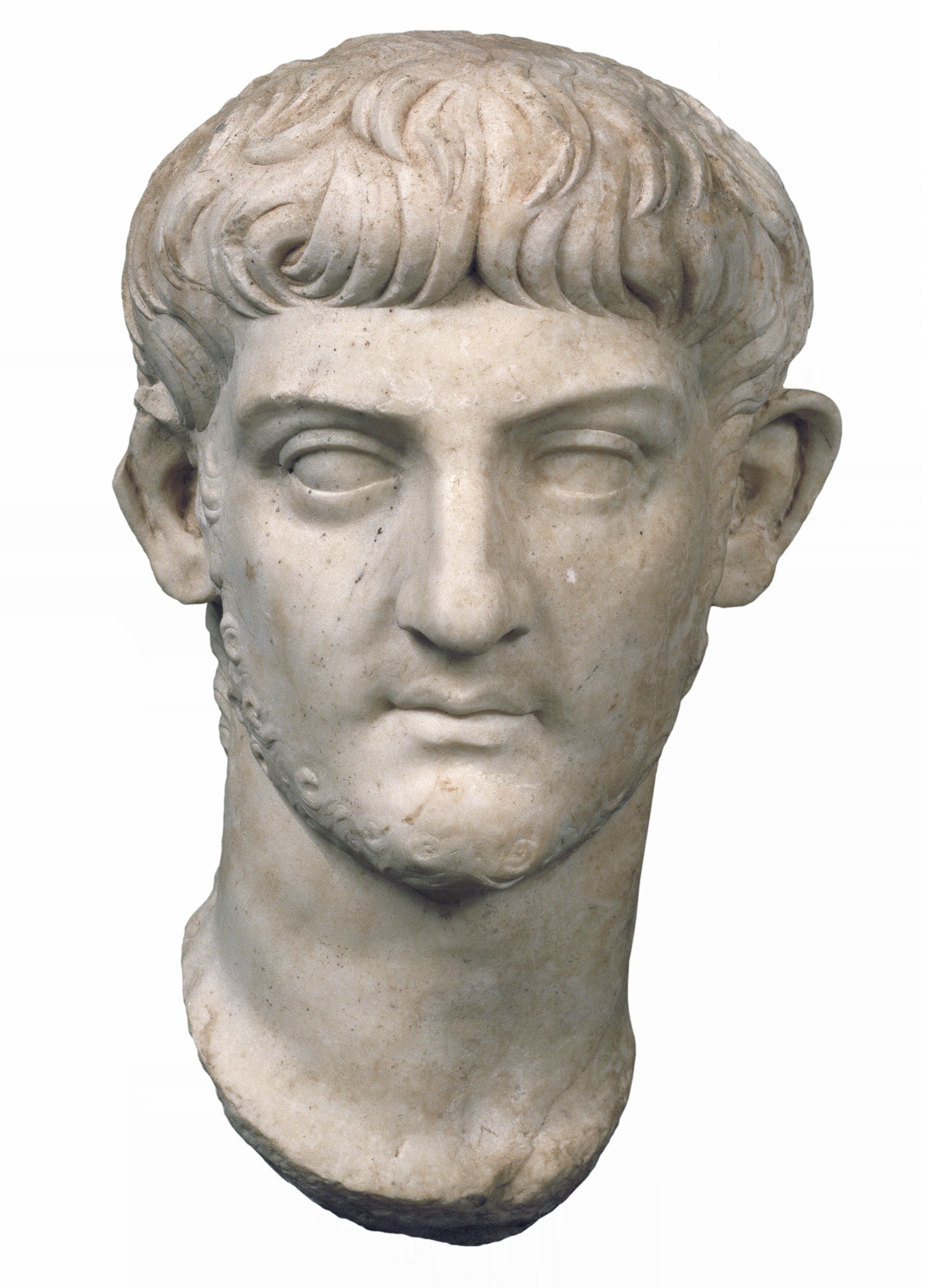
- Nero Julius Caesar, National Archaeological Museum of Tarragona
- Born: 17 January 6 AD; Italy
- Died: 31 AD (aged 24/25); Ponza
- Spouse: Julia Livia
- Dynasty: Julio-Claudian
- Father: Germanicus
- Mother: Agrippina the Elder

Nero Julius Caesar (17 January 6 AD – 31 AD) was the adopted grandson and heir of the Roman emperor Tiberius, alongside his brother Drusus. Born into the prominent Julio-Claudian dynasty, Nero was the son of Tiberius' general and heir, Germanicus. After the deaths of his father and of Tiberius' son, Drusus the Younger, Nero and his brother Drusus were adopted together by Tiberius in September AD 23. As a result of being heirs of the emperor, he and his brother enjoyed accelerated political careers.

Sejanus, prefect of the Praetorian Guard, had become powerful in Rome and is believed by ancient writers such as Suetonius and Tacitus to have been responsible for the downfall of Drusus the Younger. As the power of Sejanus grew, other members of the imperial family began to fall as well. In AD 29, Tiberius wrote a letter to the Senate attacking Nero and his mother, and the Senate had them both exiled. Two years later, he died in exile on the island of Ponza. His brother Drusus also died in exile in AD 33. Their deaths allowed for the adoption and ascension of their younger brother, Caligula, following the death of Tiberius in AD 37.

== Background and family ==
Nero was born around January 17 AD 6 to Germanicus and Agrippina the Elder. Nero's paternal grandparents were Nero Claudius Drusus (Drusus the Elder) and Antonia Minor, daughter of Mark Antony and Octavia Minor. His maternal grandparents were Marcus Vipsanius Agrippa, a close friend of Augustus, and Augustus' daughter Julia the Elder. Nero had eight siblings: four brothers (Tiberius and Gaius Julius, who died young; Drusus Caesar; and Gaius, nicknamed "Caligula"), three sisters (Agrippina the Younger, Julia Drusilla, and Julia Livilla) and a brother or sister of unknown name (normally referenced as Ignotus).

As a member of the Julio-Claudian dynasty, he was a close relative of all five Julio-Claudian emperors: his great-grandfather Augustus was the first emperor of the dynasty, his great-uncle Tiberius was the second emperor, his brother Gaius (Caligula) was the third emperor, his uncle Claudius was the fourth emperor, and his nephew Lucius Domitius (Nero) was the fifth and final emperor of the dynasty.

Nero's father was the adopted son of Tiberius, who was himself the adoptive son of Augustus, whose adoptions were the result of the death of Gaius Caesar in February AD 4. Gaius, who was the heir of Augustus, had died of illness in Syria. Germanicus was for some time considered the new heir by Augustus, but Augustus later decided in favour of his stepson Tiberius. As a result, in June AD 4, Augustus adopted Tiberius on the condition that Tiberius first adopt Germanicus. As a corollary to the adoption, Germanicus was wed to his second cousin Agrippina the Elder the following year.

In AD 13 Nero's father was appointed commander of the forces on the Rhine, from where he led three campaigns into Germania against the forces of Arminius. His victories against the German tribes which had made him popular as he avenged the Roman defeat at the Battle of Teutoburg Forest. In October AD 14, Germanicus received a delegation from the Senate giving their condolences for the death of Augustus. Augustus had died in August and Tiberius became emperor, making Germanicus heir to the empire. At the direction of Tiberius, Germanicus was dispatched to Asia to reorganize the provinces and assert imperial authority there. However, after two years in the east, Germanicus came into conflict with the governor of Syria, Gnaeus Calpurnius Piso. During their feud, Germanicus fell ill and died in October AD 19.

While Nero's father was alive he had been betrothed to the daughter of Creticus Silanus, the one-time governor of Syria. However, in AD 20, Nero married Julia Livia, daughter of Livilla and Drusus the Younger (Tiberius' only son by Vipsania Agrippina).

== Career ==
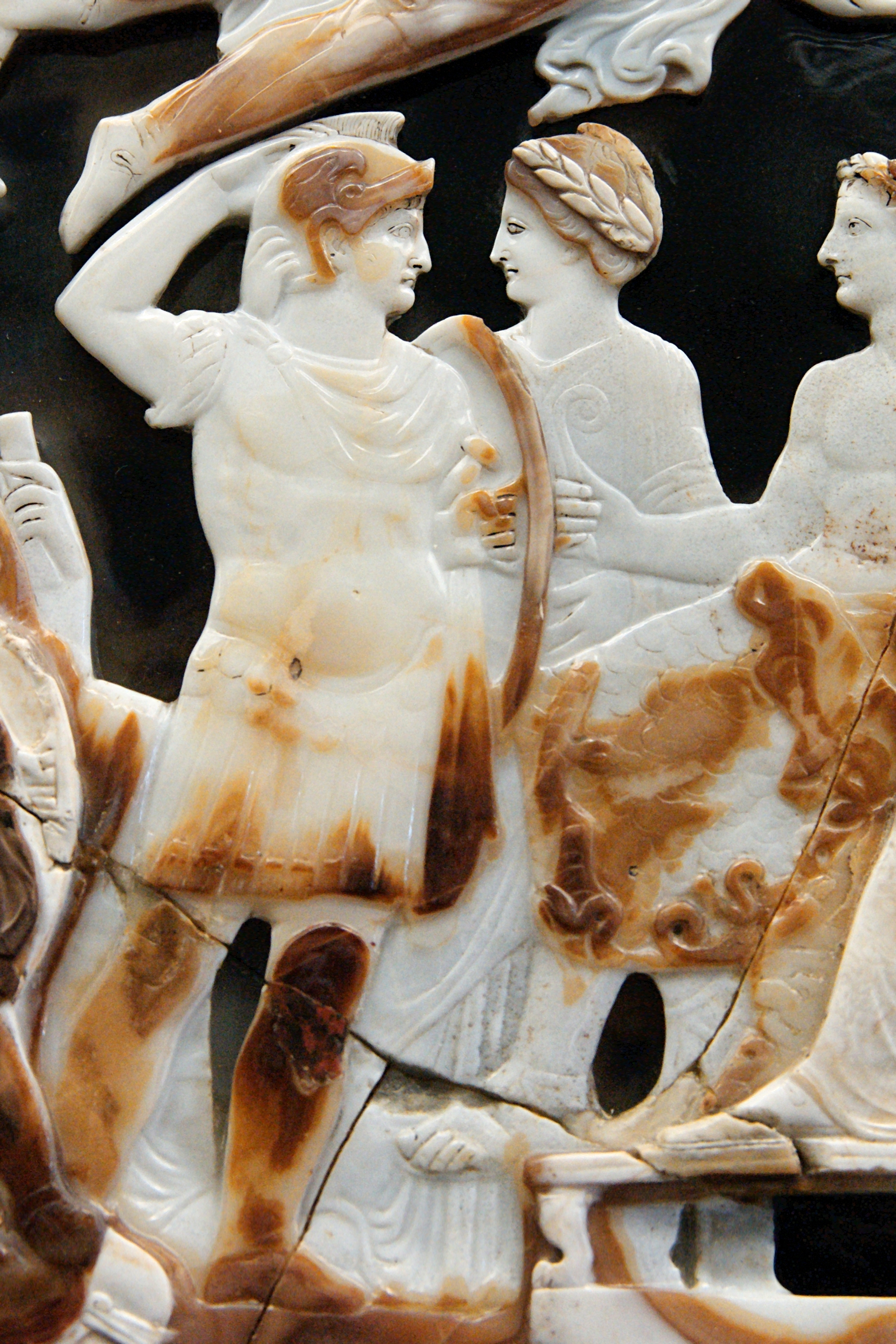
Nero (on the left), saluting Tiberius (seated, on the right) (detail of the Great Cameo of France).

Nero's mother Agrippina believed her husband was murdered to promote Drusus the Younger as heir, and feared that the birth of his twin sons would give him a motive to displace her own sons. However, her fears were unfounded, with Nero being elevated by Tiberius. On 7 June AD 20, Nero was brought into the forum to receive the toga virilis, introduced into the Senate by Tiberius and Drusus the Younger, and was promised the office of quaestor in five years' time. He was excused from holding the lowest magistracy, the vigintivirate, and a congiaria of 60 denarii was distributed by Tiberius at his tirocinium. He was wed to Drusus the Younger's daughter, Julia, later that year combining the families of both possible lines of succession (that of Germanicus and Drusus the Younger). His brother Drusus was introduced to the Senate with similar honours in AD 23, and he too was promised the rank of quaestor in five years' time.

=== Heir to the principate ===
Following the death of Germanicus, Drusus the Younger was Tiberius' new heir. At the same time, Praetorian Prefect Sejanus started to exert considerable influence over the emperor, who referred to Sejanus as Socius Laborum ("my partner in my toils"). Around AD 20, when Sejanus became the first of the equestrian order to hold the praetorship, a senatorial office, his daughter Aelia Junilla was born and swiftly betrothed to Nero's cousin, the boy Claudius Drusus, firstborn son of the future emperor Claudius. At the prospect of a familial bond between the Claudia gens and Sejanus's family, Drusus the Younger is reported by Tacitus to have said of Sejanus in disgust "the grandsons of us Drususes will be his grandsons too". (Latin: communis tili cum familia Drusorum fore nepotes.) According to Tacitus and Cassius Dio, the Younger Drusus and Sejanus began bickering and entered a feud. Subsequently, Drusus became ill and died of seemingly natural causes on 14 September AD 23. Claudius Drusus also died before reaching adulthood. Ancient sources suggested that the cause of Drusus' death was poison, whereas modern authors like Barbara Levick are more sceptical, suggesting it may have been illness.

The death of the Younger Drusus left no immediate threat to Sejanus. Ultimately, his death elevated Nero and his brother Drusus to the position of heirs. In effect, this led to the formation of factions, with one faction around Nero and Drusus and their mother Agrippina and the other faction linked to Sejanus. While the full extent of Sejanus' power at this point is uncertain, it can be noted that Sejanus was not allowed to marry Livilla (Drusus the Younger's widow) and was thus denied entry into the imperial family. In the Senate, Sejanus encountered little opposition from the senators, but Tiberius expressed displeasure in the Senate, in AD 24, at the public prayers which had been offered for Nero and his brother Drusus' health.

In AD 28, the Senate voted that altars to Clementia (mercy) and Amicitia (friendship) be raised. At that time, Clementia was considered a virtue of the ruling class, for only the powerful could give clemency. The altar of Amicitia was flanked by statues of Sejanus and Tiberius. By this time, Sejanus' association with Tiberius had reached the point where members of Roman society would make prayers and sacrifices and erect statues in his honour. Sejanus' birthday was honoured as if he were a member of the imperial family. According to the author and historian Richard Alston, "Sejanus' association with Tiberius must have at least indicated to the people that he would be further elevated".

=== Downfall ===
The very next year saw a direct attack on Agrippina and Nero. Tiberius sent a letter to the Senate in which he accused Agrippina and Nero of misconduct, but was unable to convict them of any attempt at rebellion. The attitude of the former and the sexual activity of the latter were the primary accusations against them. Agrippina was popular with the people, as was the family of Germanicus, and the people surrounded the senate-house carrying likenesses of the two in protest against Tiberius. The Senate refused to come to a resolution on the matter until it received a clear direction from the emperor to do so. Tiberius found it necessary to repeat his charges, and when he did, the Senate no longer delayed; the fate of Agrippina and Nero was sealed. Nero was declared an enemy of the state, removed to the island of Pontia, and was killed or encouraged to kill himself in AD 31. According to Suetonius, he put an end to his own life when the executioner appeared before him with the instruments of death.

== Post mortem ==
His brother Drusus was later also exiled on similar charges of sexual misdemeanours. Sejanus remained powerful until his sudden downfall and summary execution in October AD 31, just after the death of Nero. The specific reasons for his downfall remain unclear. Alston suggests that Sejanus may have been doing a favour for Tiberius by removing Germanicus' family from power, noting that Agrippina and Nero's brother Drusus were left in exile even after Sejanus' death.

The deaths of Germanicus' oldest sons elevated his third son, Gaius Caesar (Caligula), to successor and he became princeps when Tiberius died in AD 37. Drusus the Younger's son Tiberius Gemellus was summoned to Capri by his grandfather Tiberius, where he and Gaius Caligula were made joint-heirs. When Caligula assumed power, he made Gemellus his adopted son, but Caligula soon had Gemellus killed for plotting against him.

In AD 37, Nero's bones were returned to Rome and interred at the Mausoleum of Augustus by Caligula.

== Ancestry ==
Ancestry of Nero Julius Caesar

8. Tiberius Claudius Nero
4. Nero Claudius Drusus
9. Livia Drusilla
2. Germanicus
10. Mark Antony
5. Antonia Minor
11. Octavia Minor
1. Nero Julius Caesar Germanicus
12. Lucius Vipsanius
6. Marcus Vipsanius Agrippa
3. Agrippina the Elder
14. Augustus
7. Julia the Elder
15. Scribonia

== See also ==
- Julio-Claudian family tree

== Bibliography ==
=== Primary sources ===
- Cassius Dio, Roman History Book 58, English translation
- Suetonius, Lives of the Twelve Caesars, Life of Tiberius, Latin text with English translation
- Tacitus, Annals, I–IV, English translation

=== Secondary sources ===
- Adams, Geoff W. (2007), The Roman Emperor Gaius "Caligula" and His Hellenistic Aspirations, BrownWalker Press, ISBN 9781599424231
- Bartsch, Shadi (2017), The Cambridge Companion to the Age of Nero, Cambridge University Press, ISBN 9781107052208
- Alston, Richard (1998), Aspects of Roman History AD 14–117, Routledge, ISBN 0-415-13236-3
- Bingham, Sandra J. (1999), The praetorian guard in the political and social life of Julio-Claudian Rome, Ottawa: National Library of Canada, ISBN 0612271064
- Bunson, Mathew (2014), Encyclopedia of the Roman Empire, Infobase Publishing, ISBN 9781438110271
- Levick, Barbara (1999), Tiberius the Politician, Routledge, ISBN 0-415-21753-9
- Lott, J. Bert (2012), Death and Dynasty in Early Imperial Rome: Key Sources, with Text, Translation, and Commentary, Cambridge University Press, ISBN 978-0-521-86044-4
- Rowe, Greg (2002), Princes and Political Cultures: The New Tiberian Senatorial Decress, University of Michigan Press, ISBN 0472112309
- Salisbury, Joyce E. (2001), Women in the ancient world, ABC-CLIO, ISBN 978-1-57607-092-5
- Seager, Robin (2005), Tiberius, Blackwell Publishing, ISBN 1-4051-1529-7
- Shotter, David (1992), Tiberius Caesar, London: Routledge, ISBN 978-0-203-62502-6
- Swan, Michael Peter (2004), The Augustan Succession: An Historical Commentary on Cassius Dio's Roman History, Oxford University Press, ISBN 0-19-516774-0
- This article incorporates text from a publication now in the public domain: Smith, William, ed. (1880). "Nero". Dictionary of Greek and Roman Biography and Mythology. Vol. 2. pp. 1166–1167.
- Rose, Charles Brian, Dynastic Commemoration and Imperial Portraiture in the Julio-Claudian Period. Cambridge, 1997, nr. 17, pp. 66–67.
