= Tiberius Claudius Drusus (son of Claudius) =

Eldest son of the future Roman Emperor Claudius

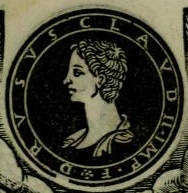
- 1517 illustration of a coin of Drusus
- Born: c. AD 9–12
- Died: c. AD 20–27 (age unknown; "died just before he came to manhood")
- Dynasty: Julio-Claudian
- Father: Claudius
- Mother: Plautia Urgulanilla

Tiberius Claudius Drusus (c. AD 9/12 – 20/27) was the eldest son of the Roman Emperor Claudius with his first wife Plautia Urgulanilla. He had one younger sister, Claudia, who was repudiated by Claudius along with Plautia.

== Background ==
Tiberius Claudius Drusus' grandfather was Marcus Plautius Silvanus and his great-grandmother was Urgulania. Livia, the future emperor Claudius’ grandmother and the wife of the emperor Augustus, is presumed to have helped her friend Urgulania to arrange the marriage of Claudius and Plautia Urgulanilla when her grandson was around 18. Claudius married Plautia Urgulanilla sometime between 9 and 12 AD. Tiberius Claudius Drusus was born soon after the marriage, decades before his father became emperor. Throughout most of his life, the emperor was his relative Tiberius, son of Livia.

== Life ==
Some five months after his daughter Claudia Julia was born, Claudius divorced Plautia on suspicion of adultery and complicity in the murder of Apronia, her brother's wife, who had been pushed from a window. The divorce may have been as early as 20 to as late as AD 27. Claudius disowned Claudia Julia by exposing her on Urgulanilla's doorstep, believing her to be fathered by a freedman of his, but he did not dispute the paternity of his son Claudius Drusus, leaving the boy Claudius's only son at the time. A marble statue of Claudius Drusus was installed in the Sebasteion of Aphrodisias, an augusteum temple dedicated to the cult of the divine emperors and their family; its inscribed base was uncovered during archaeological excavations there in the late twentieth century.

Claudius Drusus was betrothed to Aelia Junilla, the only daughter of Lucius Aelius Sejanus, the commander of the Praetorian Guard. In AD 20 Sejanus was reaching the height of his power, and the birth of his daughter offered an opportunity to connect his own family with the imperial Julio-Claudian dynasty. This betrothal filled Sejanus, then just a prefect, with unfulfilled hopes. The Roman historian Tacitus wrote that the people were not satisfied with this match as they were with the betrothal of Claudius Drusus's cousin, Nero Caesar, son of the popular general Germanicus Julius Caesar. Probably it was felt the nobility of the family (nobilitas familiae) was to be polluted; Sejanus was not of senatorial rank and his appointment as a praetor in AD 20 was an unprecedented novelty. Claudius Drusus was ultimately never married to Aelia Junilla, who may have only been born in the year of their betrothal. According to Tacitus:

additar pontificatus et quo primam die forum ingressas est congiarium plebi admodum laetae quod Germanici stirpem iam puberem aspiciebat. auctum dehinc gaudium nuptiis Neronis et Iuliae Drusi filiae. utque haec secando rumore ita adversis animis acceptum quod filio Claudii socer Seianus destinaretur. polluisse nobilitatem familiae videbatur suspectumque iam nimiae spei Seianum ultra extulisse.

— Tacitus, Annales III.29
Translation:

Their delight to see a son of Germanicus already growing up was increased by his marriage with Drusus' daughter (Livia Julia). But that good news was counterbalanced by their dissatisfaction at the betrothal of Claudius' son to the daughter of Sejanus. This was felt to depreciate the nobility of the imperial house, while exalting Sejanus even beyond the excessive hopes which suspicion attributed to him.

== Coinage ==
Probably in honour of the occasion of his betrothal to Aelia Junilla, an issue of coins is known to have been minted at Myrina in Aeolis, on the coast of Asia Minor. Myrina was of little importance at the time, and had comparatively little involvement in the imperial cult. However, in AD 17, the region suffered a major earthquake, and Myrina was one of twelve cities to receive funds for reconstruction from the Fiscus, the imperial treasury, as well as five years' tax remission from the Roman Senate. It is therefore likely that the coins, of which five examples are known to exist, were issued at a time of substantial gratitude towards Tiberius.

The obverse of the bronze coins shows a draped bust of Claudius Drusus facing to the right with the legend written clockwise in Koine Greek: ΤΙ ΚΛΑΥΔΙΟϹ ΔΡΟΥϹΟϹ, romanized: Ti. Klaudios Drousos. On the reverse is a wreathed head of Apollo, together with a lyre and the name of the Myrina mint, written anti-clockwise: ΜΥΡΙΝΑΙΩΝ, Myrinaiōn.

== Death ==
The year of Claudius Drusus's death is not precisely known. The Roman historian Suetonius's account suggests he died in AD 20, but Tacitus's Annales suggests he was still alive in AD 23, when, according to Tacitus the emperor Tiberius's son Drusus the Younger said of Sejanus in disgust "the grandsons of us Drususes will be his grandsons too". (Latin: communis illi cum familia Drusorum fore nepotes.) This suggests that Claudius Drusus was still due to marry Sejanus's daughter. Subsequently, it was suspected that Claudius Drusus had been murdered by Sejanus, but Suetonius did not believe that. Instead Suetonius said he had choked to death on a pear he had thrown into the air. According to him, Claudius Drusus;

prope iam puberem amisit piro per lusum in sublime iactato et hiatu oris excepto strangulatum, cum ei ante paucos dies filiam Seiani despondisset. Quo magis miror fuisse qui traderent fraude a Seiano nectatum.

— Suetonius, Vita Divi Claudii XXVII.1
Translation:

died just before he came to manhood, choked by a pear which he had playfully thrown up and caught in his open mouth; since he had been betrothed, only a few days previously, to Sejanus' daughter, the rumor that Sejanus murdered him becomes still less plausible.

== Legacy ==
Upon the death of his mother's brother Publius Plautius Pulcher during Claudius' reign, his funeral epitaph mentions that he was Drusus' uncle, possibly implying closeness between the two.
