= Sextus Julius Caesar (praetor 208 BC) =

Roman praetor in 208 BC

Sextus Julius Caesar was a Roman praetor in 208 BC, during the Second Punic War. He is thought to be the ancestor of all of the later Julii Caesares who appear in history, such as Roman dictator Julius Caesar and emperor Augustus.

== Family ==
Sextus is the earliest member of the Julii Caesares whose name is found in historical sources. From the filiation of his son, Sextus, we know that his father's name was Lucius, but it is not known whether his father bore the surname of Caesar. At least some scholars have proposed that this Lucius was the son of Lucius Julius Libo, consul in 267 BC.

Sextus appears to have had at least two children: Lucius, who was praetor in 183 BC, and Sextus, who served as military tribune in 181, and attained the consulship in 157. In his reconstruction of the Julii Caesares, classical scholar Wilhelm Drumann assumed that the consul was the son of the military tribune, rather than the same man, and therefore inserted an otherwise unknown Lucius between Sextus the praetor and his two sons; but since the tribune and the consul are identical, the consul's grandfather Lucius must have been the father of Sextus, praetor in 208.

It is likely that the praetor had a third son, Gaius, who was a senator, and is said to have written a Roman history in Greek about 143 BC. This son was probably the great-grandfather of Gaius Julius Caesar, the dictator, whose father and grandfather were also named Gaius.

== Career ==
Elected praetor in 208 BC, Sextus was assigned the province of Sicily, and given the command of the legiones Cannenses, legions formed from the survivors of the Battle of Cannae. A great calamity befell the Roman forces when the consuls Marcus Claudius Marcellus and Titus Quinctius Crispinus, who were scouting Hannibal's position, fell into a trap, and Marcellus was slain.

Gravely wounded, Crispinus was unable to return to Rome in order to hold the elections for the following year, and accordingly the senate dispatched Sextus Julius Caesar and two other envoys to meet with him, and urge the consul to appoint a dictator for the purpose of holding the elections. Crispinus nominated Titus Manlius Torquatus, who oversaw the election of new magistrates, but Crispinus himself died from his wounds before the end of the year.

== See also ==
- Julia (gens)

== Bibliography ==
- Titus Livius (Livy), Ab Urbe Condita (The History of Rome from the Founding of the City).
- Wilhelm Drumann, Geschichte Roms in seinem Übergang von der republikanischen zur monarchischen Verfassung, oder: Pompeius, Caesar, Cicero und ihre Zeitgenossen, Königsberg (1834–1844).
- "Sex. Julius Caesar" (no. 1), in the Dictionary of Greek and Roman Biography and Mythology, William Smith, ed., Little, Brown and Company, Boston (1849).
- T. Robert S. Broughton, The Magistrates of the Roman Republic, American Philological Association (1952).
- Miriam Griffin, A Companion to Julius Caesar John Wiley & Sons (2009), ISBN 1444308459 ISBN 9781444308457.
