= Lucius Julius Caesar (consul 64 BC) =

Roman consul in 64 BC and augur

Lucius Julius Caesar (fl. 1st century BC) was a Roman politician and senator who was consul in 64 BC. A supporter of his distant cousin, the Roman dictator Gaius Julius Caesar, Lucius was a key member of the senatorial coalition which strove to avoid civil war between the Senate and his nephew Mark Antony in the aftermath of Caesar's assassination in 44 BC.

== Early life ==
A member of the patrician Julii Caesares, Lucius Julius Caesar was the son of the homonymous consul of 90 BC and Fulvia. Lucius had a sister named Julia who was the wife of Marcus Antonius Creticus, with whom she had several children, among them Mark Antony. After her first husband's death Julia married Publius Cornelius Lentulus Sura.

== Early career ==
He began his political career serving as quaestor in Asia in 77 BC, probably under Terentius Varro. By 69 BC, Lucius had been elected augur, and by the end of 67 BC, he had served in the office of praetor.

Lucius Caesar was then elected consul for 64 BC, serving alongside Gaius Marcius Figulus. During his consulship, senatorial decrees were passed which limited the number of attendants who could accompany candidates during election campaigns. Action was also taken that year against certain guilds and societies deemed subversive and prohibited celebration of the ludi Compitalicii. During the following year (63 BC), he, together with his cousin Gaius Julius Caesar, was appointed duumviri perduellionis for the purpose of bringing the senator Gaius Rabirius to trial for perduellio committed during Saturninus' riot in 100 BC.

Later that same year, during the Catilinarian conspiracy, the senate met after discovery of a plot within the city and apprehension of conspirators. Among them was Lucius' brother-in-law Publius Cornelius Lentulus Sura, whom Lucius denounced. At a later meeting on the urban conspirators' fate, Lucius was among the former consuls who voted for the death penalty.

Lucius is believed by modern scholars to have served as censor in 61 BC based on an inscription from 58 BC in Delos.

== Caesar's civil war ==
In 52 BC, Lucius was serving as a legate under his cousin, Gaius Julius Caesar in Gaul. As befitting his status as a former consul, Lucius was placed in charge of Gallia Narbonensis; commanding 10,000 men, he was responsible for ensuring that the rebellion of Vercingetorix did not spread into Narbonese Gaul. After the suppression of the rebellion, he remained a legate through until 49 BC. Lucius Caesar was then caught up in the events of the civil war, as the Senate, under the influence of Marcus Porcius Cato, demanded that his cousin Gaius give up his armies and his imperium when his proconsular command came to an end. Gaius refused and, taking his cousin Lucius with him, crossed the Rubicon. In the civil war which followed, the two Caesars were allied. After the majority of the Senate fled Rome, Lucius remained in the capital while his cousin Gaius fought against the armies led by Gnaeus Pompeius Magnus.

During the next two years he remained in Rome, shoring up political support for Gaius, while he campaigned in Spain, and Greece. After the Battle of Pharsalus, Gaius was appointed dictator, and he proceeded to transfer some of his veteran legions to Italy. However, the legions became mutinous, forcing Mark Antony, the Master of the Horse, to leave Rome to deal with them in 47 BC. In an unprecedented procedure, Antonius appointed Lucius as praefectus urbi, with orders to keep Rome secure while Antonius was absent. Lucius proved unable to prevent Rome from falling into turmoil.

== Mutina campaign and efforts for peace ==
Gaius Julius Caesar's assassination in 44 BC created an unstable atmosphere throughout the Roman Republic. Desperate to remain neutral as the disputes between the Caesarean faction and the liberatores worsened, Lucius Julius Caesar retired to Neapolis. This retirement was brief, as Lucius returned to Rome before the end of the year.

He openly joined Cicero's senatorial faction, leading the Senate in repealing Antony's agrarian law. However, he did not utterly abandon his nephew, as he refused to allow for a state of civil war to be declared against Antony. More than anything else, he sought to avoid another civil war, and worked toward reconciling the various factions. Some time in the year, he was appointed princeps senatus after the title was revived. In early March of 43 BC, he was one of five ex-consuls appointed by the Senate to form a second delegation to Antony, seeking to arrange a truce between Mark Antony and Decimus Brutus Albinus. However, when two of the ex-consuls decided to withdraw from the delegation (Cicero and Publius Servilius Vatia Isauricus), the embassy was disbanded.

Later, after Antony had suffered a number of military setbacks, Lucius Caesar was one of the first to state that his nephew should be declared an enemy of the state. He was however to regret this when the Second Triumvirate was formed: as a consequence of his actions, Antony had him proscribed. Fleeing to his sister's (Antony's mother's) house, Lucius remained there until she obtained a pardon for him from her son. Lucius Caesar was still alive in 40 BC, when he was recorded as still being active as an augur.

== Family ==
Lucius likely had several sons, one named Lucius is known, and another named Sextus is also likely to have existed. Besides these there is also a Gnaeus Julius L.f. attested on coinage from Cordova who might have been his son. The use of the praenomen "Gnaeus", which was rare among the Julii, and possibly unique among the Caesars, might indicate that the man was a fourth son of Lucius, who had to use an unusual praenomen because the traditional three (Gaius, Sextus, and Lucius) were already in use by older brothers at the time of Gnaeus birth. Lucius is also generally believed by modern scholars to be the man honored along with a daughter named Julia at Ilium around 61 BC. No wife of Lucius is known.

== Sources ==
- Broughton, T. Robert S. (1952). The Magistrates of the Roman Republic. Vol. II.
- Broughton, T. Robert S. (1986). The Magistrates of the Roman Republic. Vol. III.
- Holmes, Rice T. (1923). The Roman Republic and the Founder of the Empire. Vol. III.
- Smith, William. "11. L. julius L. f. L. n. caesar". Dictionary of Greek and Roman Biography and Mythology. Vol. 1. p. 538. Archived from the original on 2011-06-05 – via The Ancient Library.
- Zmeskal, Klaus (2009). Adfinitas (in German). Vol. 1. Passau: Verlag Karl Stutz. ISBN 978-3-88849-304-1.

Political offices
Preceded by L. Aurelius Cotta; L. Manlius Torquatus	Roman consul 64 BC; With: Gaius Marcius Figulus	Succeeded by Cicero; G. Antonius Hybrida
