= Sextus Julius Caesar (consul 91 BC) =

Roman senator and general

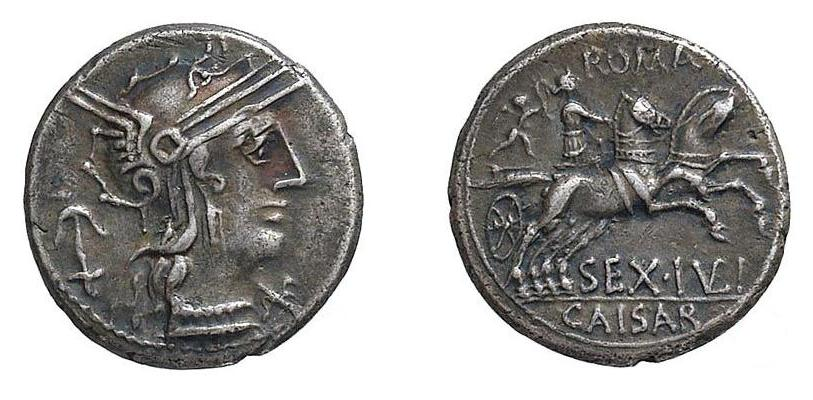

Sextus Julius Caesar (died 89 BC) was a Roman statesman, who held the consulship in 91 BC. He died during the Social War. He was the uncle of Gaius Julius Caesar, the dictator.

== Family ==
Sextus was the son of Gaius Julius Caesar and Marcia. Little is known of his father, except that he might have been the praetor Caesar who died suddenly at Rome. Wilhelm Drumann suspected that his grandfather was the senator Gaius Julius who wrote a history of Rome in Greek around 143 BC. Sextus had a brother, Gaius, who was praetor in an uncertain year (Broughton suggests 92 BC). Gaius was probably the elder brother, as he was named after his father. Following the cursus honorum, Sextus would have been at least forty years old when he obtained the consulship, placing his birth no later than 133 BC.

Sextus is known to have had an eponymous son, who was Flamen Quirinalis in 57 BC; the Sextus Julius Caesar who served in the Civil War, and was killed by his own soldiers during a revolt in Syria in 46 BC, was probably his grandson.

== Career ==
Under the cursus honorum, Sextus would have held the praetorship before standing for consul. His year of office is uncertain, but it could have been no later than 92 BC (Broughton suggests about 94). He was elected consul for 91, the year before the outbreak of the Social War. (Note: Care must be taken to distinguish Sextus from his cousin, Lucius Julius Caesar, who was consul in 90 BC, at the outbreak of the Social War.) As proconsul the following year, Sextus won an important military victory, probably over the Paeligni. He died of disease in 89, while laying siege to the city of Asculum.

== See also ==
- Julia gens

== Bibliography ==
- Titus Livius (Livy), Ab Urbe Condita (History of Rome).
- Gaius Plinius Secundus (Pliny the Elder), Naturalis Historia (Natural History).
- Appianus Alexandrinus (Appian), Bellum Civile (The Civil War), book i.
- Wilhelm Drumann, Geschichte Roms in seinem Übergang von der republikanischen zur monarchischen Verfassung, oder: Pompeius, Caesar, Cicero und ihre Zeitgenossen, Königsberg (1834–1844).
- Dictionary of Greek and Roman Biography and Mythology, William Smith, ed., Little, Brown and Company, Boston (1849).
- T. Robert S. Broughton, The Magistrates of the Roman Republic, American Philological Association (1952).

Political offices
Preceded by Gaius Claudius Pulcher; Marcus Perperna	Roman consul 91 BC; With: Lucius Marcius Philippus	Succeeded by Lucius Julius Caesar; Publius Rutilius Lupus
