= Julia Major (sister of Caesar) =

Elder sister of Caesar

Julia, also known as Julia Major and Julia the Elder, was the elder sister of Julius Caesar, the Roman dictator.

== Family ==
Julia was the first of three children born at Rome to Gaius Julius Caesar, a future proconsul, and his wife Aurelia. The exact year of Julia's birth is not known, but it must almost certainly have been before 103 BC as her youngest sibling Gaius was born at the earliest in 102 BC and there was a middle sister between them. Her name by the convention of the time matched her father's gens, the Julii; adjective Major distinguished from her sister Julia Minor, though not from other women of gens Julia.

Little is known of Julia's life. She may have married twice, once to a Pinarius, a member of a very ancient patrician family, and once to a Pedius, although the order of the marriages are not known. She was the grandmother of Lucius Pinarius (Note: It is not altogether certain whether Lucius Pinarius, Caesar's heir, who served in the army of the triumvirs, should be regarded as the same person as Lucius Pinarius Scarpus, who later served under Antonius, but went over to Octavian and received his pardon before the Battle of Actium.) and Quintus Pedius, who together with their cousin, Gaius Octavius, the grandson of Julia Minor, were named as Caesar's heirs in the dictator's will. Titus Pinarius, a friend of Cicero, was probably another grandson, and the brother of Lucius. At least some scholars have proposed that Lucius Pinarius and Quintus Pedius were Julia's sons, and not her grandsons.

Caesar's mother and one of his sisters gave testimony against Publius Clodius Pulcher when he was impeached for impiety, 61 BC, but it is uncertain whether the sister was Julia Major or Julia Minor. Caesar's wife, Pompeia, had volunteered to host the festival of the Bona Dea, which men were forbidden to attend. During the festival, Clodius entered Caesar's house disguised as a woman, supposedly to seduce Pompeia. Although Clodius was acquitted, the incident led Caesar, then the Pontifex Maximus, to divorce Pompeia, asserting that his wife should be above suspicion.

== See also ==
- Julia gens

== Bibliography ==
- Gaius Suetonius Tranquillus, The Twelve Caesars, "Caesar".
- Appianus Alexandrinus (Appian), Bellum Civile (The Civil War), book iii.
- Scholia Bobiensa, In Clodio, Johann Caspar von Orelli, ed.
- "Julia" (no. 3), in the Dictionary of Greek and Roman Biography and Mythology, William Smith, ed., Little, Brown and Company, Boston (1849).
- Friedrich Münzer, "Aus dem Verwandtenkreise Caesars und Octavians", in Hermes, vol. 71 (1936).
