= Sextus Julius Caesar (governor of Syria) =

Cousin of Julius Caesar

Sextus Julius Sex. f. Sex. n. Caesar was a cousin of the Roman general Gaius Julius Caesar, and served as one of his lieutenants during the Civil War. He was killed in a revolt of the soldiers while still a young man.

== Family ==
Sextus was the son of Sextus Julius Caesar, the Flamen Quirinalis, and grandson of Sextus Julius Caesar, who was consul in 91 BC. Although some scholars have supposed that he was identical with the flamen, Appian describes him as "very young" in 47 BC; the consul Sextus had died in 89, and the flamen held a very senior priesthood some ten years before the time that his son was so described by Appian. Sextus' grandfather, the consul, was an uncle of Gaius Julius Caesar, under whom the young Sextus would serve during the Civil War.

== Career ==
In 49 BC, early in the Civil War, Sextus was in Spain, serving in the army of his cousin, who dispatched him as an ambassador to Marcus Terentius Varro, one of Pompeius' commanders, whom Caesar later pardoned after the Battle of Pharsalus. At the end of the Alexandrine War in 47 BC, Caesar gave Sextus the command of Syria. It is unclear precisely what titles he held; Broughton suggests that he was one of Caesar's military tribunes in 49, then quaestor in 48; in Syria he may have been Caesar's legate, or perhaps proquaestor pro praetore; in either case he was governor of Syria.

At this time, Quintus Caecilius Bassus, one of Pompeius' lieutenants, who had fled to Tyre after the Battle of Pharsalus, endeavoured to gain the support of some of Sextus' soldiers. When the governor discovered his activity, Bassus gave the excuse that he was collecting troops to assist Mithridates of Pergamon. Bassus then spread the rumour that Caesar had been defeated and killed in Africa, and claimed that he had been appointed governor of Syria. He marched against Sextus, who defeated him; but then induced Sextus' own soldiers to revolt and slay their commander. Bassus claimed the title of praetor, and most of Sextus' troops, although a few remained loyal, and fled to Cilicia. Caesar then assigned Syria to Quintus Cornificius, then in Cilicia.

== See also ==
- Julia (gens)

== Bibliography ==
- Gaius Julius Caesar, Bellum Civile (The Civil War), book ii.
- Gaius Julius Caesar (attributed), De Bello Alexandrino (The Alexandrine War).
- Titus Flavius Josephus, Antiquities of the Jews, book xiv.
- Titus Flavius Josephus, The Jewish War, book i.
- Appianus Alexandrinus (Appian), Bellum Civile (The Civil War).
- Lucius Cassius Dio Cocceianus (Cassius Dio), Roman History, book lxvii.
- "Sex. Julius Caesar" (no. 24), in the Dictionary of Greek and Roman Biography and Mythology, William Smith, ed., Little, Brown and Company, Boston (1849).
- T. Robert S. Broughton, The Magistrates of the Roman Republic, American Philological Association (1952).
