= Julia (daughter of Caesar) =

Daughter of Julius Caesar and Cornelia

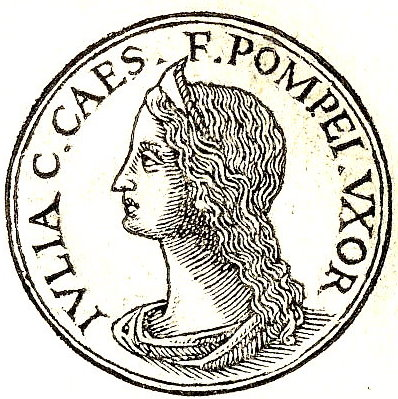
- Julia from Promptuarii Iconum Insigniorum. The inscription reads: "Julia; Gaius Caesar's daughter; Pompey's wife."
- Born: c. 76 BC; Rome
- Died: August 54 BC (aged c. 22); Rome
- Spouse: Pompey (m. 59 BC)
- Partner: Servilius Caepio
- Children: One (died at a few days old)
- Parents: Julius Caesar (father); Cornelia (mother)

Julia (c. 76 BC – August 54 BC) was the daughter of Julius Caesar and his first or second wife Cornelia, and his only child from his marriages. Julia became the fourth wife of Pompey the Great and was renowned for her beauty and virtue.

== Life ==
Julia may have been born around 76 BC. Her mother died in 69 BC after which she was raised by her paternal grandmother Aurelia Cotta. Her father engaged her to a Servilius Caepio. There has been a notion that it could have been Marcus Junius Brutus (Caesar's most famous assassin), who, after being adopted by his uncle, was known as Quintus Servilius Caepio Brutus for an unknown period; however, this is just conjecture. Caesar broke off this engagement and married her to Pompey in April 59 BC, with whom Caesar sought a strong political alliance in forming the First Triumvirate. This family-alliance of its two great chiefs was regarded as the firmest bond between Caesar and Pompey, and was accordingly viewed with much alarm by the optimates (the oligarchal party in Rome), especially by Marcus Tullius Cicero and Cato the Younger.

Pompey was supposedly infatuated with his bride. The personal charms of Julia were remarkable: she was a kind woman of beauty and virtue; and although policy prompted her union, and she was thirty years younger than her husband, she possessed in Pompey a devoted husband, to whom she was, in return, reportedly attached. A rumor suggested that the middle aged conqueror was losing interest in politics in favor of domestic life with his young wife. In fact, Pompey had been given the governorship of Hispania Ulterior, but had been permitted to remain in Rome to oversee the Roman grain supply as curator annonae, exercising his command through subordinates.

Plutarch reports that at the election of aediles in 55 BC, Pompey was surrounded by a tumultuous mob, and his robe was stained with the blood of some of the rioters. A slave carried the stained toga to his house and was seen by Julia. Imagining that her husband was slain, she fell into premature labor, miscarrying thereafter. As a result of the miscarriage, her health was irreparably damaged.

== Death ==
Julia died before a breach between her husband and father had become inevitable. In August of 54 BC, she died in childbirth, and her infant—a son, according to some writers, a daughter, according to others,—did not survive and died along with Julia.

Caesar was in Britain, according to Seneca, when he received the news of Julia's death.

Pompey wished her ashes to repose in his favourite Alban villa, but the Roman people, who loved Julia, determined they should rest in the Field of Mars (Campus Martius). For permission a special decree of the Senate was necessary, and Lucius Domitius Ahenobarbus, one of the consuls of 54 BC, impelled by his hatred for Pompey and Caesar, procured an interdict from the tribunes. But the popular will prevailed, and, after listening to a funeral oration in the forum, the people placed her urn in the field of Mars. Ten years later the official pyre for Caesar's cremation would be erected near the tomb of his daughter, but the people intervened after the funeral oration by Mark Antony and cremated Caesar's body in the Forum.

After Julia's death, Pompey and Caesar's alliance began to fade, which resulted in Caesar's civil war. It was allegedly remarked, as a singular omen, that on the day Augustus entered Rome as Caesar's adoptive son (in May 44 BC), the monument of Julia was struck by lightning. Caesar himself vowed a ceremony to her manes, which he exhibited in 46 BC as extensive funeral games including gladiatorial combats. The date of the ceremony was chosen to coincide, on September 26, with the ludi Veneris Genetricis, the festival in honor of Venus Genetrix, the divine ancestress of the Julians.

== Cultural depictions ==
In the Pharsalia by the Roman poet Lucan, the ghost of Julia appears to Pompey, blaming his remarriage to Cornelia Metella for the outbreak of civil war. The Italian Renaissance poet Carlo Marsuppini wrote a eulogy about Piccarda Bueri, in which he compared her to Julia. He names her as an example of great marital devotion.

In Dante Alighieri's epic poem the Divine Comedy (14th century), Julia was encountered by Dante in the first circle of Hell, the Limbo (where souls rest who are not in torture, pagans that lived righteous existences):

[...] The foremost circle that surrounds the abyss. [...]
[...] I knew, who in that Limbo were suspended. [...]
[...] Lucretia, Julia, Marcia, and Cornelia, [...]
