= Tiberius Gemellus =

Grandson of Tiberius, adopted son of Caligula

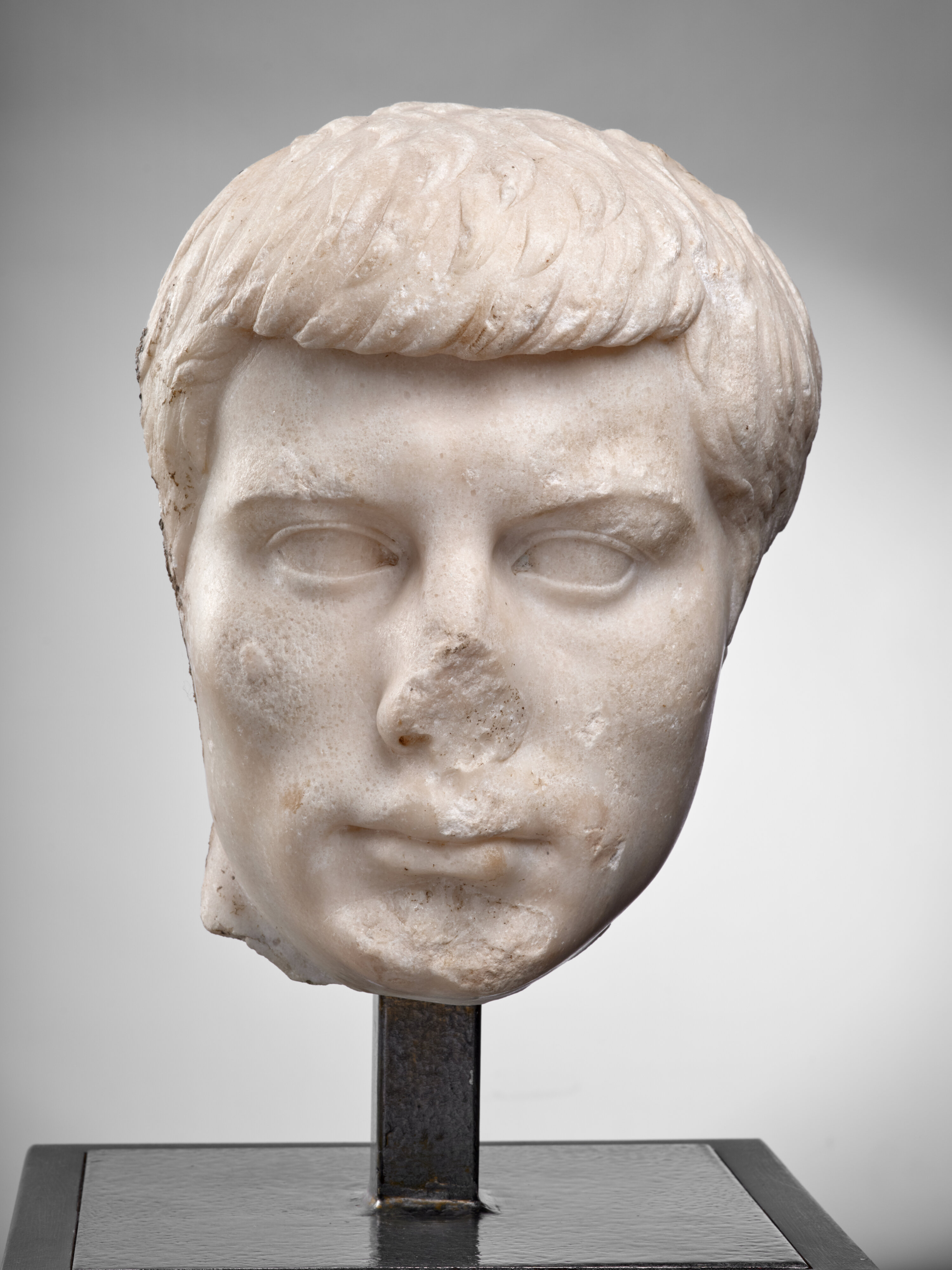
- Bust, Musée Saint-Raymond, Toulouse
- Born: 10 October AD 19
- Died: AD 37/38 (aged 17–18)
- Dynasty: Julio-Claudian
- Father: Drusus Julius Caesar; Caligula (adopted)
- Mother: Livilla

Tiberius Julius Caesar Nero, known as Tiberius Gemellus (10 October AD 19 – 37/38), was the son of Drusus and Livilla, the grandson of the Emperor Tiberius, and the cousin of the Emperor Caligula. Gemellus is a nickname meaning "the twin". His twin brother, Germanicus Gemellus, died as a young child in AD 23. His father and older cousins died, and are suspected by contemporary sources as having been systematically eliminated by the powerful praetorian prefect Sejanus. Their removal allowed Gemellus and Caligula to be named joint-heirs by Tiberius in 35, a decision that ultimately resulted in Caligula assuming power and having Gemellus killed (or forced to kill himself) in late 37 or early 38.

== Background ==
Gemellus was born the son of Drusus Julius Caesar and Livilla on 10 October AD 19, the same day his uncle Germanicus died in Syria. His paternal grandparents were emperor Tiberius and his wife, Vipsania Agrippina, with his maternal grandparents being general Nero Claudius Drusus and Antonia Minor. He was the twin brother of Germanicus Gemellus and the younger brother of Julia Livia. The birth of Gemellus and his twin were celebrated by Tiberius, who claimed that never before in the history of Rome had twins been born to a man as high in rank as Drusus, and the event was commemorated on the reverse of coins. His twin died while still a child in 23.

As a member of the Julio-Claudian dynasty, Gemellus was a close relative of all five Julio-Claudian emperors. On his father's side, he was the grandson of emperor Tiberius, and his adoptive great-grandfather was the founder of the Roman Empire, Augustus. On his mother's side, he was also Augustus' great-grandnephew, the nephew of Claudius, the cousin of Caligula, and the first cousin once removed of Nero.

== Life ==
=== Downfall of his relatives ===
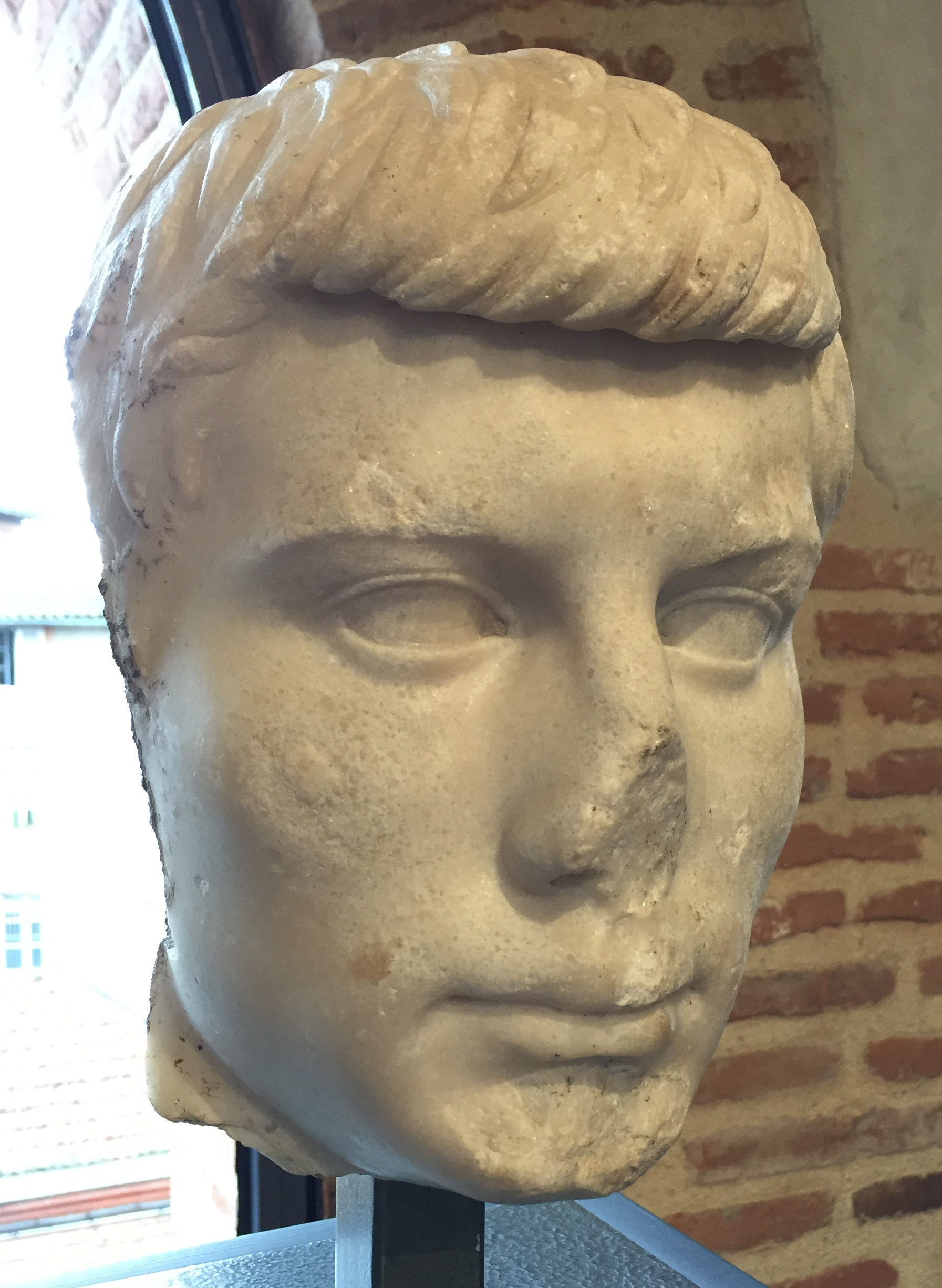
Bust of a Roman youth, probably Gemellus, from AD 30.

In the spring of 22, his father Drusus received tribunicia potestas (tribunician power) from the Senate, a clear sign that Drusus was Tiberius' heir. However, the following year marked a turning point for his father when his dispute with the powerful praetorian prefect Lucius Aelius Sejanus reached a critical point. In the account of Tacitus, Sejanus began plotting against Drusus to secure his position. On 14 September 23, his father died from what passed as natural causes. According to Cassius Dio and Tacitus, his father was poisoned by his wife Livilla at the behest of Sejanus. The exact cause of the feud is unknown.

His son's death not only devastated Tiberius but also challenged the future of the principate. Tiberius still trusted Sejanus and had no suspicion. Since Gemellus was too young, Tiberius adopted his great-nephews by Germanicus, Nero and Drusus, and recommended them to the Senate. Nero was given the office of quaestor five years in advance and was married to Gemellus' sister Livia to combine the families of both possible successors. However, neither would live to succeed Tiberius.

By 26, the emperor had withdrawn from politics altogether and moved to Capri, leaving the management of the empire to Sejanus who then began eliminating other members of the imperial family. In 28/29, Nero was charged by the Senate with homosexuality for which he was exiled to the island of Ponza. Germanicus' son Drusus was imprisoned within the dungeon under the Imperial palace on the Palatine Hill, where he starved to death not long after. Nero died in exile in 33. Suetonius says Tiberius promoted the rise of Sejanus to secure the succession of Gemellus, his natural grandson, at the expense of Germanicus' sons Nero and Drusus.

Sejanus remained powerful until his sudden downfall and summary execution in October 31, the exact reasons for which remain unclear. On 26 October 31, just eight days after his death, his wife Apicata committed suicide. According to Cassius Dio, she left a message for the emperor: his son had been murdered by his wife Livilla and her lover, Sejanus. The story should be read with caution. Barbara Levick says that Sejanus must have murdered Drusus in self-defense because only Tiberius stood between the Praetorian Prefect and the end of his career at the hands of Drusus. Furthermore, she says it is even less likely that Livilla would have been complicit in the destruction of her family, the key to her children's future. Levick dismisses the accusation of Apicata as the revenge of a woman whose husband left her for another.

=== Succession ===
The deaths of his cousins elevated Gemellus and his older cousin Gaius Caesar (Caligula). As there was no formal mechanism for succession of the imperial office, the only legal way in which Tiberius could promote an heir who was too young to assume the political powers of emperor was to bequeath to him his own estate upon which much of the Roman state had come to depend. According to Suetonius, Tiberius had suspicions of Gaius but he detested Gemellus as he believed him to be the result of an adulterous affair by his mother. Gemellus' young age was another factor in the advancement of Caligula, who was made quaestor in 33. The two were summoned to live with Tiberius on Capri, with Caligula joining him as early as 33. In 35 Tiberius named them as joint-heirs to his estates. Tacitus records that while they were in Capri, Tiberius looked at Caligula in tears, with Gemellus in his arms, and told him:

You will kill him, and another will kill you.

— Tacitus, Annals VI.46

Tiberius died on 16 March 37, and Caligula became Emperor. He accomplished this with the aid of Praetorian prefect Macro and the consuls of 37 who agreed to nullify Tiberius' will, thereby allowing him to inherit all of the estates which otherwise would have been divided with Gemellus. Gemellus was formally granted his toga virilis (toga of manhood), was adopted by Caligula, co-opted into the Arval Brethren, and given the title of princeps iuventutis (leader of the youth). His tirocinium, the public ceremony where young men donned the toga and became eligible for military service, was held in July 37, and a congiarium of 75 denarii was distributed to each citizen by Caligula. Comments by Tacitus and Suetonius that Gemellus was still a child this year, despite the fact that he was 18, may refer to his mental development. This would explain why he had not yet received the toga of manhood.

It is possible that his adoption meant an official recognition and acceptance as Caligula's heir. Philo saw this as a ploy to put Gemellus under Caligula's patria potestas (power of a father), and perhaps to convince the Senate to go along with nullifying Tiberius' will. Adopting Gemellus gave Caligula time to deal with the succession issue.

=== Death ===
Following an illness suffered by Caligula, Gemellus was put to death in late 37 or early 38. Cassius Dio places his death, and that of Caligula's father-in-law, Marcus Junius Silanus, in late 37. Their replacements in the Arval Brethren were not found until 24 May 38. He goes on to explain that Gemellus waited for a chance to benefit from Caligula's illness. According to Philo, Caligula's pretended reason was a conspiracy. Suetonius says that Gemellus took medicine for a chronic cough and that the smell was detected, leading to accusations of taking an antidote for poison. He was ordered by Caligula to commit suicide, for which soldiers gave him a sword and had to help him, because he is said not to have known how to kill himself with it.

Dio notes that Gemellus was charged with praying for and anticipating Caligula's death. The historian Anthony Barrett observes that Gemellus would have represented Caligula during his illness at nonpolitical events with his uncle Claudius representing the emperor at games. He suggests that Caligula viewed anything that Gemellus did in his name with paranoia although Gemellus's only named supporter (to the extent that he should co-rule with Caligula) was Aulus Avilius Flaccus, the prefect of Egypt.

No mention of his death was made by Caligula to the Senate, and Gemellus's tomb makes no mention of his adoptive relation to the emperor, simply reading:

Ti(berius) Caesar / Drusi Caesaris f(ilius) / hic situs est

— CIL VI, 00892
Translation:

"Here lies Tiberius Caesar, son of Drusus Caesar."

— Barrett 2002, p. 75

== In popular culture ==
Gemellus is played by Douglas Melbourne in the episode "Zeus, by Jove!" of the 1976 BBC TV series I, Claudius.

Gemellus is played by Bruno Brive in the 1979 film Caligula.

Gemellus is played by Leon Wadham in Season 3 of the Netflix TV series Roman Empire.

== Bibliography ==
=== Primary sources ===
- Cassius Dio, Roman History Books 58–59, English translation
- Philo, Against Flaccus, English translation
- Suetonius, Lives of the Twelve Caesars, Life of Caligula, Latin text with English translation
- Suetonius, Lives of the Twelve Caesars, Life of Tiberius, Latin text with English translation
- Tacitus, Annals, II–VI, English translation

=== Secondary sources ===
- Adams, Geoff W. (2007), The Roman Emperor Gaius "Caligula" and His Hellenistic Aspirations, BrownWalker Press, ISBN 9781599424231
- Barrett, Anthony A. (2002), Caligula: The Corruption of Power, Routledge, ISBN 9781134609888
- Bingham, Sandra J. (1999) [1997], The praetorian guard in the political and social life of Julio-Claudian Rome, Ottawa: National Library of Canada, ISBN 0612271064, archived from the original (PDF) on 2017-03-01
- Gianakos, Larry James (1981), Television drama series programming: a comprehensive chronicle, 1975-1980, Volume 3, Scarecrow Press
- Burns, Jasper (2007), Great Women of Imperial Rome: Mothers and Wives of the Caesars, Routledge, ISBN 978-0415408974
- Levick, Barbara (1966), Drusus Caesar and the Adoptions of A.D. 4, Latomus, Société d'Études Latines de Bruxelles, pp. 227–244
- Levick, Barbara (1999), Tiberius the Politician, Routledge, ISBN 0-415-21753-9
- Rowe, Greg (2002), Princes and Political Cultures: The New Tiberian Senatorial Decress, University of Michigan Press, ISBN 0472112309
- Scullard, H.H. (1982), From the Gracchi to Nero: A History of Rome 133 BC to AD 68 (fifth ed.), Routledge, ISBN 0-415-02527-3
- Shotter, David (2014), Rome and Her Empire, Routledge, ISBN 9781317881421
