= Wilhelm Drumann =

German classical historian (1786–1861)

Wilhelm Karl August Drumann (11 June 1786, in Danstedt – 29 July 1861, in Königsberg) was a German classical historian.

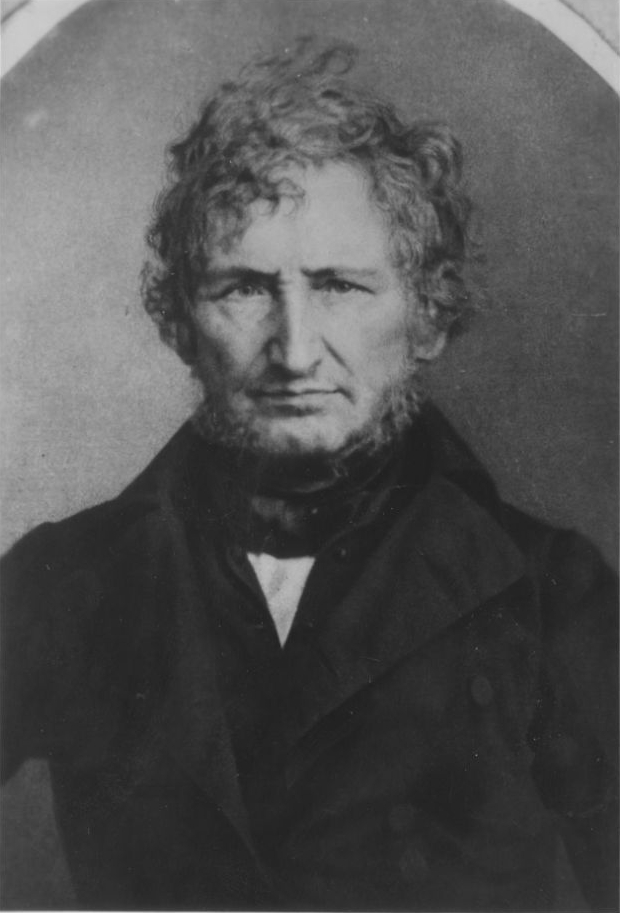
Wilhelm Drumann

From 1805, he studied theology and philosophy at the University of Halle, receiving his doctorate at Helmstedt in 1810. Following graduation, he worked as a teacher at the Pädagogium of the Francke Foundations in Halle. In 1812, he obtained his habilitation for ancient history, and five years later became an associate professor at the University of Königsberg. In 1820, he was named third librarian at the university library, and during the following year attained a full professorship.

== Published works ==
He is best remembered as author of an acclaimed history on Rome's transition from a Republic to an Empire, Geschichte Roms in seinem Uebergange von der republikanischen zur monarchischen Verfassung, oder: Pompeius, Caesar, Cicero und ihre Zeitgenossen; published in 1834–44 (6 volumes). His other noted works include:

- Ideen zur Geschichte des Verfalls der griechischen Staaten, 1815 – Ideas on the history of the decline of the Greek states.
- Versuch einer Geschichte des Verfalls der griechischen Staaten, 1820 – Essay on the history of the decline of the Greek states.
- Historisch-antiquarische Untersuchungen über Aegypten, 1823 – Historical-antiquarian investigations on Egypt.
- Grundriß der Culturgeschichte, 1847 – Outline of cultural history.
- Geschichte Bonifacius des Achten (2 volumes, 1852) – History of Boniface VIII.
- Die Arbeiter und Communisten in Griechenland und Rom, 1860 – Workers and communists in Greece and Rome.
