= Tyrrhenika =

Lost work by Roman emperor Claudius

Tyrrhenika (Ancient Greek: Τυρρηνικά, "About the Etruscans") is a 20-book lost work written in ancient Greek by the Roman emperor Claudius. It was a historical work on the Etruscans and their civilization.

== Background ==
The text and its division in books (the number twenty, two decades, was maybe a memory and a tribute to Titus Livius) are mentioned in a quotation in Suetonius. Claudius' work was not the first dedicated to the Etruscans in the classical world. The Aristotelian school had already produced the Tyrrhènon nomima, and Theophrastus a work entitled Peri Tyrrhènon. During the reign of Augustus then the Etruscans were back in fashion, as shown by the interest shown in them by Virgil, Maecenas, Verrius Flaccus and Dionysius of Halicarnassus. The emperor's interest in Etruscology was boosted by his marriage to Plautia Urgulanilla, whose grandmother Urgulania belonged to the originally Etruscan Urgulania gens. The Urgulanii were one of Tarquinii's most prominent and conservative families, and through this marriage they had practically adopted Augustus' young grandson. The marriage to Urgulanilla possibly gave him access to first-hand information about the Etruscans. In particular, he could have gained access to Elogia of the noble families of this Etruscan city, some fragments of which, bearing the name of the Urgulania gens, were found in the Tarquinian Acropolis and published in 1948. Moreover, it is likely that he knew the Etruscan language, and that he drew information both from earlier Latin authors and from original Etruscan works, which were still available in the first century AD.

The work was not the first compiled by Claudius: in fact, it was preceded by some writings written during his adolescence, which have also been lost. Claudius was proverbial for his pedantry and his sterile erudition, which led him to be only a compiler of already published sources, so one might have expected a work of little value, nothing more than a compilation of the available works on the subject in Latin and Greek. In this case, however, his marriage to the scion of an important Tuscan family, which gave him first-hand knowledge of the Etruscan environment, leads one to suspect a work of quality. The emperor was so proud of Tyrrhenika that he had it publicly read in the Library of Alexandria on alternate days with another of his works, Carchedonica, also in Greek and lost, on the Carthaginians.

== Content ==
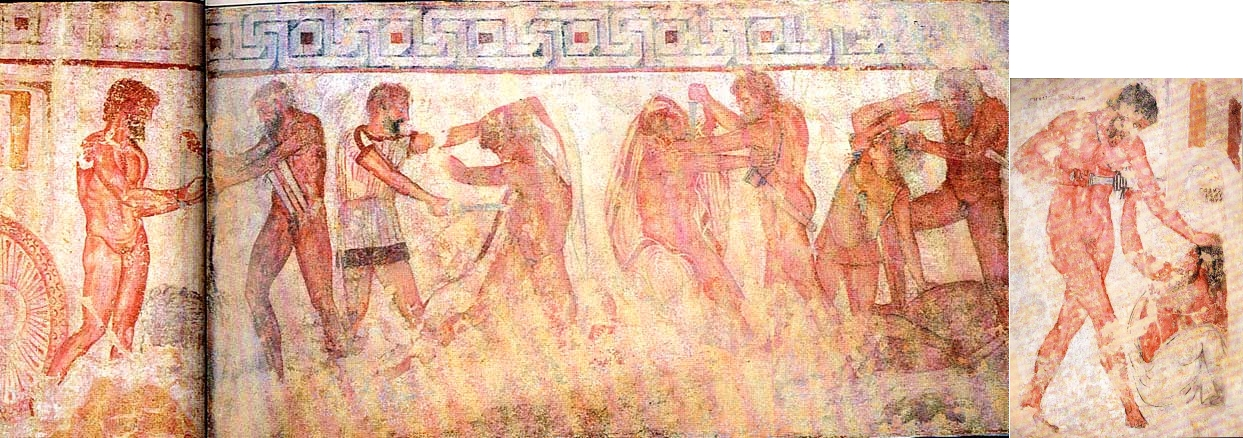
Fresco in the François Tomb in Vulci with the liberation of Caelius Vibenna by Mastarna and Aulus Vibenna

Tyrrhenika was a history of the Etruscan people. From the Tabula Claudiana, which records an address by Claudius to the Roman Senate, we know that within it was a chapter concerning the sixth king of Rome, Servius Tullius. In the speech the emperor cites the exploits of the brothers Caelius and Aulus Vibenna, along with Servius (of which he gives the name in Etruscan, Mastarna), affirming that he reports what Etruscan authors (auctores Tusci) wrote. From the same address we know that in his work Claudius mentions several Etruscan figures who obtained Roman citizenship. It has been also suggested that this work by Claudius could have been used as a source about the Etruscans by Roman historians such as Tacitus and the minor historian Festus. Moreover, it has been also speculated that the Tyrrhenika contained pro-Etruscan statements, and that this is one of the reasons why it has since been lost. It is possible that all the copies of the work were destroyed during the early reign of Nero.

The loss of this work limits our knowledge of the Etruscans. The discovery of a copy or even fragments of Tyrrhenika could be decisive in shedding light on the many mysteries related to the Etruscans and their civilization.

== Sources ==
- Briquel, Dominique (1988). "Claude, érudit et empereur". Comptes rendus des séances de l'Académie des Inscriptions et Belles-Lettres (in French). 132–1: 217-232.
- Malitz, Jürgen (1994). V.M. Strocka (ed.). Claudius, der Prinzeps als Gelehrter (PDF). Die Regierungszeit des Kaisers Claudius (41-54 n.Chr.). Umbruch oder Episode? Internationales interdisziplinäres Symposion aus Anlaß des hundertjährigen Jubiläums des Archäologischen Instituts der Universität, Freiburg i.Br, 16.-18. Februar 1991 (in German). Mainz. p. 133-141.
