= Marcus Plautius Silvanus (consul 2 BC) =

Roman senator and general

Marcus Plautius Silvanus was a Roman politician and general active during the Principate. He was consul in 2 BC as the colleague of the emperor Augustus.

== Biography ==
Marcus Plautius Silvanus the son of another Marcus Plautius Silvanus and Urgulania, a close friend of the empress Livia who was of Etruscan descent. It is suggested by Ronald Syme, extrapolating from Tacitus, that it was Urgulania's influence over Livia that allowed Silvanus to climb the cursus honorum, enabling him to reach the consulate in 2 BC alongside Augustus. Silvanus was then made proconsul of Asia in 4-5 AD, followed by appointment as legatus pro praetore of the imperial province of Galatia in 6 AD, where he was involved in suppressing the Isaurians as mentioned in Cassius Dio. He was also a septemvir of the Epulones.

Although Silvanus served under Tiberius for the duration of the Great Illyrian Revolt or Bellum Batonianum, Syme suggests that the future emperor had doubts about him, due to his close connection, via his mother, with Livia. Certainly Silvanus does not appear in the histories after the events in Illyricum during AD 6–9.

== Suppression of the Isaurians ==
In the year AD 6, Silvanus was assigned as Proconsul to the province of Galatia, which by that date included the coastal region of Pamphylia. Cassius Dio writes that the Isaurians began a series of 'marauding expeditions', and did not desist until they were faced with 'grim war.' The modern historian, Noel Lenski, following Syme and Mitchell, writes that the client king, Archelaus I, was unable to handle the uprising himself, 'and thereby forced the Romans to commit at least two legions under Marcus Plautius Silvanus to regain control.' Mitchell also suggests that one of these legions was Legio VII Macedonica which was stationed at Antioch during the period.

== Participation in the Great Illyrian Revolt, or Bellum Batonianum ==
Late in AD 6, the Great Illyrian Revolt or Bellum Batonianum began in Illyricum. In AD 7, probably late in autumn of early in winter, Silvanus was summoned by Tiberius, who had been assigned to the command of the military situation in Illyricum, to bring more forces to help suppress the revolt. The ancient writers do not state where these legions came from; however modern historians have deduced that he brought two (or possibly three) legions, possibly Legio IV Scythica and Legio V Macedonica, perhaps drawn from Syria.

Regarding the year in which Silvanus arrived in Illyricum, the ancient writers all give the year AD 7, which was followed by the twentieth century historian Syme who stated the 7 AD date was 'indisputable.' However, some modern historians have suggested a contradictory, and probably erroneous, 'amphibious landing' during AD 6. Nevertheless, there may have been an amphibious landing. For Paterculus clearly states “ (4) But the division of their forces which had swarmed out to meet the army which the consulars Aulus Caecina and Silvanus Plautius were bringing up from the provinces across the sea, surrounded five of our legions, together with the troops of our allies and the cavalry of the king (for Rhoemetalces, king of Thrace, in conjunction with the aforesaid generals was bringing with him a large body of Thracians as reinforcements for the war), and inflicted a disaster that came near being fatal to all. ”

Velleius Paterculus seems to suggest that Silvanus joined Caecina Severus, the imperial legate of Moesia, in his province before they marched together towards Illyricum. During the march, they were joined by a cavalry force of Thracians, led by King Rhoemetalces. This force was unexpectedly attacked en route by the enemy near the Volcaean marshes, in northern Pannonia near Siscia (modern Sisak), but successfully defeated them. Dio, however, does not mention Silvanus' involvement in this incident, while modern historians explicitly state that this event only involved Caecina and his Moesian forces.

Once the two generals, Silvanus and Caecina Severus, and their legions had joined forces and successfully reached Illyricum, they fought a major battle against the rebels near Sirmium. The Roman forces were victorious, but suffered heavy losses. Velleius Paterculus mentions the deaths of military tribunes, a number of prefects, a camp prefect and some centurions, including some of the front rank. No number is given of total deaths. Paterculus called this battle 'an almost deadly defeat' and states that the victory 'won more glory [for the soldiers] than was left over for their officers,' due to their failure to follow Tiberius' example and send out scouts to ascertain the location of the enemy.

Following this unpromising beginning, Silvanus with his two 'eastern legions', accompanied by Caecina's legion, marched to Siscia (modern Sisak) to join Tiberius and the two legions already assembled there. Once the men had had time to recover, Tiberius immediately split the forces into four, sending Caecina back to Moesia, and marching with Silvanus and the 'eastern legions' back to Sirmium where they wintered, and where Silvanus continued to operate from for the remainder of the conflict. Paterculus states that Tiberius took them on a 'long and extremely arduous march, the difficulties of which are hardly describable,' though he does not mention Silvanus' role specifically.

During AD 8, Dio relates that Silvanus personally led a successful campaign to defeat the Breucians, and won the allegiance of some other Illyrian tribes without a fight.

In the final year of the revolt, AD 9, Silvanus remained in Illyricum, acting out of Sirmium. Dio states that his forces were ravaging Pannonia, which caused the remaining tribes to make terms. For his actions, he was granted triumphal honours along with the other commanders, attested by the inscription which appears on Silvanus' tomb in Tivoli, Italy.

== Family ==
Marcus Plautius Silvanus was the son of another Marcus Plautius Silvanus (unattested) and Urgulania, a close friend of Livia. It is possible that the family is descended from Marcus Plautius Hypsaeus, consul in 125 BC, however this is doubted by Syme.

Silvanus married Lartia. Their known children include:

- Marcus Plautius Silvanus. First married Fabia Numantina, but their marriage was over prior to AD 24, as by then he was married to Apronia, daughter of Lucius Apronius. He was accused of murdering Apronia by throwing her out of a window. The murder was investigated by emperor Tiberius himself. Urgulania then sent her grandson a dagger, encouraging him to commit suicide, which he duly did. Shortly after the murder of Apronia, Fabia Numantina was "charged with having caused her husband's insanity by magical incantations and potions", but was acquitted.
- Aulus Plautius Urgulanius. Died at the age of nine.
- Publius Plautius Pulcher. Friend and companion of his nephew Claudius Drusus. Quaestor to Tiberius, and augur; governor of Sicilia.
- Plautia Urgulanilla, first wife of the emperor Claudius.

He is also the first cousin of Aulus Plautius, who was the father of Aulus Plautius, leader of the Invasion of Britannia in 43 AD.

== Mausoleum of the Plautii ==
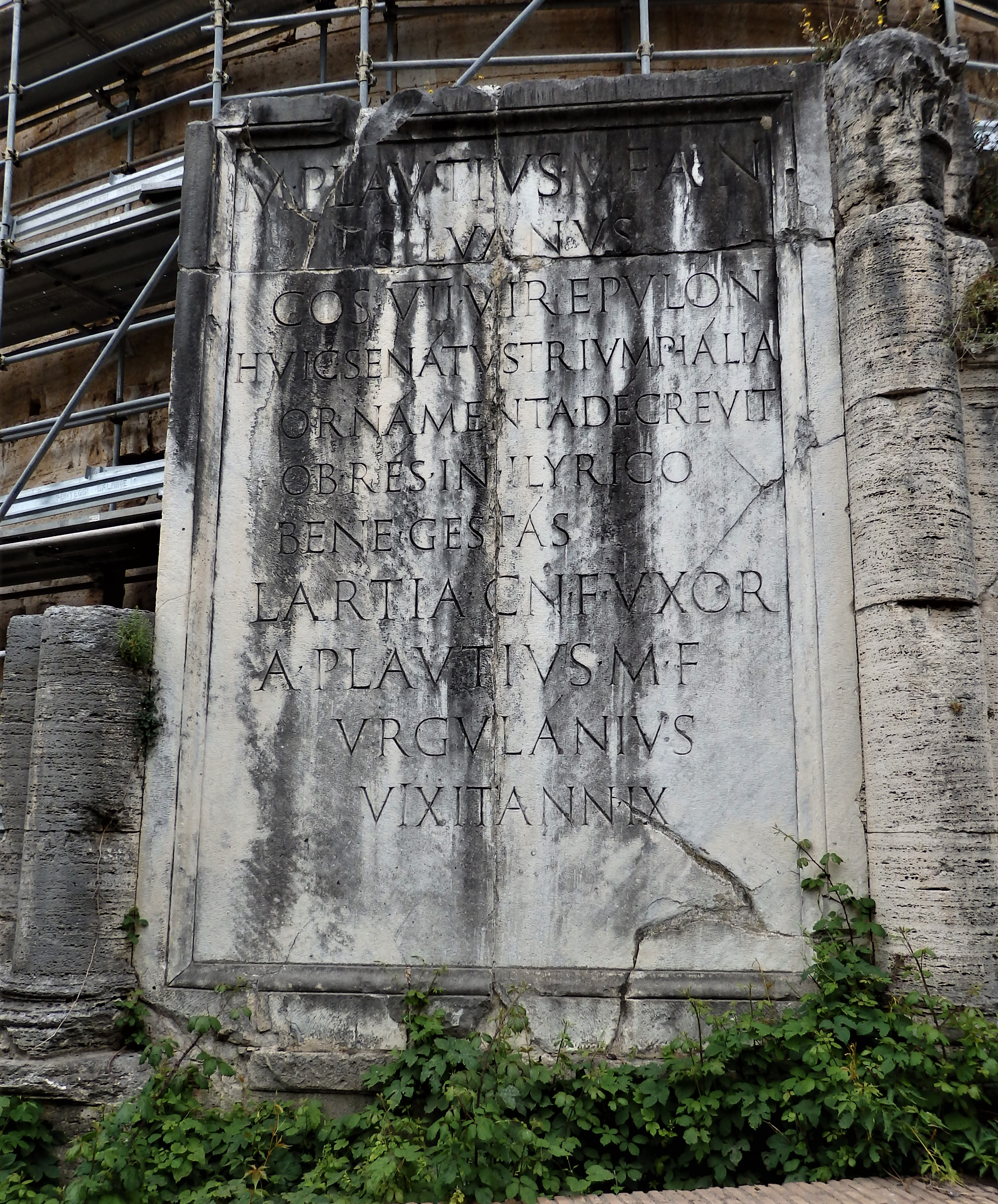

The mausoleum in which Marcus Plautius Silvanus was interred still stands in modern Tivoli, Italy. A large inscription outlining Silvanus' achievements is still in place, and includes his wife, Lartia and one of his sons, Aulus Plautius Urgulanius, alongside the separate, very detailed stone of his adopted grandson Tiberius Plautius Silvanus Aelianus.

The Latin inscription reads: "M Plautius M F A N/ Silvanus/ Cos VIIvir Epulon/ huic senatus triumphalia/ ornamenta decrevit/ ob res in Ilyrico/ bene gestas/ Lartia CN F Uxor/ A Plautius M F/ Urgulanius/ vixit ann IX."

The mausoleum was famously painted as 'The Lucano Bridge and Mausoleum Plauti', and engraved from two different places by Giovanni Battista Piranesi, and amongst others, by Franz Knebel and Onorato Carlandi. It also featured on Spode ceramics, the design called 'Bridge of Lucano' during the early 19th century.

== See also ==
- Tiberius Plautius Silvanus Aelianus
- Urgulania
- Bellum Batonianum or Great Illyrian Revolt
- Plautia gens

== Sources ==
- Cassius Dio, (2007) Roman History.
- Velleius Paterculus, (2011) Roman History.
- Publius Cornelius Tacitus, Annales.
- Inscription of the Tomb of the Plautii, CIL XIV, 3606
- Abdale, J.R, (2019) The Great Illyrian Revolt: Rome's Forgotten War in the Balkans, AD6-9. Pen and Sword.
- Dzino, D. (2010) The Failure of Greater Illyricum., published online Cambridge.org.
- Lenski, N. (1999) "From Assimilation and Revolt in the Territory of Isauria, from the Sixth Century BC to the Sixth Century AD," Journal of Economics and Social History of the Orient, Vol 42, no. 4, pp. 413-465. (Jstor)
- Mitchell, S, (1976) "Legio VII and the Garrison of Augustan Galatia", Classical Quarterly no. 26, pp. 298-308.
- Syme, Ronald, (1933) "Some Notes on the Legions under Augustus," Journal of Roman Studies, Vol 23, pp. 14-33. (Jstor)
- Syme, Ronald, (1934) Galatia and Pamphylia under Augustus: The Governorship of Piso, Quirinus and Silvanus. Klio no. 27, p122-148.
- Syme, Ronald, (1939) The Roman Revolution., Clarendon Press, Oxford.
- Syme, Ronald, (1986) The Augustan Aristocracy., Clarendon Press, Oxford.
- Lily Ross Taylor, (1956) "Trebula Suffenas and the Plautii Silvani", in Memoirs of the American Academy in Rome, vol. 24.(Jstor)
- Wilkes, J.J, (1969) Dalmatia., Routledge, 1969.

Political offices
Preceded by Lucius Cornelius Lentulus; Marcus Valerius Messalla Messallinus as ordinary consul	Roman consul 2 BC with Augustus XIII	Succeeded by Lucius Caninius Gallus as suffect consul
