= Urgulania gens =

Ancient Roman family

The gens Urgulania was an obscure plebeian family at ancient Rome. Few members of this gens are mentioned in history, of whom the most prominent was Urgulania, a friend of the empress Livia, and grandmother of Plautia Urgulanilla, the first wife of the emperor Claudius.

== Origin ==
The nomen Urgulanius is thought to be of Etruscan origin. A family of this name settled at Salona in Dalmatia.

== Praenomina ==
Most of the Urgulanii known from history and inscriptions bore the praenomen Publius. A few other names are found, but only Sextus appears to be a regular name of this gens.

== Members ==
- Urgulania, a friend of Livia, and the grandmother of Plautia Urgulanilla, the first wife of Claudius. She was the wife of Marcus Plautius Silvanus, and their son Marcus was consul with Augustus in AD 2.
- Urgulania Psephis, a young woman buried at Rome, aged twenty-two, in a tomb dating from the late first century BC, or early first century AD.
- Aulus Avidius Urgulanius, present with Augustus on his diplomatic mission to Alexandria in AD 12.
- Marcus Avidius Urgulanius, perhaps a relative of Urgulania.
- Sextus Urgulanius, the father of Lucius Magius Urgulanianus.
- Sextus Urgulanius Sex. f., the brother of Lucius Magius Urgulanianus.
- Lucius Magius Sex. f. Urgulanianus, the son of Sextus Urgulanius, was adopted into the Magia gens. He was a distinguished soldier, and served as tribune of one of the urban cohorts. He was buried at Suessa Aurunca in Campania, in a tomb dating to the first half of the first century.
- Publius Urgulanius Pistus, named in a sepulchral inscription from Rome, dating to the first half of the first century.
- Publius Urgulanius Rufus, the former master of Publius Urgulanius, a freedman named in a sepulchral inscription from Rome, dating from the first half of the first century.
- Publius Urgulanius, a freedman of Publius Urgulanius Rufus, named in a sepulchral inscription from Rome, dating from the first half of the first century.
- Urgulania Chrysis, named in a first-century inscription from Rome.
- Publius Urgulanius Sabinus, buried in a first-century tomb at Cemenelum in Alpes Maritimae, along with his wife, Julia Tertia.
- Publius Urgulanius Damocrates, named in a second-century sepulchral inscription from Rome.
- Publius Urgulanius Hymetus, buried at Rome in a second-century tomb dedicated by his daughter, Plautia Prima.
- Publius Urgulanius Theophilus, the husband of Sempronia Quarta and father of Publius Urgulanius Ursus, was buried at Salona in Dalmatia, in a tomb dedicated by his wife, dating to the second half of the second century.
- Urgulanius Secundus, one of the municipal duumvirs at Verulae in Latium in AD 197. His colleague was Lucius Alfius Valentinus.
- Publius Urgulanius, named in a second- or third-century inscription from Fulginiae
- Publius Urgulanius Euvodius, a young man buried at Salona, aged twenty-two, with a monument from his sister, Urgulania Nice, dating between the middle of the second century and the end of the third.
- Urgulania Nice, dedicated a second- or third-century monument at Salona to her brother, Publius Urgulanius Euvodius.
- Publius Urgulanius Primitivus, built a second- or third-century tomb at Salona for his mother, Urgulania Valentina.
- Urgulania Valentina, buried at Salona in a tomb built by her son, Publius Urgulanius Primitivus, dating between the middle of the second century, and the end of the third.
- Publius Urgulanius P. f. Ursus, the son of Publius Urgulanius Theophilus and Sempronia Quarta, built a tomb at Salona for his mother, dating between the late second century and the end of the third.

=== Undated Urgulanii ===
- Urgulania, buried at Rome in a tomb built by her husband, Publius Urgulanius Helico.
- Publius Urgulanius Ɔ. f. Helico, a freedman, built a tomb at Rome for his wife, Urgulania.
- Publius Urgulanius Hyacinthus, named in a sepulchral inscription from Rome, alongside Publius Urgulanius Tanais.
- Urgulanius Rufus, the former master of the freedwoman Urgulania Tertia.
- Publius Urgulanius Tanais, named in a sepulchral inscription from Rome, alongside Publius Urgulanius Hyacinthus.
- Urgulania Tertia, the freedwoman of an Urgulanius Rufus, named in an inscription from Tibur in Latium.
- Urgulania Tyche, an infant buried at Rome, aged one year, nine months.
- Urgulania Venustina, buried at Ostia in Latium.

== See also ==
- List of Roman gentes

== Bibliography ==
- Theodor Mommsen et alii, Corpus Inscriptionum Latinarum (The Body of Latin Inscriptions, abbreviated CIL), Berlin-Brandenburgische Akademie der Wissenschaften (1853–present).
- René Cagnat et alii, L'Année épigraphique (The Year in Epigraphy, abbreviated AE), Presses Universitaires de France (1888–present).
- Bernard Pyne Grenfell and Arthur Surridge Hunt (eds.), The Oxyrhynchus Papyri (Greco-Roman Memoirs), Egypt Exploration Fund, London (1898–present).
- Inscriptiones Italiae (Inscriptions from Italy), Rome (1931-present).
- Il Lapidario Zeri di Mentana (1982).
- Olli Salomies, Adoptive and Polyonymous Nomenclature in the Roman Empire, Societas Scientiarum Fennica, Helsinki (1992).
- Andrew Lintott, The Romans in the Age of Augustus, John Wiley & Sons (2009).
