= Urgulania =

Ancient Roman noblewoman

- Known for: friend of empress Livia
- Family: Urgulania gens

Urgulania (fl. 24 AD), was a prominent noblewoman during the reigns of Augustus and Tiberius, due to her friendship with the empress Livia. She was the mother of the Roman general Marcus Plautius Silvanus (consul in 2 BC), who had distinguished himself when fighting with the future Emperor Tiberius during the Great Illyrian Revolt in the Balkans. She was the grandmother to Plautia Urgulanilla, the first wife of the future emperor Claudius, and another Marcus Plautius Silvanus, the suspect in a notorious murder case.

== Life ==
Little is known of Urgulania's life prior to her son's consulship. Her husband, Marcus Plautius Silvanus, is only a name. Lily Ross Taylor notes that "Urgulania" was a very rare name, finding only 17 examples of it in the volumes of the Corpus Inscriptionum Latinarum, most of which appear in the volume dedicated to inscriptions found in the city of Rome. Taylor is doubtful that Urgulania became friends with Livia prior to her son's marriage to Lartia, but concurs with Ronald Syme that her influence led to his consulship.

Due to her closeness with Livia, Tacitus asserts that she held herself above the law. He relates how in AD 16 Lucius Calpurnius Piso the Augur, disgusted with "the corruption of the courts, the bribery of the judges, the cruel threats of accusations from hired orators" sued Urgulania. She refused his summons, and instead travelled to the imperial palace where Livia agreed to issue a statement against Piso's actions. Livia called Tiberius who had guards come and protect them, which forced Piso to go to them instead of the court. Livia paid a settlement and the matter was closed. Tacitus recounts a second trial where Urgulania was called as a witness; she demanded that the praetor take her deposition in her own home, rather than have her attend the court. Even the vestal virgins did not have this privilege.

Taylor offers an incident illustrating how warmly Urgulania felt towards the empress. The fasti of Trebula Suffenas, where the Plautii Silvani had their ancestral home, tells of Urgulania celebrating Livia's birthday in AD 24 by sponsoring a banquet for the decuriones and Augustales and a gladiator show for the common people. Taylor notes, "This is the only known municipal record of a celebration of Livia's birthday." However, it is worth drawing attention to the fact that in AD 24, Urgulania's grandson (Marcus Plautius Silvanus) had murdered his (probably third) wife, Apronia, by throwing her from a window and a little later, the future Emperor Claudius divorced her granddaughter, Plautia Urgulanilla, for adultery and implication in the murder. The celebration was therefore most likely an attempt to save the family name, rather than an expression of affection.

When Apronia was found dead in their home, apparently pushed from a great height, Tiberius himself came to investigate the crime scene, and found the bedroom showed signs of struggle. Silvanus was therefore implicated, though he tried to claim that he had been asleep when the death occurred, and that she had committed suicide. Before the trial could begin, Urgulania (perhaps at Livia's behest) sent her grandson a dagger. He used it on himself, saving himself (and her) the disgrace of being convicted of murder. It was after his death that his ex-wife Fabia Numantina was accused of cursing him, but this accusation was dismissed. The murder had a roll-on effect when Claudius divorced Urgulania's grand-daughter Urgulanilla due to a possible role in the murder of Apronia, though she was also accused of adultery with a freedman. Five months after the divorce, she gave birth to a daughter, Claudia, whom Claudius refused to acknowledge.

== See also ==
- List of Roman women
- Women in ancient Rome
