= De arte aleae =

Lost Roman book about dice

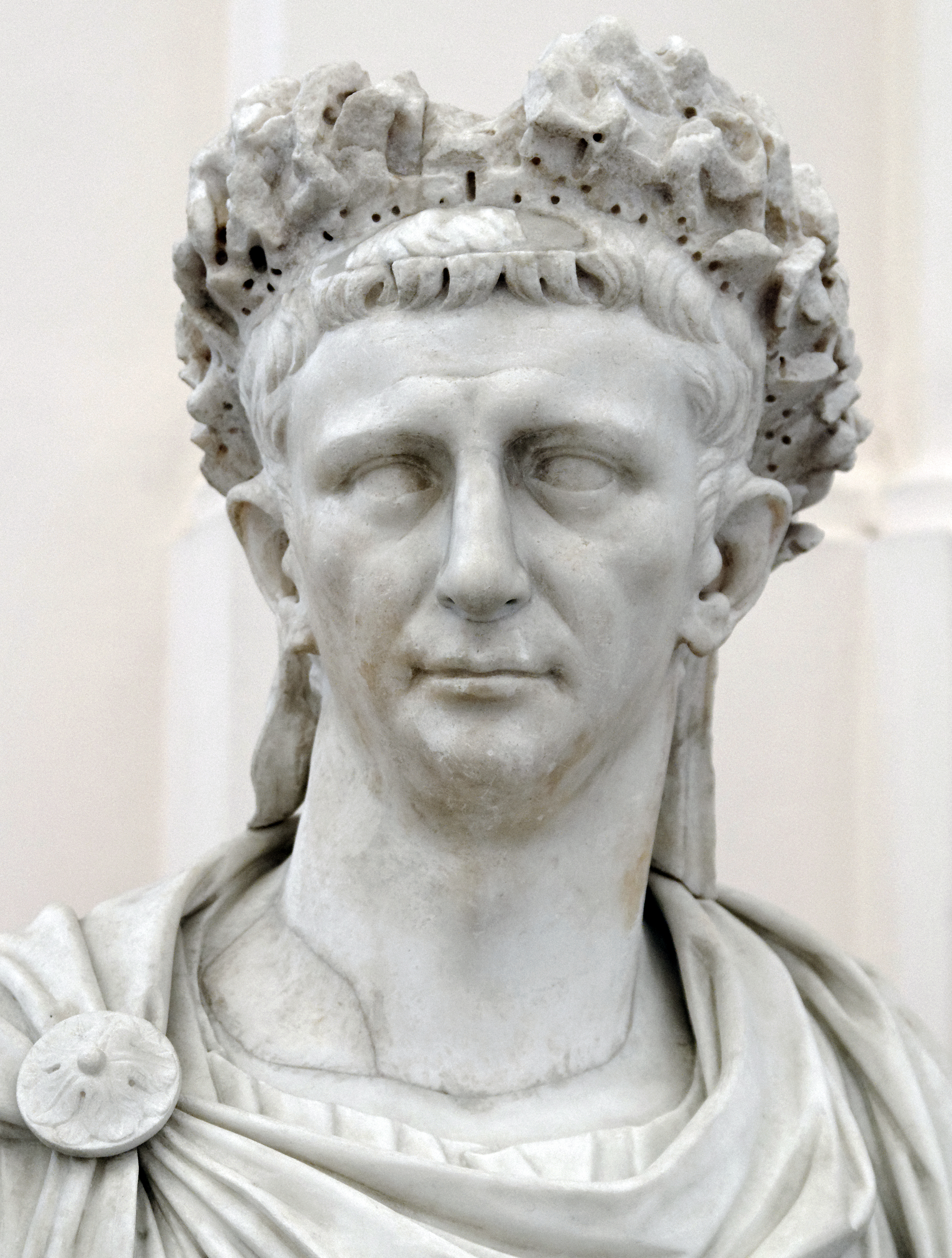
De arte aleae was written by Roman emperor Claudius about dice.

De arte aleae (Latin: [deː ˈartɛ ˈaːlɛ.ae̯]; On the Art of Dice) is the name of a now-lost book written by the fourth Roman emperor Claudius. As the name suggests, it detailed how to play the game of dice.

== History ==
In book five, chapter 33 of the work De vita Caesarum by Roman historian Suetonius (c. AD 69–122), the author discusses many of Roman Emperor Claudius's vices. The final one considered was the leader's love of dice. Suetonius notes, "[Claudius] played dice most avidly, on the art of which he also wrote a book" (Aleam studiosissime lusit, de cuius arte librum quoque emisit).

Mention of this work is only to be found in Suetonius's work. The title De arte aleae seems to be mostly speculative, and based merely on the assertion by Suetonius that the book was "on the art of [dice]". As a result, in textual history, the book became simply known as De arte aleae; for instance, in 1761, the librarian Heinrich Jonathan Clodius, in his reference work Primae Lineae Bibliothecae Lusoriae (Bibliographic Outline of Recreation) calls it "the Book on the Art of Dice" (Lib[er] de Arte Aleae) and directly references Suetonius in naming it as such.

While it seems reasonable to conclude that the book concerned dice, exactly what was included in the book is a mystery, as the work has been lost. Austin notes that it is very possible that the work may have dealt with a newer form of the game.

== Bibliography ==
- Austin, R. G. (1935). "Roman Board Games. II". Greece & Rome. 4 (11): 76–82. doi:10.1017/S0017383500003119. ISSN 0017-3835. JSTOR 640979. S2CID 248520932.
- Clodius, Heinrich Jonathan (1761). Primae Lineae Bibliothecae Lusoriae. Leipzig. p. 55 – via Bavarian State Library.
- Voogt, Alexander J. de (1995). New Approaches to Board Games Research: Asian Origins and Future Perspectives (in Latin). Leiden, Netherlands: IIAS – via University of Michigan.
