= Plautia Urgulanilla =

First wife of Claudius (married c. 9-24 AD)

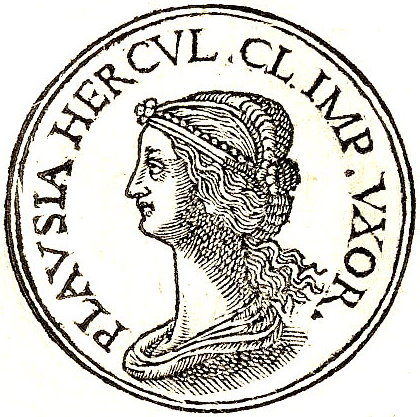
Plautia Urgulanilla from Guillaume Rouillé's Promptuarii Iconum Insigniorum, 1553.

Plautia Urgulanilla was the first wife of the future Roman Emperor Claudius. They were married circa 9 AD, when he was 18 years old. Suetonius writes that they were divorced in 24 AD on the grounds of her scandalous love affairs and the suspicion of murder.

== Family ==
Urgulanilla was a member of the Plautia gens. She was of Etruscan descent.

Her father was Marcus Plautius Silvanus, the consul for the year 2 BC, and a decorated general, honoured with triumphal ornaments for his successes in the Bellum Batonianum or Great Illyrian Revolt in 12 AD. He had served beside Tiberius. Her paternal grandmother was Urgulania, after whom Urgulanilla was named; her maternal grandmother was also a close friend of the Empress Livia Drusilla.

Her mother was named Lartia and was the daughter of Gnaeus Lartius.

Urgulanilla had three attested siblings:

- Marcus Plautius Silvanus, mentioned above. It is probable that he adopted Tiberius Plautius Silvanus Aelianus, who was consul in 45 AD and in 74 AD.
- Aulus Plautius Urgulanius, who died at the age of nine.
- Publius Plautius Pulcher, friend and companion of his nephew Claudius Drusus. Quaestor to Tiberius, and augur; governor of Sicilia. He was made a patrician by Claudius.

Through her family Urgulanilla was well-connected, but her marriage to Claudius was not a splendid match for a member of the imperial family; rather, it came about as consequence of the unfortunate fates of the other candidates. Claudius broke off his first engagement after Julia the Younger, the mother of his fiancée Aemilia Lepida, fell into disgrace, and his second fiancée Livia Medullina died on their wedding day.

Claudius and Urgulanilla were married circa 9 AD.

Urgulanilla had two attested children:

- A son with Claudius, named Claudius Drusus, whose betrothal to a daughter of Sejanus instilled great expectations in the prefect, left unfulfilled when Drusus died without reaching manhood.
- A daughter, Claudia, who was born five months after her divorce from Claudius. Claudius claimed that she had been fathered by his freedman Boter and thus repudiated the child and he had her laid at Urgulanilla's doorstep. She is sometimes confused with her younger half-sister Claudia Antonia

== Murder of Apronia ==
The murder in which Urgulanilla is supposed to have participated was that of her sister-in-law, Apronia, who was the second wife of Urgulanilla's brother, Marcus Plautius Silvanus. However, none of the existing ancient writings makes clear how she was involved, and the details provided by Tacitus seem to imply she could not have been personally involved at all. Plautius Silvanus was first married to Fabia Numantina; however, at some time before 24 AD, they had divorced, and he had married Apronia, a daughter of Lucius Apronius. In 24 AD, Plautius Silvanus was accused of murdering Apronia "for reasons not ascertained" by throwing her out of a window in that year. Silvanus responded by claiming that he was asleep when the event had occurred, and was totally unaware of the circumstances leading to her death, saying that she had perhaps committed suicide. The murder was investigated by the Emperor Tiberius who, having investigated the couple's bedroom, discovered proof of a scuffle, and therefore referred the case to the Senate for trial, thus implying that he believed Silvanus to be guilty. However, Silvanus' grandmother, Urgulania, sent him a dagger, encouraging him to commit suicide, which he duly did. Shortly after the murder of Apronia, Fabia Numantina was "charged with having caused her husband's insanity by magical incantations and potions" but was acquitted.

== In fiction ==
Urgulanilla appears as a significant character in I, Claudius by Robert Graves. She was played by Jennifer Croxton in the BBC TV adaptation.
