= Marcus Plautius Silvanus (praetor 24) =

1st century AD Roman senator

Marcus Plautius Silvanus was a Roman senator, and was praetor elect in 24 AD. He held the duumvirate of Trebula Suffenas in 23 AD.

He was a member of the gens Plautia, the son of Marcus Plautius Silvanus, consul in 2 BC, and Lartia, and was therefore related to the Aulus Plautius who invaded Britannia in 43 AD.

He first married Fabia Numantina, but their marriage was over by 24 AD, as by then he was married to Apronia, daughter of Lucius Apronius. He was accused of murdering Apronia "for reasons not ascertained," by throwing her out of a window in that year. Silvanus' response was to say that he had been asleep and was unaware of the circumstances leading to her death, saying that she had perhaps committed suicide. The murder was investigated by the Emperor Tiberius who, having inspected the couple's bedroom, discovered proof of a scuffle, and therefore referred the case to the Senate for trial. However, Silvanus' grandmother, Urgulania sent Silvanus a dagger, encouraging him to commit suicide, which he duly did. Shortly after the murder of Apronia, his first wife was "charged with having caused her husband's insanity by magical incantations and potions", but was acquitted.

During his lifetime, it is probable that Silvanus adopted Tiberius Plautius Silvanus Aelianus, who Syme has suggested was the son of Lucius Aelius Lamia, consul in 3 AD. Plautius was a minor character in the Robert Graves novel I, Claudius, where it is implied that his second wife was murdered by an admirer of his first.
