= Claudius =

Roman emperor from AD 41 to 54

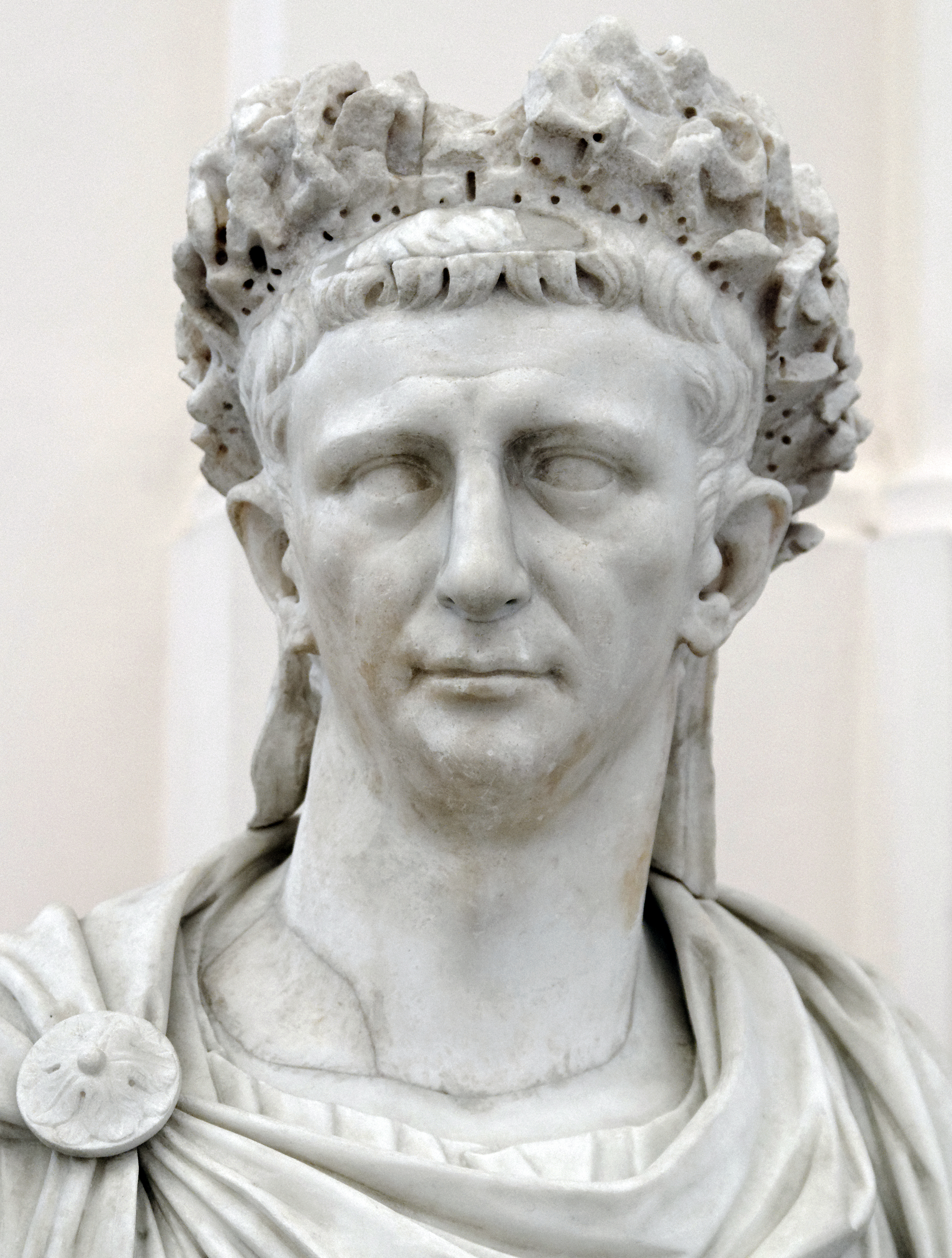
- Roman marble bust of Claudius, wearing a corona civica, Naples National Archaeological Museum

Roman emperor
- Reign: 24 January 41 – 13 October 54
- Predecessor: Caligula
- Successor: Nero
- Born: Tiberius Claudius Drusus; 1 August 10 BC; Lugdunum, Gallia Lugdunensis
- Died: 13 October AD 54 (aged 63); Rome, Italy
- Burial: Mausoleum of Augustus
- Spouses: Plautia Urgulanilla; Aelia Paetina; Valeria Messalina; Julia Agrippina
- Issue among others: Claudius Drusus; Claudia Antonia; Claudia Octavia; Britannicus; Nero (adopted)
Names
- Tiberius Claudius Nero Germanicus (Note: Claudius was born as 'Tiberius Claudius Drusus' and changed his name after his elder brother was adopted into the Julii following Drusus's death. Simpson and Hurley suggest that he added the 'Germanicus' in 9 BC by senatorial decree and switched 'Drusus' for 'Nero' when he became head of the family Claudii Nerones in AD 4. Stuart and Levick somewhat ignore Suetonius and propose that his name was always Ti. Claudius Nero, and that he added Germanicus only in AD 4.)
Regnal name
- Tiberius Claudius Caesar Augustus Germanicus
- Dynasty: Julio-Claudian
- Father: Nero Claudius Drusus
- Mother: Antonia the Younger

Tiberius Claudius Caesar Augustus Germanicus (Note: Sometimes referred to as Claudius I, in reference to the later emperor (Claudius II).) (/ˈklɔːdiəs/ KLAW-dee-əs; Classical Latin: [tɪˈbɛri.ʊs ˈkɫau̯di.ʊs ˈkae̯sar au̯ˈɡʊstʊs ɡɛrˈmaːnɪkʊs]; 1 August 10 BC – 13 October AD 54), or simply Claudius, was a Roman emperor, ruling from AD 41 until his death in AD 54. The fourth ruler of the Julio-Claudian dynasty, Claudius was born to Drusus the Elder, the brother of Emperor Tiberius, and Antonia Minor at Lugdunum in Roman Gaul, where his father was stationed as a military legate. He was the first Roman emperor to be born outside Italy.

As he had a limp, a stammer, and a tremor due to an illness he suffered when young, Claudius was ostracized by his family and was excluded from public office until his consulship (which was shared with his nephew, Caligula, in AD 37). His infirmity probably saved him from the fate of many other nobles during the purges throughout the reigns of Tiberius and Caligula, as potential enemies did not see him as a serious threat. His survival led to him being declared emperor by the Praetorian Guard after Caligula's assassination, at which point he was the last adult male of his family.

Despite his lack of experience, Claudius was an able and efficient administrator. He expanded the imperial bureaucracy to include freedmen, and helped restore the empire's finances after the excesses of Caligula's reign. He was also an ambitious builder, constructing new roads, aqueducts, and canals across the Empire. During his reign, the Empire started its successful conquest of Britain. Having a personal interest in law, he presided at public trials, and issued edicts daily. He was seen as vulnerable throughout his reign, particularly by elements of the nobility. Claudius was constantly forced to shore up his position, which resulted in the deaths of many senators. Those events damaged his reputation among the ancient writers, though more recent historians have revised that opinion. Many authors contend that he was murdered by his own wife, Agrippina the Younger. After his death at the age of 63, his grandnephew and legally adopted step-son, Nero, succeeded him as emperor.

== Name ==
As a consequence of Roman customs, society, and personal preference, Claudius's full name varied throughout his life:

- Tiberius Claudius Drusi. f. Ti. n. Drusus, the cognomen Drusus being inherited from his father as his brother Germanicus, as the eldest son, inherited the cognomen Nero when their uncle the future Emperor Tiberius was adopted by Augustus into the Julii Caesares and the victory name (agnomen) Germanicus from their father.
- Tiberius Claudius Drusi. f. Ti. n. Nero, the cognomen Nero devolved to Claudius as the head of the Claudii Nerones after his elder brother was adopted by Tiberius as required by Augustus into the Julii Caesares in AD 9. Germanicus kept the victory title Germanicus as a praenomen, becoming Germanicus Julius Caesar. His son, Caligula, was known as Gaius Julius Caesar Germanicus, keeping the victory title, and later was known as Gaius Caesar Augustus Germanicus. Some authorities consider that his full name may have been Tiberius Claudius Drusus Nero Germanicus. (Note: Simpson and Hurley suggest that he added the 'Germanicus' in 9 BC by senatorial decree and switched 'Drusus' for 'Nero' when he became head of the family Claudii Nerones in AD 4. Stuart and Levick somewhat ignore Suetonius and propose that his name was always Ti. Claudius Nero, and that he added Germanicus only in AD 4.)
- Tiberius Claudius Caesar Augustus Germanicus While Claudius had never been formally adopted either by Augustus or his successors, he was nevertheless the grandson of Augustus's sister Octavia, and so he felt that he had the right of family. He also adopted the name "Augustus" as the two previous emperors had done at their accessions. He kept the honorific "Germanicus" to display the connection with his heroic brother and father. He deified his paternal grandmother Livia to highlight her position as wife of the divine Augustus. Claudius frequently used the term "filius Drusi" (son of Drusus) in his titles, to remind the people of his legendary father and lay claim to his reputation.

== Family and youth ==
=== Early life ===
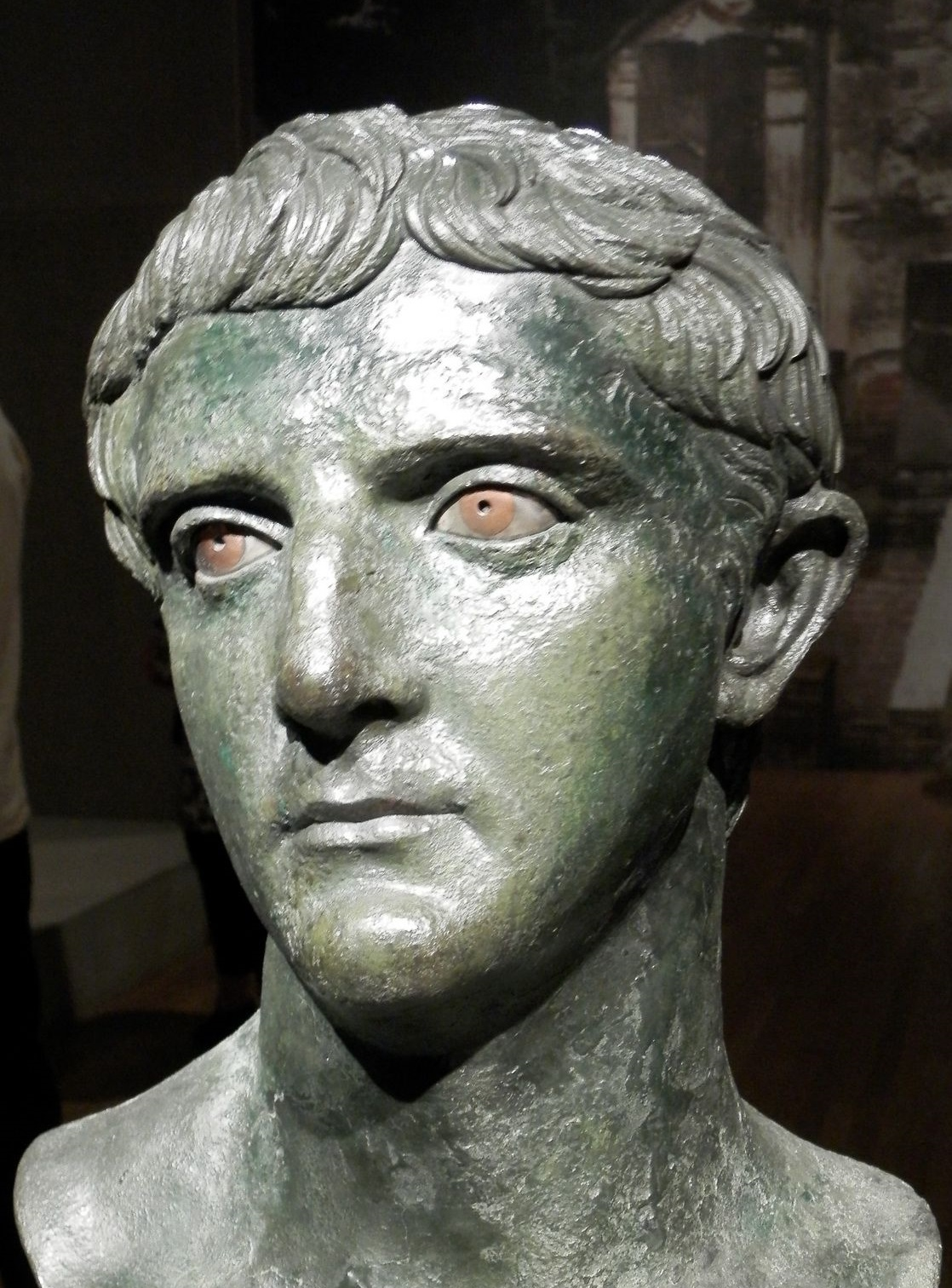
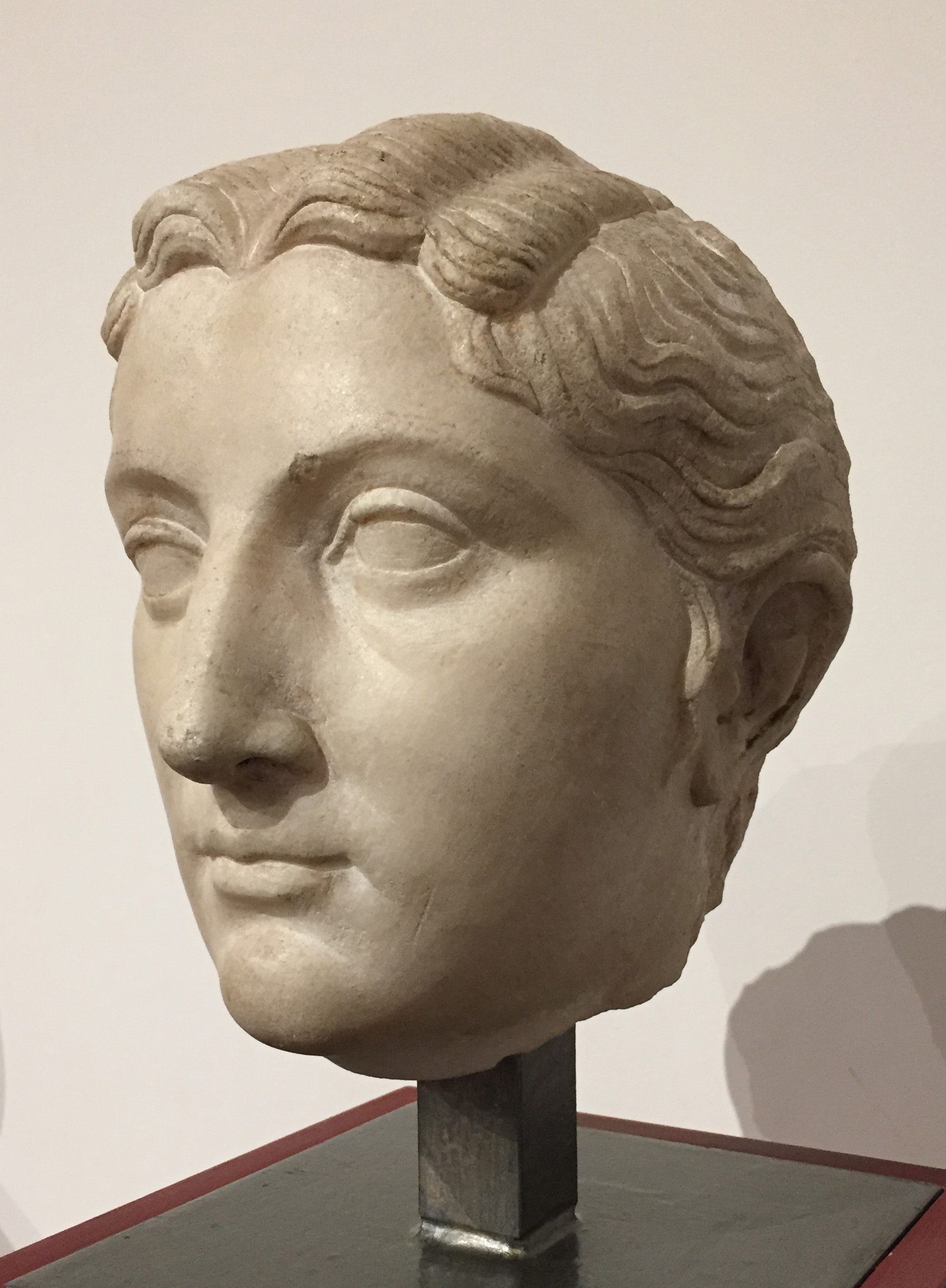
Busts of Nero Claudius Drusus and Antonia Minor, Claudius's parents

Claudius was born on 1 August 10 BC at Lugdunum (modern Lyon, France). He had two older siblings, Germanicus and Livilla. His mother, Antonia Minor, may have had two other children who died young. Claudius's maternal grandparents were Mark Antony and Octavia Minor, Augustus's sister, and he was therefore the great-great-grandnephew of Gaius Julius Caesar. His paternal grandparents were Livia, Augustus's third wife, and Tiberius Claudius Nero. During his reign, Claudius revived the rumour that his father Nero Claudius Drusus was actually the illegitimate son of Augustus, to give the appearance that Augustus was Claudius's paternal grandfather.

In 9 BC, Claudius's father Drusus died on campaign in Germania from a fall from a horse. Claudius was then raised by his mother, who never remarried. When his disability became evident, the relationship with his family turned sour. Antonia referred to him as a monster, and used him as a standard for stupidity. She seems to have passed her son off to his grandmother Livia for a number of years.

Livia was a little kinder, but nevertheless sent Claudius short, angry letters of reproof. He was put under the care of a former mule-driver to keep him disciplined, under the logic that his condition was due to laziness and a lack of willpower. However, by the time he reached his teenage years, his symptoms apparently waned and his family began to take some notice of his scholarly interests. In AD 7, Livy was hired to tutor Claudius in history, with the assistance of Sulpicius Flavus. He spent a lot of his time with the latter, as well as the philosopher Athenodorus. Augustus, according to a letter, was surprised at the clarity of Claudius's oratory.

=== Public life ===
Claudius's work as a historian damaged his prospects for advancement in public life. According to Vincent Scramuzza and others, he began work on a history of the Civil Wars that was either too truthful or too critical of Octavian, then reigning as Caesar Augustus. In either case, it was far too early for such an account, and may have only served to remind Augustus that Claudius was Antony's descendant. His mother and grandmother quickly put a stop to it, and this may have convinced them that Claudius was not fit for public office, since he could not be trusted to toe the existing party line.

When Claudius returned to the narrative later in life, he skipped over the wars of the Second Triumvirate altogether; but the damage was done, and his family pushed him into the background. When the Arch of Pavia was erected to honour the Imperial clan in AD 8, Claudius's name (now Tiberius Claudius Nero Germanicus after his elevation to pater familias of the Claudii Nerones on the adoption of his brother) was inscribed on the edge, past the deceased princes, Gaius and Lucius, and Germanicus's children. There is some speculation that the inscription was added by Claudius himself decades later, and that he originally did not appear at all.

When Augustus died in AD 14, Claudius – then aged 23 – appealed to his uncle Tiberius to allow him to begin the cursus honorum. Tiberius, the new Emperor, responded by granting Claudius consular ornaments. Claudius requested office once more and was snubbed. Since the new emperor was no more generous than the old, Claudius gave up hope of public office and retired to a scholarly, private life. Despite the disdain of the Imperial family, it seems that from very early on the general public respected Claudius. At Augustus's death, the equites, or knights, chose Claudius to head their delegation. When his house burned down, the Senate demanded it be rebuilt at public expense. They also requested that Claudius be allowed to debate in the Senate. Tiberius turned down both motions, but the sentiment remained.

During the period immediately after the death of Tiberius's son, Drusus the Younger (Drusus Julius Caesar), Claudius was pushed by some quarters as a potential heir to the throne. This again suggests the political nature of his exclusion from public life. However, as this was also the period during which the power and terror of the commander of the Praetorian Guard, Sejanus, was at its peak, Claudius chose to downplay this possibility. After the death of Tiberius, the new emperor Caligula (the son of Claudius's brother Germanicus) recognized Claudius to be of some use. He appointed Claudius his co-consul in AD 37 to emphasize the memory of Caligula's deceased father Germanicus. Despite this, Caligula tormented his uncle: playing practical jokes, charging him enormous sums of money, humiliating him before the Senate, and the like. According to Cassius Dio, Claudius became sickly and thin by the end of Caligula's reign, most likely due to stress. A possible surviving portrait of Claudius from this period may support this.

=== Assassination of Caligula and Declaration of Claudius as Emperor (AD 41) ===
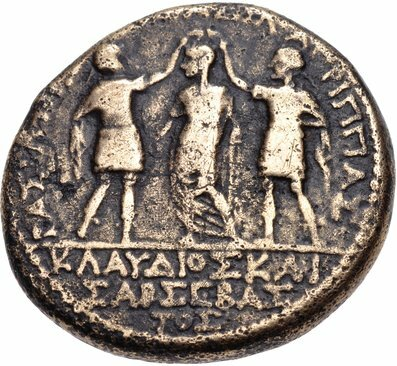
A coin of Herod of Chalcis, showing him with his brother Agrippa of Judaea crowning Claudius, AD 43.

On 24 January AD 41, Caligula was assassinated in a conspiracy involving Cassius Chaerea – a military tribune in the Praetorian Guard – and several senators. There is no evidence that Claudius had a direct hand in the assassination, although it has been argued that he knew about the plot – particularly since he left the scene of the crime shortly before his nephew was murdered. However, after the deaths of Caligula's wife and daughter, it became apparent that Cassius intended to go beyond the terms of the conspiracy and wipe out the Imperial family.

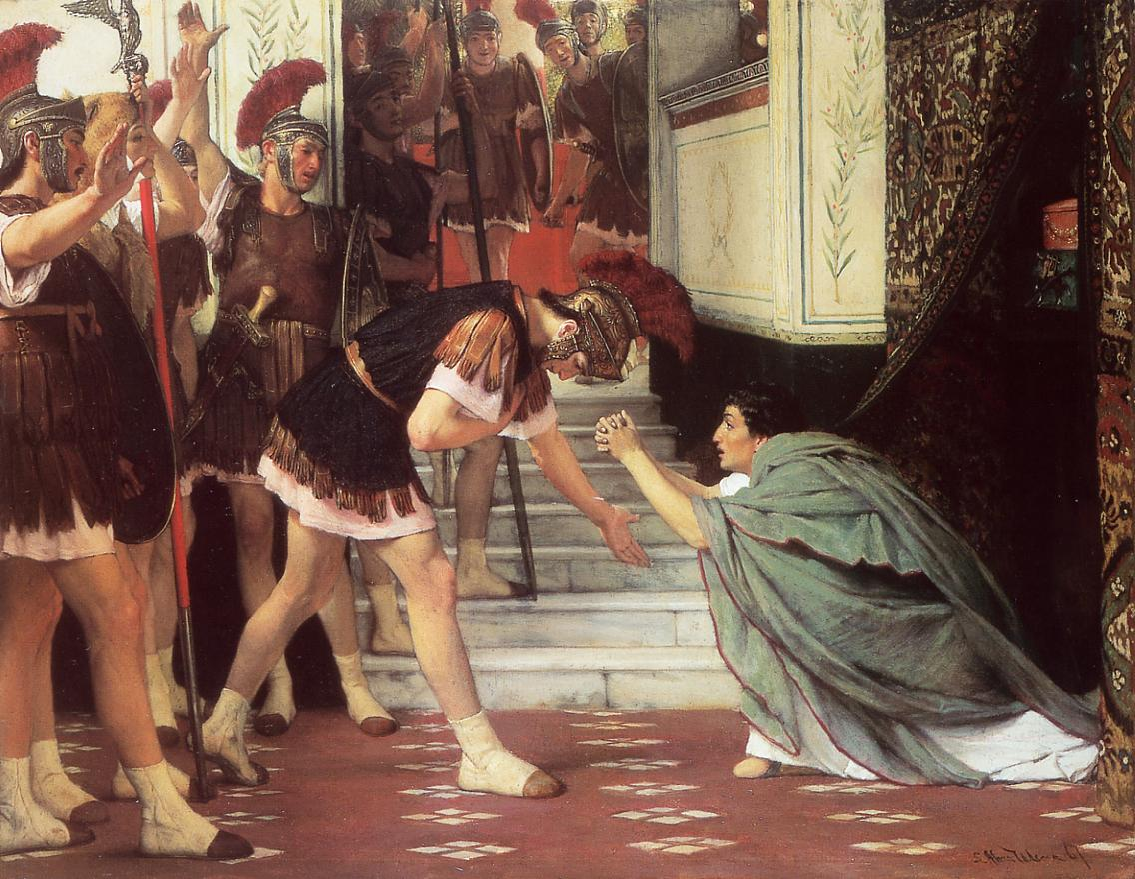
Proclaiming Claudius Emperor, 1867.

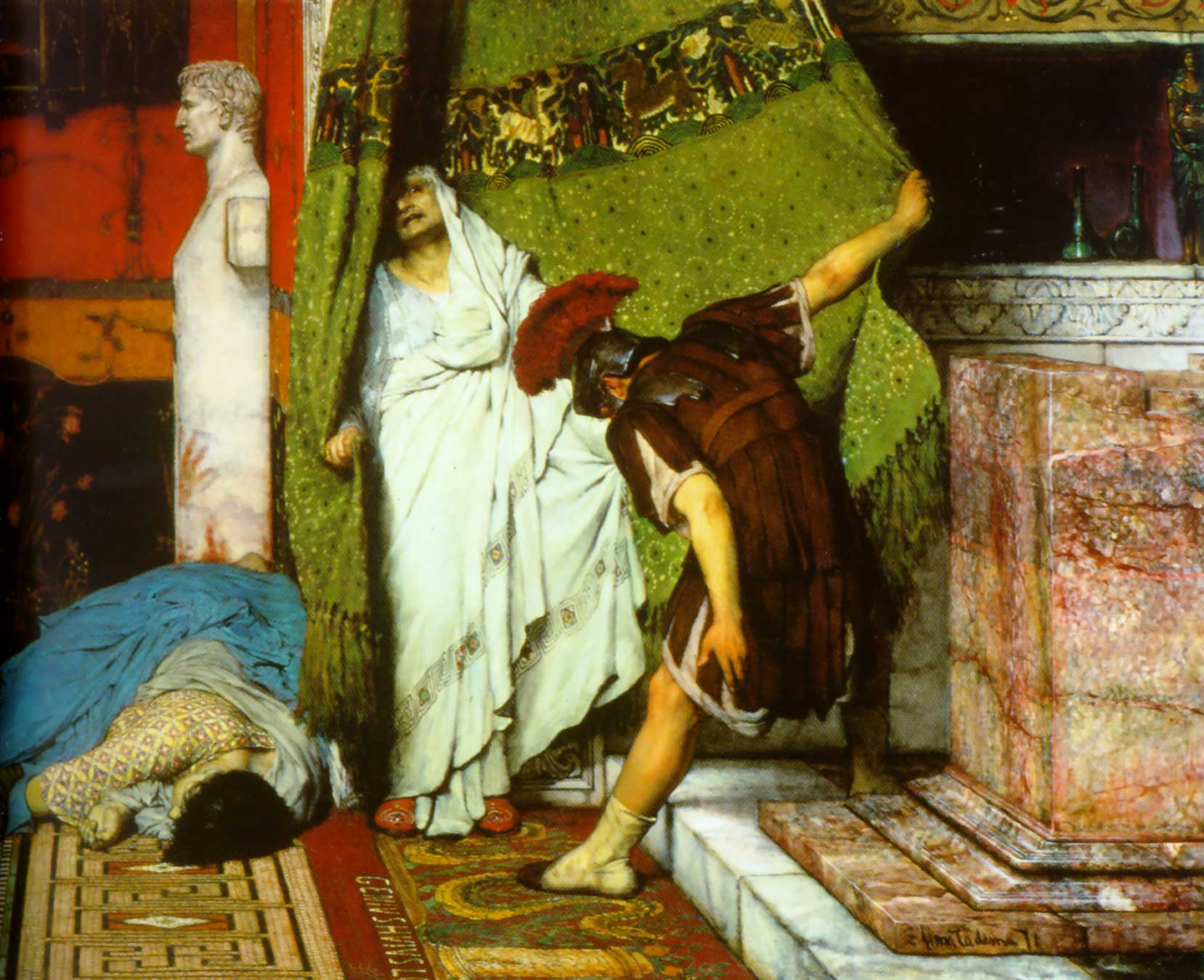
Detail from A Roman Emperor 41 AD, c. 1871.

Two drastically different oil paintings by Lawrence Alma-Tadema of Claudius being proclaimed emperor by Gratus.

In the chaos following the murder, Claudius witnessed the German guard cut down several uninvolved noblemen, including many of his friends. He fled to the palace to hide. According to tradition, a Praetorian named Gratus found him hiding behind a curtain and suddenly proclaimed him princeps. Claudius was spirited away to the Praetorian camp and put under their protection.

The Senate met and debated a change of government, but this devolved into an argument over which of them would be the new princeps. When they heard of the Praetorians' claim, they demanded that Claudius be delivered to them for approval, but he refused, sensing the danger that would come with complying. Some historians, particularly Josephus, claim that Claudius was directed in his actions by the Judaean King Herod Agrippa. However, an earlier version of events by the same ancient author downplays Agrippa's role, so it remains uncertain. Eventually the Senate was forced to give in. In return, Claudius granted a general amnesty, although he executed a few junior officers involved in the conspiracy. The actual assassins, including Cassius Chaerea and Julius Lupus, the murderer of Caligula's wife and daughter, were put to death to ensure Claudius's own safety and as a future deterrent.

Since Claudius was the first emperor proclaimed on the initiative of the Praetorian Guard instead of the Senate, his repute suffered at the hands of commentators (such as Seneca the Younger). Moreover, they accused him of being the first emperor to resort to bribery as a means to secure army loyalty and rewarded the soldiers of the Praetorian Guard that had elevated him with 15,000 sesterces, although Tiberius and Augustus had both left gifts to the army and guard in their wills and upon Caligula's death the same would have been expected, even if no will existed. Claudius remained grateful to the guard, issuing coins with tributes to the Praetorians in the early part of his reign.

== Emperor ==
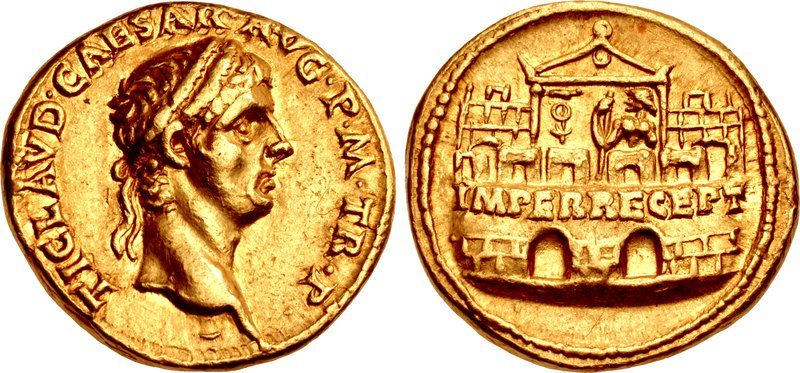
Aureus struck at the Lugdunum (Lyon) mint, AD 41. The reverse commemorates the "reception of the emperor" (imperator receptus) at the Praetorian Camp and the protection the Praetorian Guard afforded him in the days following the assassination of Caligula. Issued over a number of years in both gold and silver, these types of coins were struck to serve as part of the annual military payments Claudius had promised the Guard in return for their role in raising him to the throne. Caption: TI. CLAVD. CAESAR AVG. P. M., TR. P. / IMPER. RECEPT.

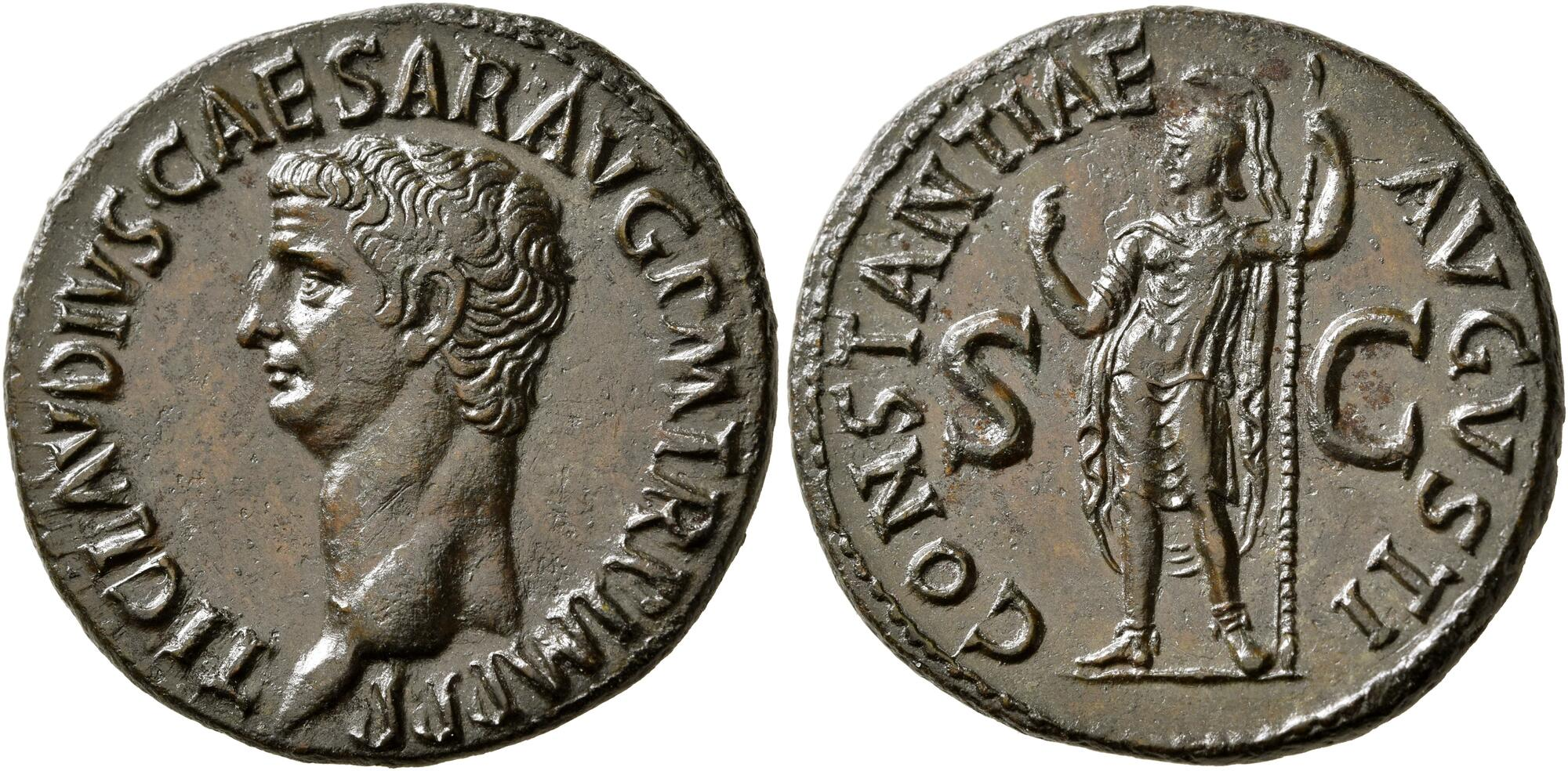
This denarius emphasizes Claudius's clemency after Caligula's murder. The depiction of the goddess Pax-Nemesis, representing subdued vengeance, would be used by many later emperors; she is depicted holding a Caduceus over a serpent. Caption: TI. CLAVDIVS CAESAR AVG. P. M. TR. P. IMP. P. P. / CONSTANTIAE AVGVSTI. The letters "S C" mean senatus consultum ('decree of the senate').

Claudius took several steps to legitimize his rule against potential usurpers, most of them emphasizing his place within the Julio-Claudian family. He adopted the name "Caesar" as a cognomen, as the name still carried great weight with the populace. To do so, he dropped the cognomen "Nero", which he had adopted as pater familias of the Claudii Nerones when his brother Germanicus was adopted. As Pharaoh of Egypt, Claudius adopted the royal titulary Tiberios Klaudios, Autokrator Heqaheqau Meryasetptah, Kanakht Djediakhshuemakhet ("Tiberius Claudius, Emperor and ruler of rulers, beloved of Isis and Ptah, the strong bull of the stable moon on the horizon").

While Claudius had never been formally adopted either by Augustus or his successors, he was nevertheless the grandson of Augustus's sister Octavia, and so he felt that he had the right of family. He also adopted the name "Augustus" as the two previous emperors had done at their accessions. He kept the honorific "Germanicus" to display the connection with his heroic brother. He deified his paternal grandmother Livia to highlight her position as wife of the divine Augustus. Claudius frequently used the term "filius Drusi" (son of Drusus) in his titles, to remind the people of his legendary father and lay claim to his reputation.

Pliny the Elder noted, according to the 1938 Loeb Classical Library translation by Harris Rackham, "... many people do not allow any gems in a signet-ring, and seal with the gold itself; this was a fashion invented when Claudius Cæsar was emperor."

=== Senate ===
Because of the circumstances of his accession, Claudius took great pains to please the Senate. During regular sessions, the Emperor sat among the Senate body, speaking in turn. When introducing a law, he sat on a bench between the consuls in his position as holder of the power of Tribune (the Emperor could not officially serve as a Tribune of the Plebes since he was a patrician, but this was a power taken by previous rulers, which he continued). He refused to accept all his predecessors' titles (including Imperator) at the beginning of his reign, preferring to earn them in due course. He allowed the Senate to issue its own bronze coinage for the first time since Augustus. He also restored the peaceful Imperial provinces of Macedonia and Achaea as senatorial provinces.

Claudius set about remodeling the Senate into a more efficient, representative body. He chided the senators about their reluctance to debate bills introduced by himself, as noted in the fragments of a surviving speech:

If you accept these proposals, Conscript Fathers, say so at once and simply, in accordance with your convictions. If you do not accept them, find alternatives, but do so here and now; or if you wish to take time for consideration, take it, provided you do not forget that you must be ready to pronounce your opinion whenever you may be summoned to meet. It ill befits the dignity of the Senate that the consul designate should repeat the phrases of the consuls word for word as his opinion, and that every one else should merely say 'I approve', and that then, after leaving, the assembly should announce 'We debated'.

In 47, he assumed the office of censor with Lucius Vitellius, which had been allowed to lapse for some time. He struck out the names of many senators and equites who no longer met qualifications, but showed respect by allowing them to resign in advance. At the same time, he sought to admit to the senate eligible men from the provinces. The Lyon Tablet preserves his speech on the admittance of Gallic senators, in which he addresses the Senate with reverence but also with criticism for their disdain of these men. He even joked about how the Senate had admitted members from beyond Gallia Narbonensis (Lyon), i.e. himself. He also increased the number of patricians by adding new families to the dwindling number of noble lines. Here he followed the precedent of Lucius Junius Brutus and Julius Caesar. Nevertheless, many in the Senate remained hostile to Claudius, and many plots were made on his life. This hostility carried over into the historical accounts. As a result, Claudius reduced the Senate's power for the sake of efficiency. The administration of Ostia was turned over to an Imperial procurator after construction of the port. Administration of many of the empire's financial concerns was turned over to Imperial appointees and freedmen. This led to further resentment and suggestions that these same freedmen were ruling the Emperor.

=== Secretariat and centralization of powers ===
Claudius was hardly the first emperor to use freedmen to help with the day-to-day running of the Empire. He has however become famous for the new extents at which he made use of such men in the administration of the government, forced by the centralization of the powers of the princeps and not wanting free-born magistrates to serve under him as if they were not peers. The secretariat was divided into bureaus, with each being placed under the leadership of one freedman. Narcissus was the secretary of correspondence. Pallas became the secretary of the treasury. Callistus became secretary of justice. There was a fourth bureau for miscellaneous issues, which was put under Polybius until his execution for treason. The freedmen could also officially speak for the Emperor, as when Narcissus addressed the troops in Claudius's stead before the conquest of Britain.

Since these were important positions, the senators were aghast at their being placed in the hands of former slaves and "well-known eunuchs". If freedmen had total control of money, letters and law, it seemed it would not be hard for them to manipulate the Emperor. This is exactly the accusation put forth by ancient sources. However, these same sources admit that the freedmen were loyal to Claudius. He had shown himself to be similarly appreciative of their help, giving them due credit for policies which they advised; but punished them with just force if they showed treacherous inclinations, as was the case of Polybius and Pallas's brother, Felix. There is no evidence that the character of Claudius's policies and edicts changed with the rise and fall of the various freedmen, suggesting that he was firmly in control throughout. Regardless of the extent of their political power, the freedmen did manage to amass wealth through their positions. Pliny the Elder describes several of them as being richer than Crassus, the richest man of the Republican era.

=== Expansion of the Empire ===
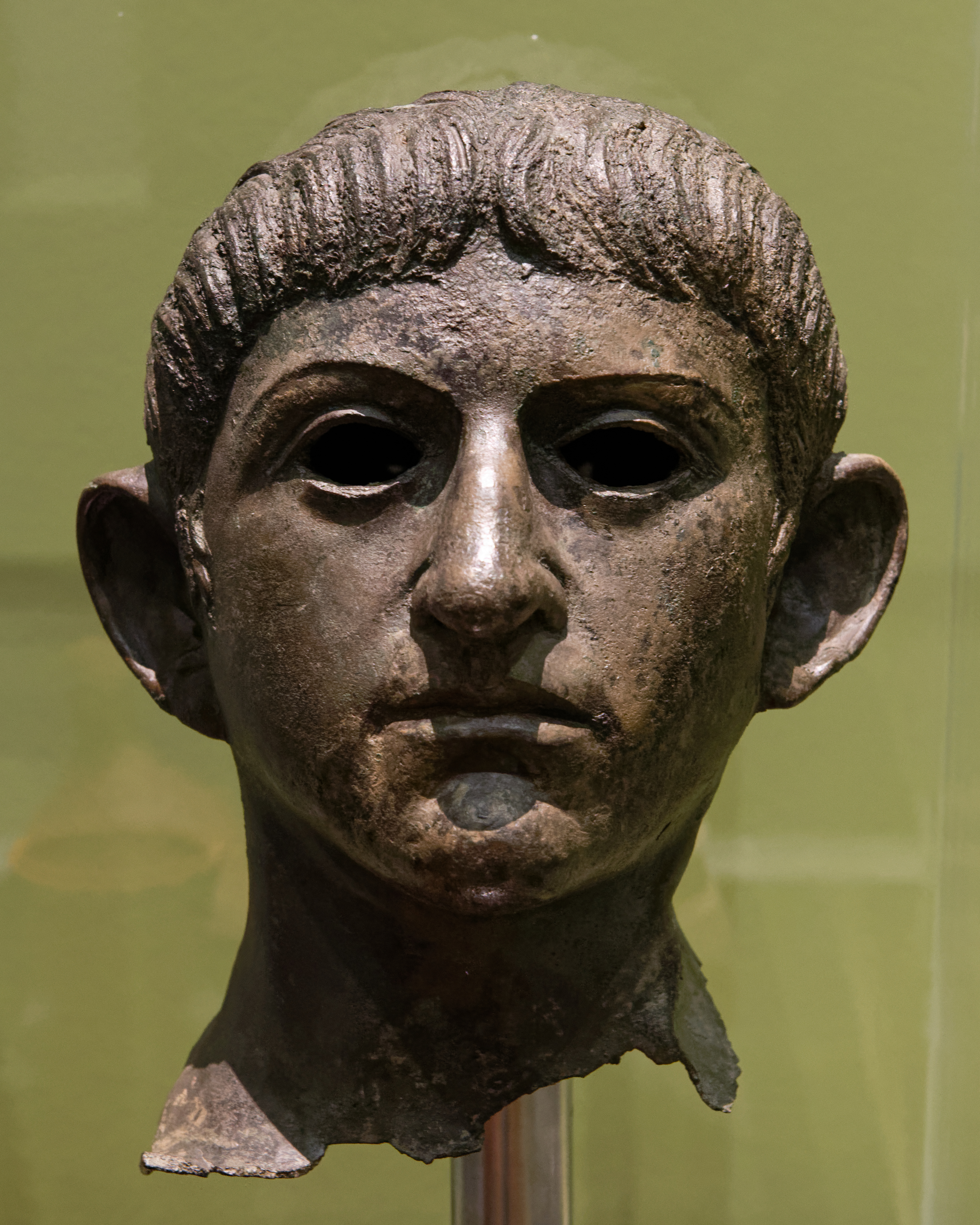
Bronze head of Claudius found in the River Alde at Rendham, near Saxmundham, Suffolk (British Museum), reputedly looted from the Temple of Claudius in Colonia Victricensis (now Colchester) during the Boudican revolt.

Claudius conducted a census in AD 48 that found 5,984,072 (adult male) Roman citizens (women, children, slaves, and free adult males without Roman citizenship were not counted), an increase of around a million since the census conducted at Augustus's death. He had helped increase this number through the foundation of Roman colonies that were granted blanket citizenship. These colonies were often made out of existing communities, especially those with elites who could rally the populace to the Roman cause. Several colonies were placed in new provinces or on the border of the Empire to secure Roman holdings as quickly as possible.

Additionally under Claudius, the Empire underwent its first major territorial expansion since the reign of Augustus. The provinces of Thrace, Noricum, Lycia, and Judea were annexed (or put under direct rule) under various circumstances during his term. The annexation of Mauretania, begun under Caligula, was completed after the defeat of rebel forces, as well as the official division of the former client kingdom into two Imperial provinces.

==== British campaign ====
The most far-reaching conquest however was that of Britannia: In AD 43, Claudius sent Aulus Plautius with four legions to Britain (Britannia) after an appeal from an ousted tribal ally. Britain was an attractive target for Rome because of its mines and the potential of slave labor, as well as being a haven for Gallic rebels. Claudius himself traveled to the island after the completion of initial offensives, bringing with him reinforcements. Although it has been claimed that Claudius brought elephants with him to Britain, this claim has been doubted. The Roman colonia of Colonia Claudia Victricensis was established as the provincial capital of the newly established province of Britannia at Camulodunum, where a large temple was dedicated in his honour.

He left Britain after 16 days, but remained in the provinces for some time. The Senate granted him a triumph for his efforts. Only members of the Imperial family were allowed such honours, but Claudius subsequently lifted this restriction for some of his conquering generals. He was granted the honorific "Britannicus" but only accepted it on behalf of his son, never using the title himself. When the British general Caractacus was captured in AD 50, Claudius granted him clemency. Caractacus lived out his days on land provided by the Roman state, an unusual end for an enemy commander.

=== Public works ===
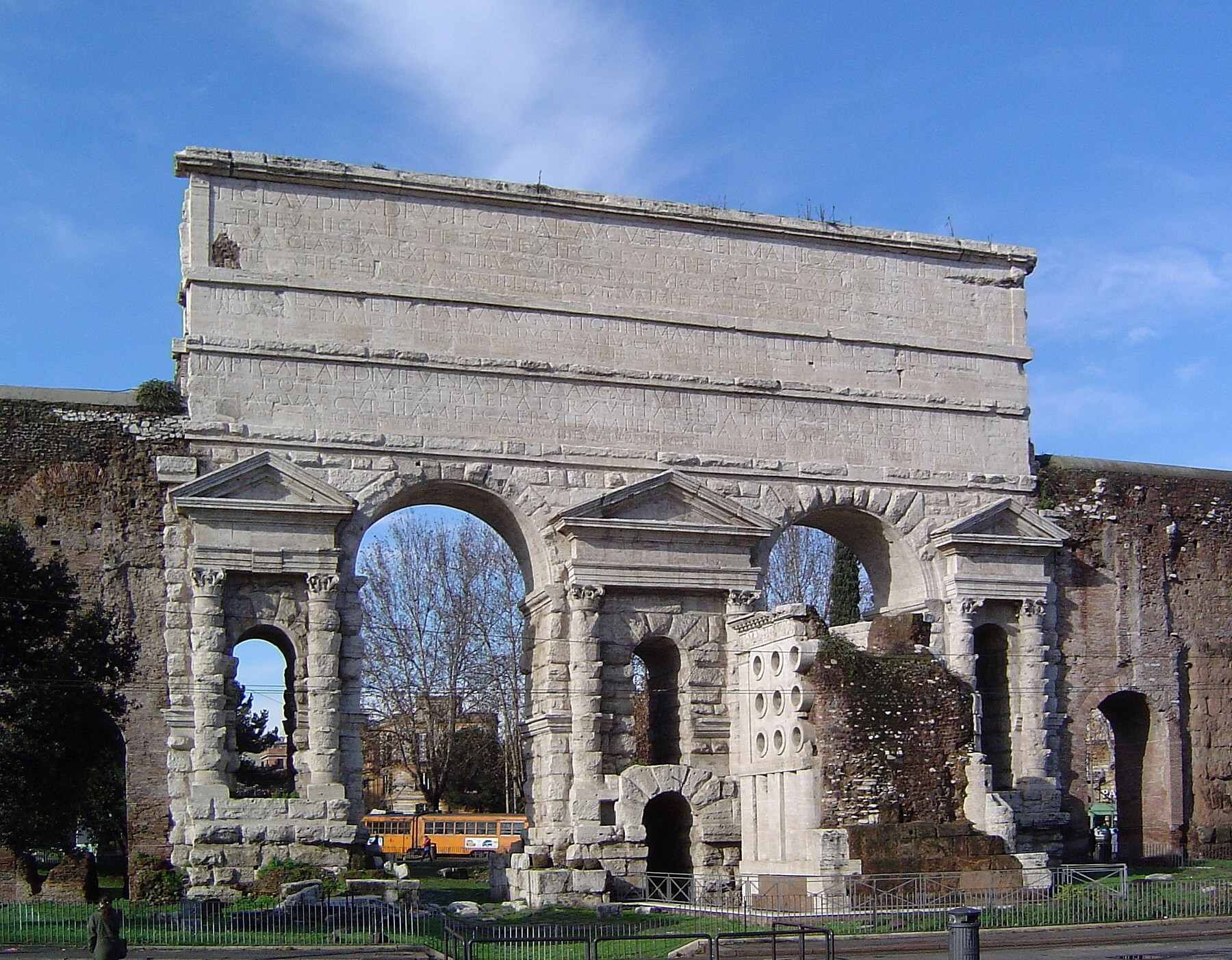
The Porta Maggiore in Rome: remains of aqueducts Aqua Claudia and Aqua Anio Novus

Claudius embarked on many public works throughout his reign, both in the capital and in the provinces. He built or finished two aqueducts, the Aqua Claudia, begun by Caligula, and the Aqua Anio Novus. These entered the city in AD 52 and met at the Porta Maggiore. He also restored a third, the Aqua Virgo.

He paid special attention to transportation. Throughout Italy and the provinces he built roads and canals. Among these was a large canal leading from the Rhine to the sea, as well as a road from Italy to Germany – both begun by his father, Drusus. Closer to Rome, he built a navigable canal on the Tiber, leading to Portus, his new port just north of Ostia. This port was constructed in a semicircle with two moles and a lighthouse at its mouth, reducing flooding in Rome.

The port at Ostia was part of Claudius's solution to the constant grain shortages that occurred in winter, after the Roman shipping season. The other part of his solution was to insure the ships of grain merchants who were willing to risk travelling to Egypt in the off-season. He also granted their sailors special privileges, including citizenship and exemption from the Lex Papia Poppaea, a law that regulated marriage. In addition, he repealed the taxes that Caligula had instituted on food, and further reduced taxes on communities suffering drought or famine.

The last part of Claudius's plan to avoid famine was to increase the amount of arable land in Italy. This was to be achieved by draining the Fucine lake, also making the nearby river navigable year-round. A serious famine is mentioned in the Book of Acts as taking place during Claudius's reign, and had been prophesied by a Christian called Agabus while visiting Antioch.

A tunnel was dug through the lake bed, but the plan was a failure. The tunnel was crooked and not large enough to carry the water, which caused it to back up when opened. The resultant flood washed out a large gladiatorial exhibition held to commemorate the opening, causing Claudius to run for his life along with the other spectators. The draining of the lake continued to present a problem well into the Middle Ages. It was finally achieved by the Prince Torlonia in the 19th century, producing over 160,000 acres (650 km^{2}) of new arable land; he expanded the Claudian tunnel to three times its original size.

=== Religious reforms ===
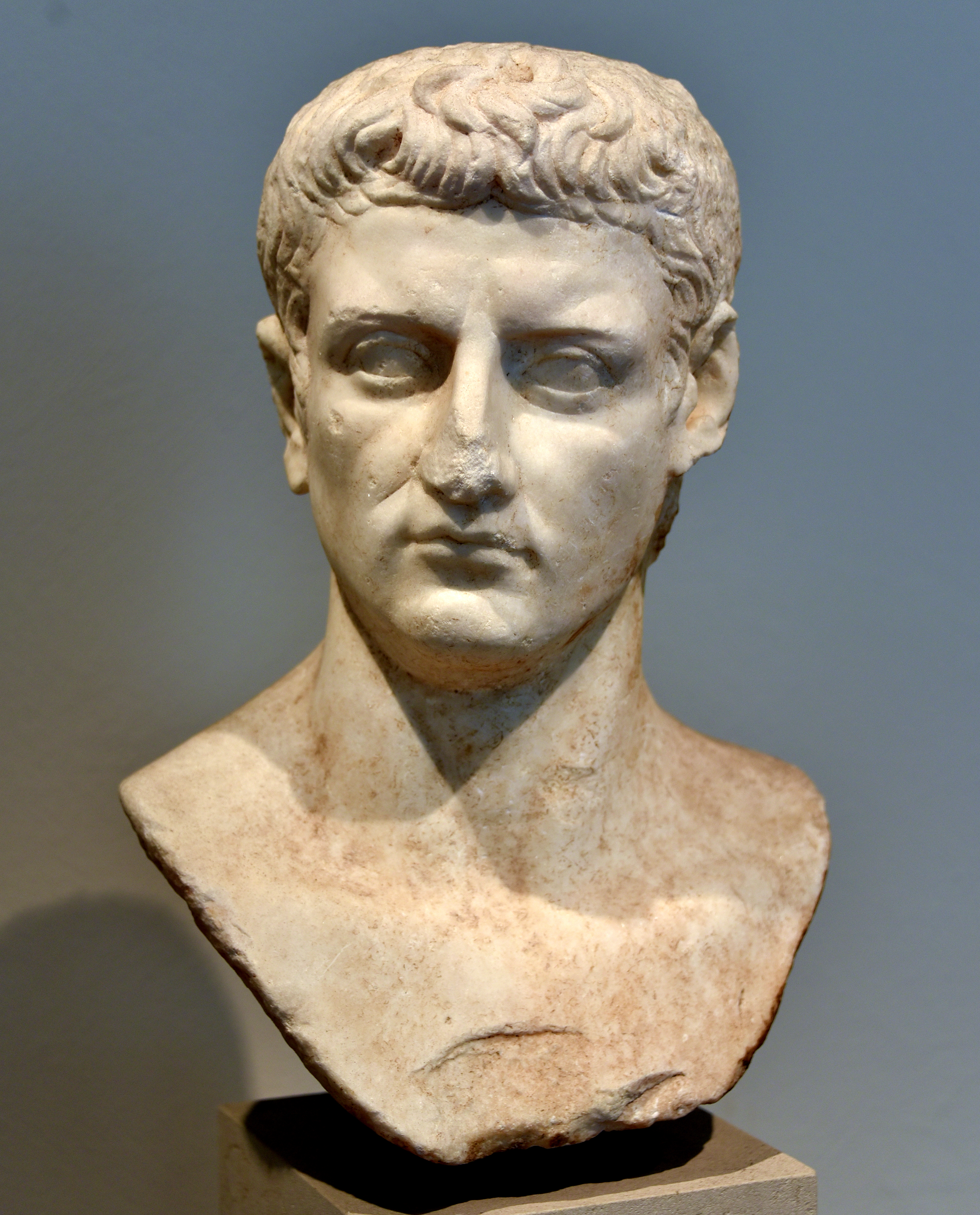
Portrait bust of Claudius, reworked from a statue of Caligula (Altes Museum, Berlin)

Claudius, as the author of a treatise on Augustus's religious reforms, thought himself to be in a good position to institute some of his own. He had strong opinions about the proper form for state religion. He refused the request of Alexandrian Greeks to dedicate a temple to his divinity, saying that only gods may choose new gods; he restored lost days to festivals and got rid of many extraneous celebrations added by Caligula. He also re-established old observances and archaic language.

Claudius was concerned with the spread of eastern mysteries within the city and searched for more Roman replacements. He emphasized the Eleusinian Mysteries, which had been practiced by so many during the Republic. He expelled foreign astrologers, and at the same time rehabilitated the old Roman soothsayers (known as haruspices) as a replacement. He was especially hard on Druidism, because of its incompatibility with the Roman state religion and its proselytizing activities.

=== Judicial and legislative affairs ===
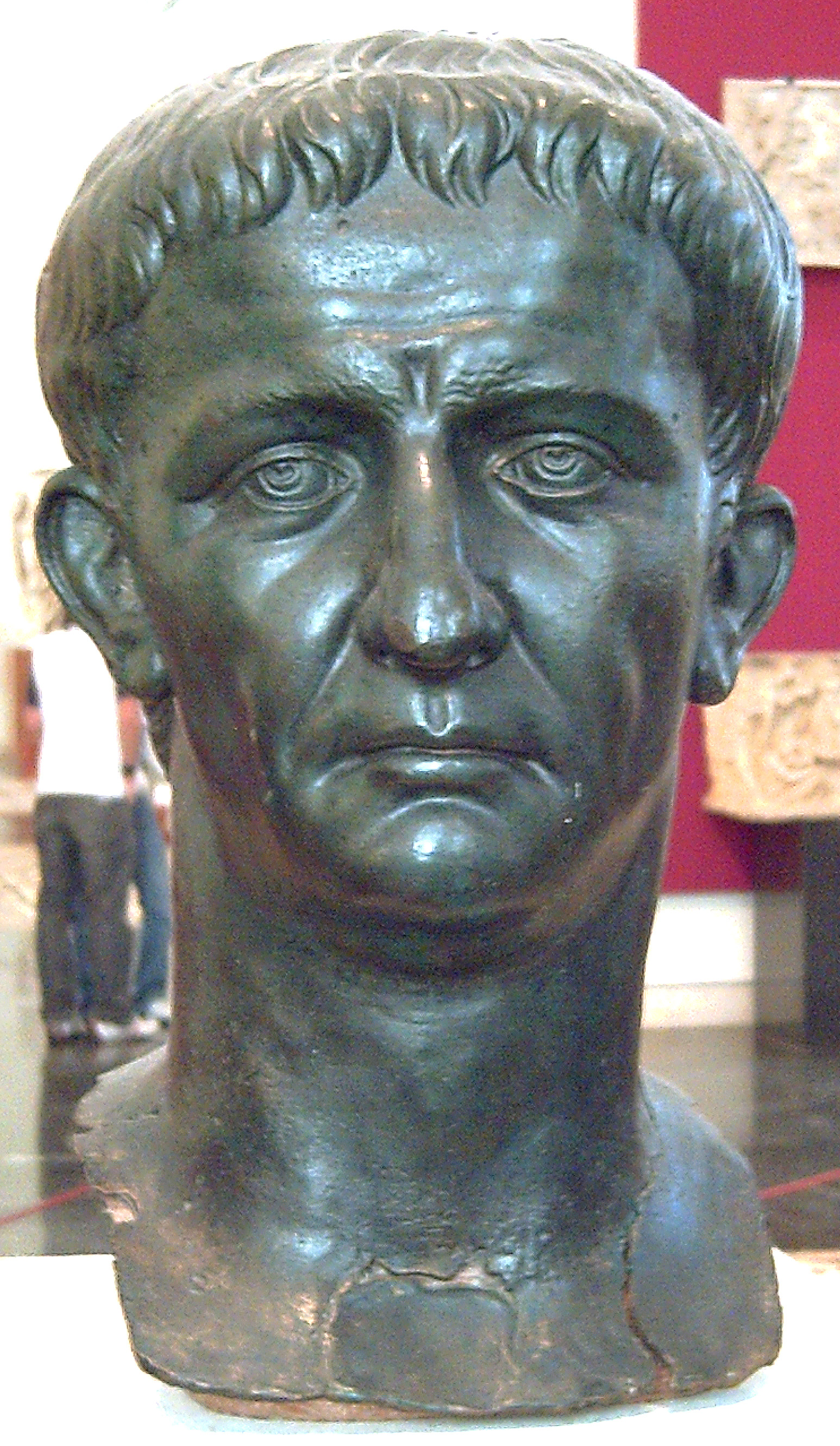
Emperor Claudius in a bronze statue at the National Museum of Archaeology (Madrid)

Claudius personally judged many of the legal cases tried during his reign. Ancient historians have many complaints about this, stating that his judgments were variable and sometimes did not follow the law. He was also easily swayed. Nevertheless, Claudius paid detailed attention to the operation of the judicial system. He extended the summer court session, as well as the winter term, by shortening the traditional breaks. Claudius also made a law requiring plaintiffs to remain in the city while their cases were pending, as defendants had previously been required to do. These measures had the effect of clearing out the docket. The minimum age for jurors was also raised to 25 to ensure a more experienced jury pool.

Claudius also settled disputes in the provinces. He freed the island of Rhodes from Roman rule for their good faith and exempted Ilium (Troy) from taxes. Early in his reign, the Greeks and Jews of Alexandria each sent him embassies after riots broke out between the two communities. This resulted in the famous "Letter to the Alexandrians", which reaffirmed Jewish rights in the city but forbade them to move in more families en masse. According to Josephus, he then reaffirmed the rights and freedoms of all the Jews in the Empire. However, Claudius also expelled Jews from the city of Rome, following disturbances allegedly instigated by Christians. This expulsion is attested to in Acts of the Apostles (18:2), and by Roman historians Suetonius and Cassius Dio along with the fifth-century Christian author Paulus Orosius.

One of Claudius's investigators discovered that many old Roman citizens based in the city of Tridentum (modern Trento) were not in fact citizens. The Emperor issued a declaration, contained in the Tabula clesiana, that they would be allowed to hold citizenship from then on, since to strip them of their status would cause major problems. However, in individual cases, Claudius punished the false assumption of citizenship harshly, making it a capital offense. Similarly, if a freedman falsely claimed equestrian rank, his property was confiscated, and "such as were ungrateful and a cause of complaint to their patrons" (in the words of Suetonius) were sold into slavery.

Numerous edicts were issued throughout Claudius's reign. These were on a number of topics, everything from medical advice to moral judgments. A famous medical example is one promoting yew juice as a cure for snakebite. Suetonius wrote that he is even said to have thought of an edict allowing public flatulence for good health. One of the more famous edicts concerned the status of sick slaves. Masters had been abandoning ailing slaves at the temple of Aesculapius on Tiber Island to die instead of providing them with medical assistance and care, and then reclaiming them if they lived. Claudius ruled that slaves who were thus abandoned and recovered after such treatment would be free. Furthermore, masters who chose to kill slaves rather than take care of them were liable to be charged with murder.

=== Public games and entertainments ===
According to Suetonius, Claudius was extraordinarily fond of games. He is said to have risen with the crowd after gladiatorial matches and given unrestrained praise to the fighters. Claudius also presided over many new and original events. Soon after coming into power he instituted games to be held in honor of his father on the latter's birthday; annual games were also held in honor of his accession, and took place at the Praetorian camp where Claudius had first been proclaimed Emperor.

Claudius organized a performance of the Secular Games, marking the 800th anniversary of the founding of Rome. Augustus had performed the same games less than a century prior. Augustus's excuse was that the interval for the games was 110 years, not 100, but his date actually did not qualify under either reasoning. Claudius also presented staged naval battles to mark the attempted draining of the Fucine Lake, as well as many other public games and shows. At Ostia, in front of a crowd of spectators, Claudius fought an orca which was trapped in the harbour. The event was witnessed by Pliny the Elder:

A killer whale was actually seen in the harbour of Ostia in battle with the Emperor Claudius; it had come at the time when he was engaged in completing the structure of the harbour, being tempted by the wreck of a cargo of hides imported from Gaul, and in glutting itself for a number of days had furrowed a hollow in the shallow bottom and had been banked up with sand by the waves so high that it was quite unable to turn round, and while it was pursuing its food which was driven forward to the shore by the waves its back projected far above the water like a capsized boat. Caesar gave orders for a barrier of nets to be stretched between the mouths of the harbour and setting out in person with the praetorian cohorts afforded a show to the Roman public, the soldiery hurling lances from the vessels against the creatures when they leapt up alongside, and we saw one of the boats sunk from being filled with water owing to a beast's snorting.

Claudius also restored and adorned many public venues in Rome. At the Circus Maximus, the turning posts and starting stalls were replaced in marble and embellished, and an embankment was probably added to prevent flooding of the track. Claudius also reinforced or extended the seating rules that reserved front seating at the Circus for senators. He rebuilt Pompey's Theatre after it had been destroyed by fire, organising special fights at the re-dedication, which he observed from a special platform in the orchestra box.

=== Plots and coup attempts ===
Several coup attempts were made during Claudius's reign, resulting in the deaths of many senators. Appius Silanus was executed early in Claudius's reign under questionable circumstances. Shortly after this, a large rebellion was undertaken by the Senator Vinicianus and Scribonianus, the governor of Dalmatia, and gained quite a few senatorial supporters. It ultimately failed because of the reluctance of Scribonianus's troops, which led to the suicide of the main conspirators. Many other senators tried different conspiracies and were condemned. Claudius's son-in-law Pompeius Magnus was executed for his part in a conspiracy with his father Crassus Frugi. Another plot involved the consulars Lusius Saturninus, Cornelius Lupus, and Pompeius Pedo.

In AD 46, Asinius Gallus, grandson of Asinius Pollio, and Titus Statilius Taurus Corvinus were exiled for a plot hatched with several of Claudius's own freedmen. Valerius Asiaticus was executed without public trial for unknown reasons. Ancient sources say the charge was adultery, and that Claudius was tricked into issuing the punishment. However, Claudius singles out Asiaticus for special damnation in his speech on the Gauls, which dates over a year later, suggesting that the charge must have been much more serious. Asiaticus had been a claimant to the throne in the chaos following Caligula's death and a co-consul with Titus Statilius Taurus Corvinus. Most of these conspiracies took place before Claudius's term as Censor, and may have induced him to review the Senatorial rolls. The conspiracy of Gaius Silius in the year after his censorship, 48, is detailed in book 11 of Tacitus's Annals. This section of Tacitus's history narrates the alleged conspiracy of Claudius's third wife, Messalina. Suetonius states that a total of 35 senators and 300 knights were executed for offenses during Claudius's reign.

== Marriages and personal life ==
Suetonius and the other ancient authors accused Claudius of being dominated by women and wives, and of being a womanizer. Claudius married four times, after two failed betrothals. The first betrothal was to his distant cousin Aemilia Lepida, but was broken for political reasons. The second was to Livia Medullina Camilla, which ended with Medullina's sudden death on their wedding day.

=== Plautia Urgulanilla ===
Plautia Urgulanilla was the granddaughter of Livia's confidant Urgulania. During their marriage she gave birth to a son, Claudius Drusus. Drusus died of asphyxiation in his early teens, shortly after becoming engaged to Junilla, daughter of Sejanus. Claudius later divorced Urgulanilla for adultery and on suspicion of murdering her sister-in-law Apronia. When Urgulanilla gave birth after the divorce, Claudius repudiated the baby girl, Claudia, as the father was allegedly one of his own freedmen. Later, this action made him the target of criticism by his enemies.

=== Aelia Paetina ===
Soon after (possibly in AD 28), Claudius married Aelia Paetina, a relative of Sejanus, if not Sejanus's adoptive sister. During their marriage, Claudius and Paetina had a daughter, Claudia Antonia. He later divorced her after the marriage became a political liability. One version suggests that it was due to emotional and mental abuse by Paetina.

=== Valeria Messalina ===
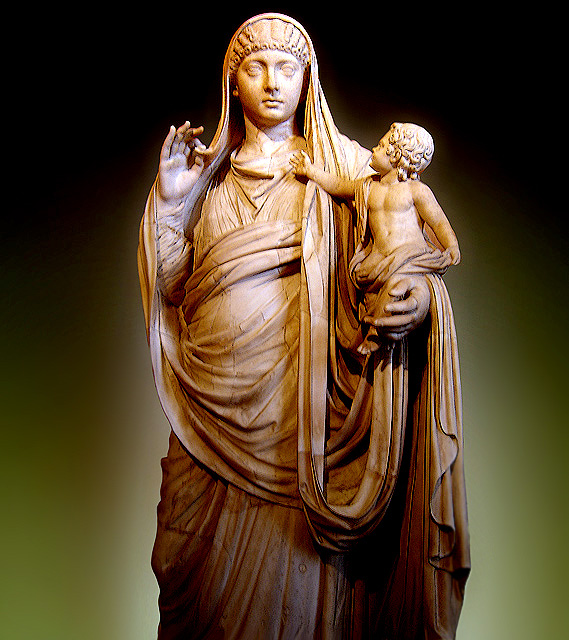
Messalina holding her son Britannicus, Louvre, Paris

Some years after divorcing Aelia Paetina, in AD 38 or early 39, Claudius married Valeria Messalina, who was his first cousin once removed (Claudius's grandmother, Octavia the Younger, was Valeria's great-grandmother on both her mother and father's side) and closely allied with Caligula's circle. Shortly thereafter, she gave birth to a daughter, Claudia Octavia. A son, first named Tiberius Claudius Germanicus, and later known as Britannicus, was born just after Claudius's accession.

This marriage ended in tragedy. The ancient historians allege that Messalina was a nymphomaniac who was regularly unfaithful to Claudius—Tacitus states she went so far as to compete with a prostitute to see who could have more sexual partners in a night – and manipulated his policies to amass wealth. In 48, Messalina married her lover Gaius Silius in a public ceremony while Claudius was at Ostia.

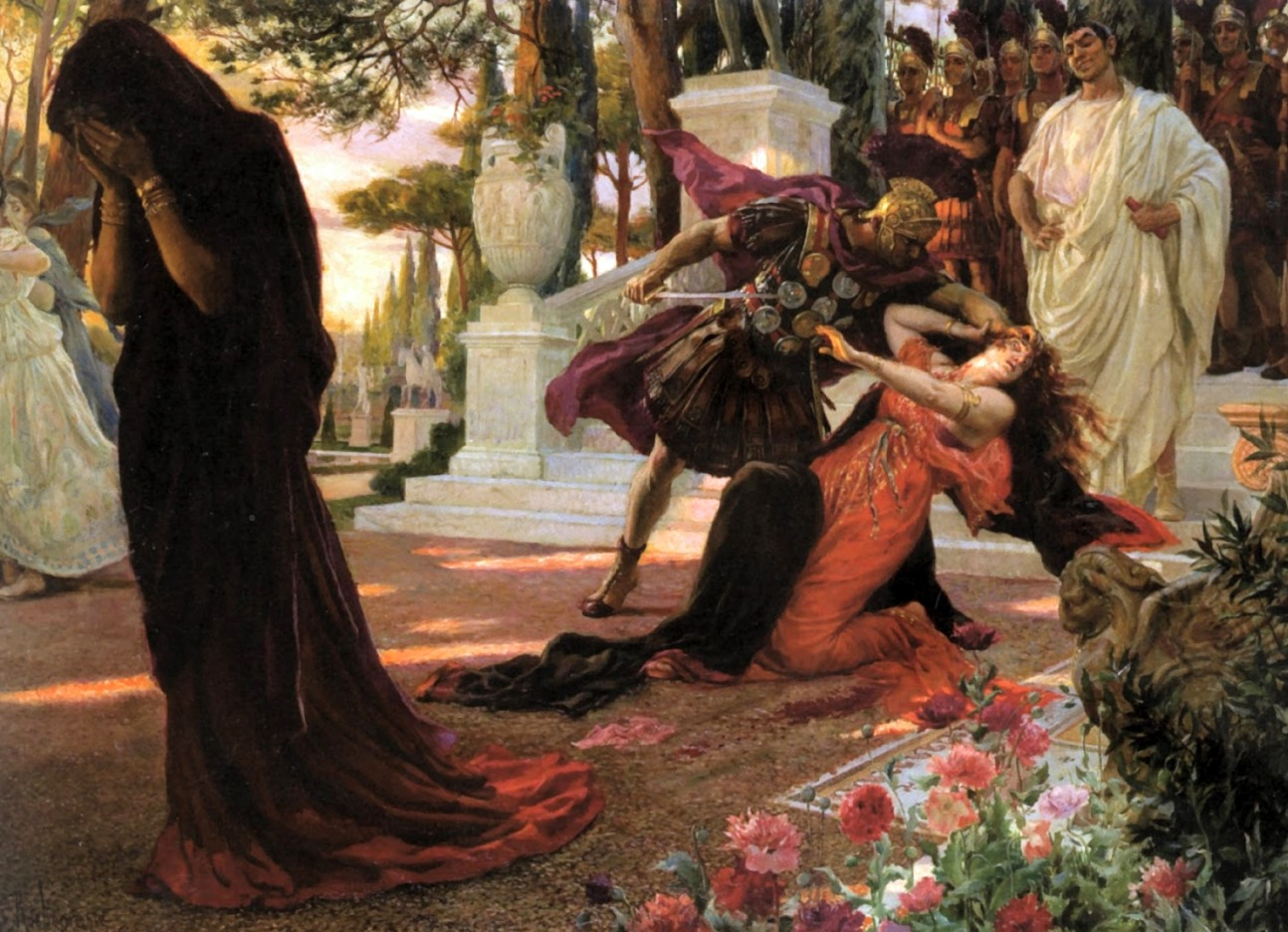
The Death of Messalina by Georges-Antoine Rochegrosse, 1916

Sources disagree as to whether or not she divorced the Emperor first, and whether the intention was to usurp the throne. Under Roman law, the spouse needed to be informed that he or she had been divorced before a new marriage could take place; the sources state that Claudius was in total ignorance until after the marriage. Scramuzza, in his biography, suggests that Silius may have convinced Messalina that Claudius was doomed, and the union was her only hope of retaining her rank and protecting her children. The historian Tacitus suggests that Claudius's ongoing term as Censor may have prevented him from noticing the affair before it reached such a critical point, after which she was executed.

=== Agrippina the Younger ===
Claudius married once more. Ancient sources tell that his freedmen put forward three candidates, Caligula's third wife Lollia Paulina, Claudius's divorced second wife Aelia Paetina and Claudius's niece Agrippina the Younger. According to Suetonius, Agrippina won out through her feminine wiles. She gradually seized power from Claudius and successfully conspired to eliminate his son's rivals, opening the way for her son to become emperor.

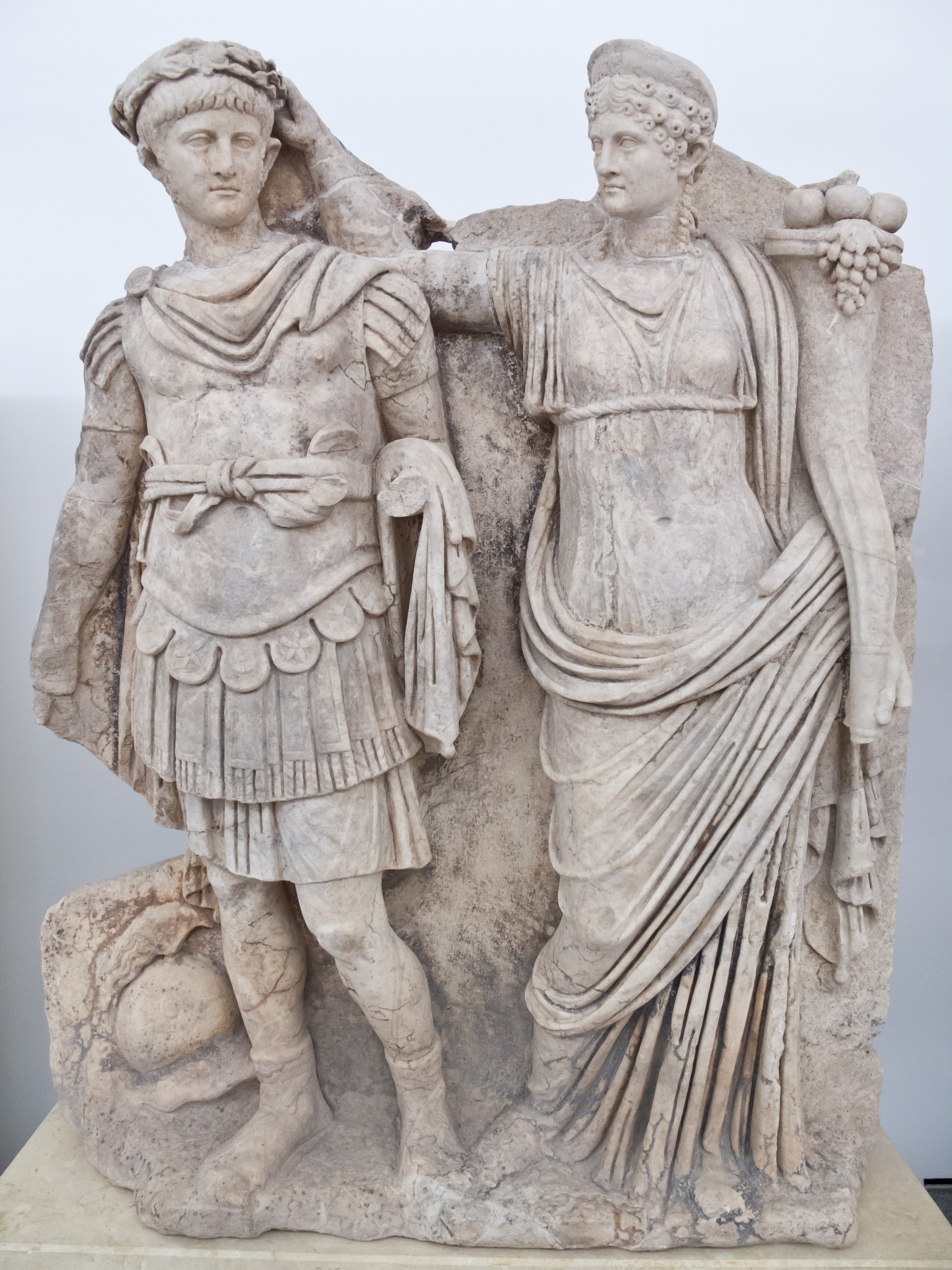
Sculpture of Agrippina crowning her young son Nero (c. AD 54–59)

The truth is probably more political. The attempted coup d'état by Silius and Messalina probably made Claudius realize the weakness of his position as a member of the Claudian (but not the Julian) family. This weakness was compounded by the fact that he did not yet have an obvious adult heir, Britannicus being just a boy. Agrippina was one of the few remaining descendants of Augustus, and her son Lucius Domitius Ahenobarbus (the future Nero) was one of the last males of the Imperial family. Coup attempts might rally around the pair and Agrippina was already showing such ambition. It has been suggested that the Senate pushed for the marriage, an attempt to end the feud between the Julian and Claudian branches. This feud dated back to Agrippina's mother's actions against Tiberius after the death of her husband Germanicus (Claudius's brother), actions that Tiberius had punished.

Another reason was to bring in Lucius Domitius Ahenobarbus as a candidate for the succession. His prestige as the descendent of Augustus and Germanicus made him popular, and marking him as an heir would have helped the survival of Claudius's regime. In any case, Claudius accepted Agrippina and later adopted the mature Ahenobarbus as his son, renaming him as "Nero Claudius Caesar". Nero was married to Claudius's daughter Octavia, made joint heir with the underage Britannicus, and promoted; Augustus had similarly named his grandson Postumus Agrippa and his stepson Tiberius as joint heirs, and Tiberius had named Caligula as his joint heir with his grandson Tiberius Gemellus. Adoption of adults or near adults was an old tradition in Rome when a suitable natural adult heir was unavailable, as was the case during Britannicus's minority. Claudius may have previously looked to adopt one of his sons-in-law to protect his own reign.

Faustus Cornelius Sulla Felix, who was married to Claudius's daughter Claudia Antonia, was only descended from Octavia and Antony on one side – not close enough to the Imperial family to ensure his right to be Emperor (although that did not stop others from making him the object of a coup attempt against Nero a few years later), besides being the half-brother of Valeria Messalina, which told against him. Nero was more popular with the general public as both the grandson of Germanicus and the direct descendant of Augustus.

== Disability and personality ==
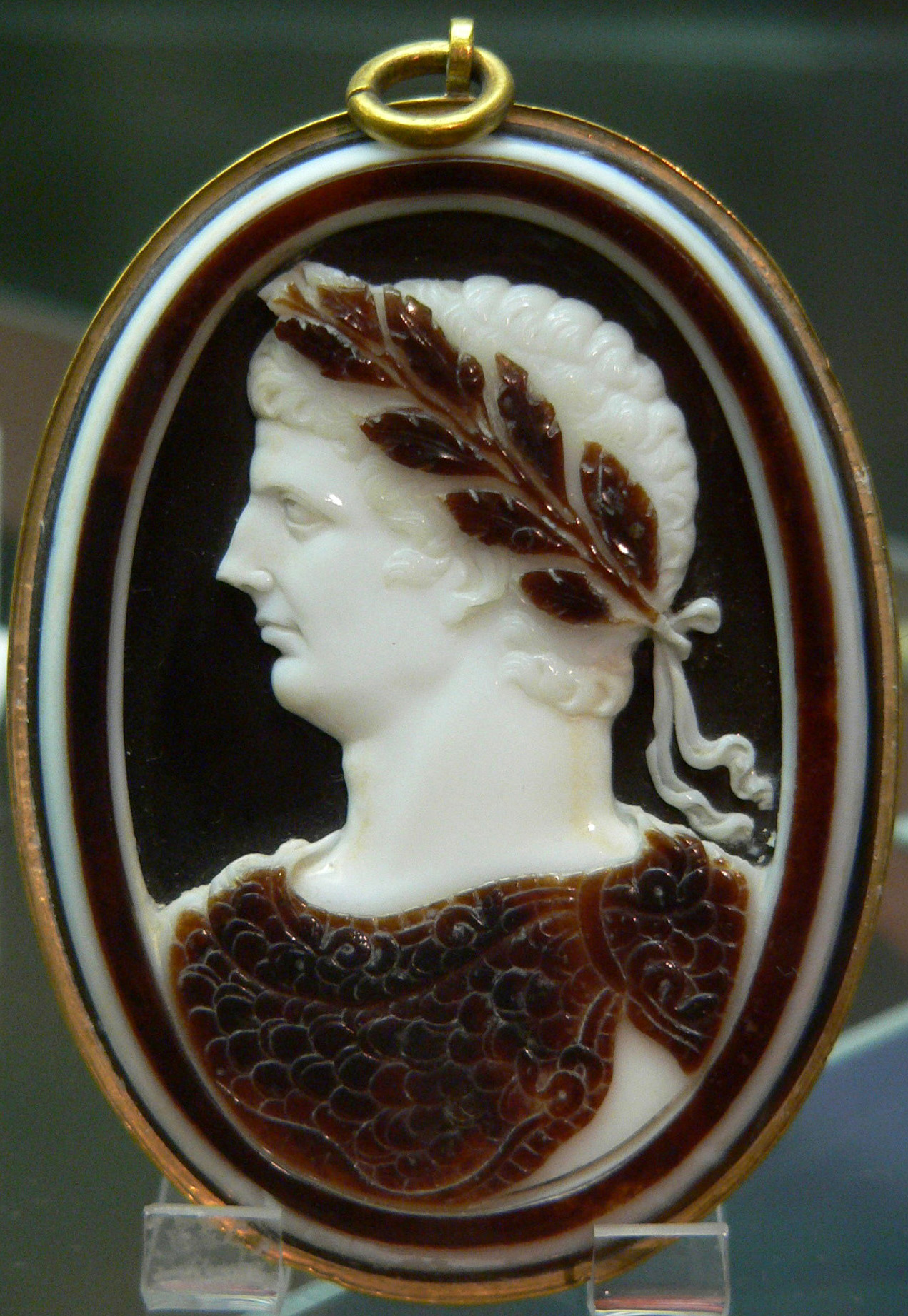
Cameo of Claudius

The historian Suetonius describes the physical manifestations of Claudius's condition. His knees were weak and gave way under him and his head shook. He stammered and his speech was confused. He slobbered and his nose ran when he was excited. The Stoic Seneca states in his Apocolocyntosis that Claudius's voice belonged to no land animal, and that his hands were weak as well.

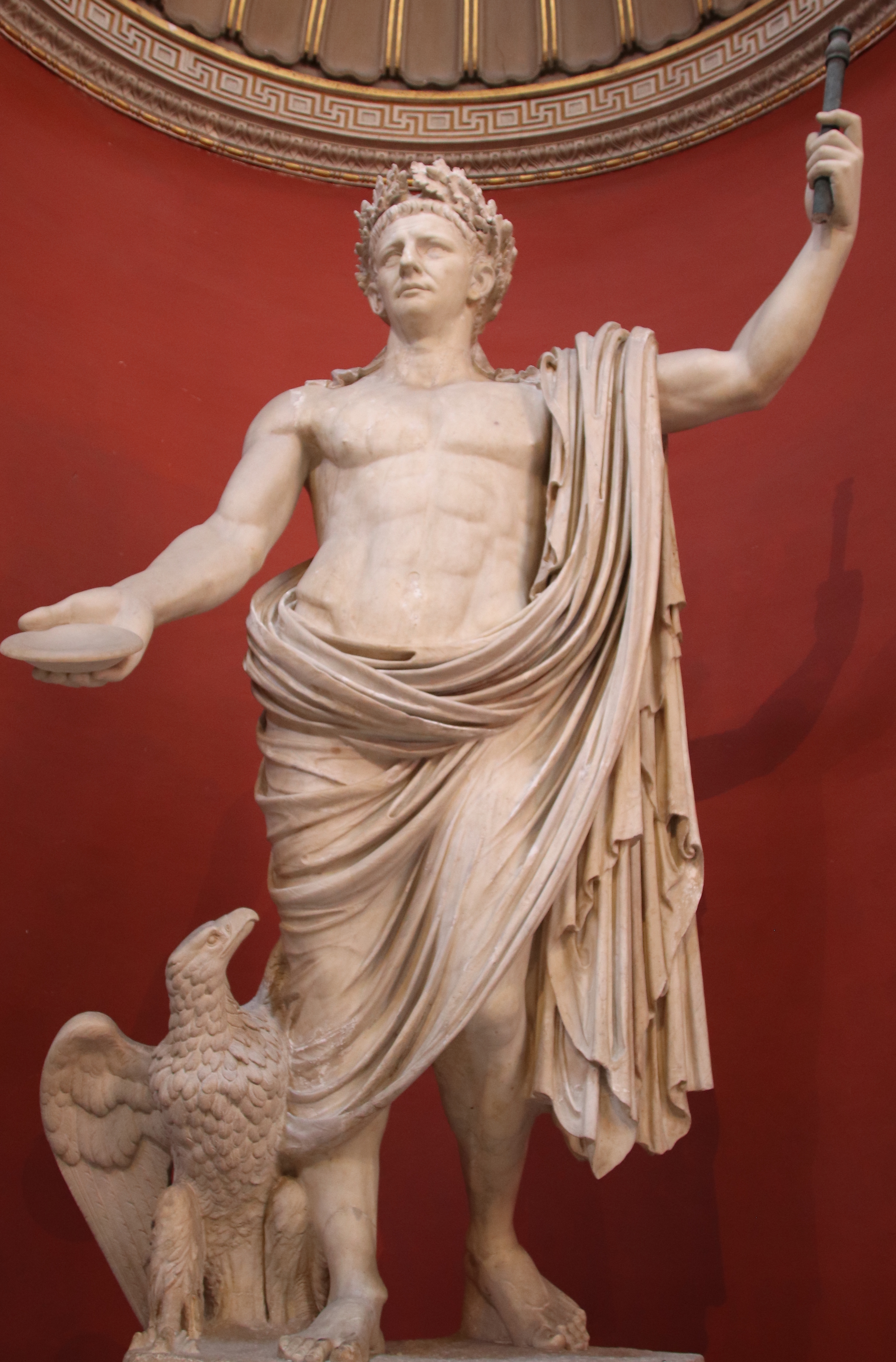
Claudius depicted as the Roman god Jupiter. Vatican Museums

However, he showed no physical deformity, as Suetonius notes that when calm and seated he was a tall, well-built figure of dignitas. When angered or stressed, his symptoms became worse. Historians agree that this condition improved upon his accession to the throne. Claudius himself claimed that he had exaggerated his ailments to save his life.

Modern assessments of his health have changed several times in the past century. Prior to World War II, infantile paralysis (or polio) was widely accepted as the cause. This is the diagnosis used in Robert Graves's Claudius novels, first published in the 1930s. The New York Times wrote in 1934 that Claudius suffered from infantile paralysis (which led to his limp state) and measles (which made him deaf) at seven months of age, among several other ailments. Polio does not explain many of the described symptoms, however, and a more recent theory implicates cerebral palsy as the cause. Tourette syndrome has also been considered a possibility.

As a person, ancient historians described Claudius as generous and lowbrow, a man who sometimes lunched with the plebeians. They also paint him as bloodthirsty and cruel, over-fond of gladiatorial combat and executions, and very quick to anger; Claudius himself acknowledged the latter trait, and apologized publicly for his temper. According to the ancient historians he was also excessively trusting, and easily manipulated by his wives and freedmen, but at the same time they portray him as paranoid and apathetic, dull and easily confused.

== Scholarly works and their impact ==
Claudius wrote copiously throughout his life. Arnaldo Momigliano states that during the reign of Tiberius, which covers the peak of Claudius's literary career, it became impolitic to speak of republican Rome. The trend among the young historians was either to write about the new empire or about obscure antiquarian topics. Claudius was the rare scholar who covered both.

Besides his history of Augustus's reign that caused him so much grief, his major works included Tyrrhenika, a twenty-book Etruscan history, and Carchedonica, an eight-volume history of Carthage, as well as an Etruscan dictionary. He also wrote a book on dice-playing. Despite the general avoidance of the topic of the Republican era, he penned a defense of Cicero against the charges of Asinius Gallus. Modern historians have used this to determine the nature of his politics and of the aborted chapters of his civil war history.

The Claudian letters

He proposed a reform of the Latin alphabet by the addition of three new letters; he officially instituted the change during his censorship but they did not survive his reign. Claudius also tried to revive the old custom of putting dots between successive words (Classical Latin was written with no spacing). Finally, he wrote an eight-volume autobiography that Suetonius describes as lacking in taste. Claudius (like most of the members of his dynasty) harshly criticized his predecessors and relatives in surviving speeches.

None of the works survived, but other sources' reference to him provide material for the surviving histories of the Julio-Claudian dynasty. Suetonius quotes Claudius's autobiography once and must have used it as a source numerous times. Tacitus uses Claudius's arguments for the orthographical innovations mentioned above and may have used him for some of the more antiquarian passages in his annals. Claudius is the source for numerous passages of Pliny's Natural History.

The influence of historical study on Claudius is obvious. In his speech on Gallic senators, he uses a version of the founding of Rome identical to that of Livy, his tutor in adolescence. Many of the public works instituted in his reign were based on plans first suggested by Julius Caesar. Levick believes this emulation of Caesar may have spread to all aspects of his policies.

His censorship seems to have been based on those of his ancestors, particularly Appius Claudius Caecus, and he used the office to put into place many policies based on those of Republican times. This is when many of his religious reforms took effect; also, his building efforts greatly increased during his tenure. In fact, his assumption of the office of Censor may have been motivated by a desire to see his academic labors bear fruit. For example, he believed (as most Romans did) that Caecus had used the power of the censorship office to introduce the letter "R" and so used his own term to introduce his new letters.

== Death ==
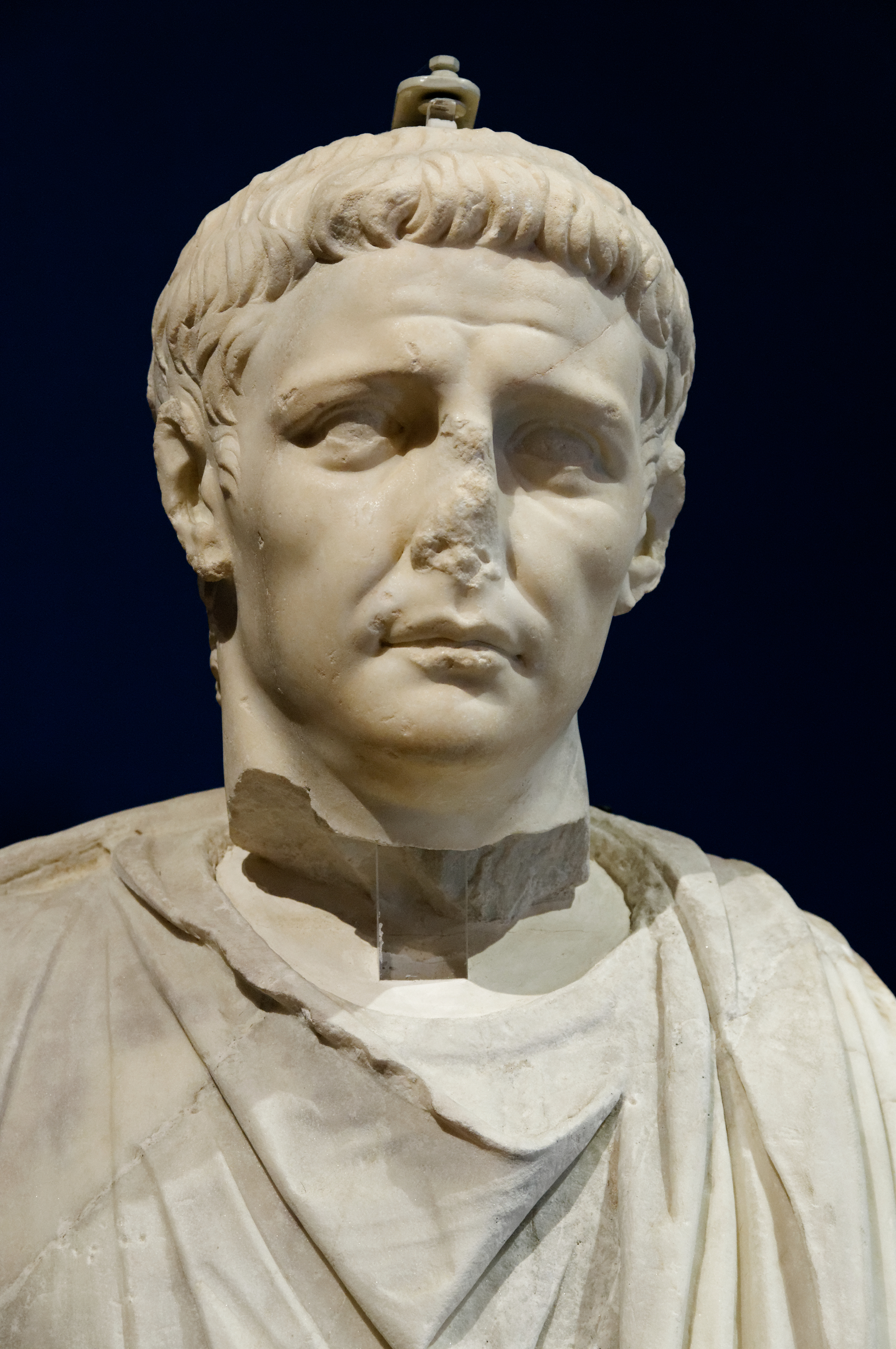
A statue of Claudius at the Domvs Romana, Malta

Ancient historians agree that Claudius was murdered by poison – possibly contained in mushrooms or on a feather (ostensibly put down his throat to induce vomiting) – and died in the early hours of 13 October AD 54. Nearly all implicate his final and powerful wife, Agrippina, as the instigator. Agrippina and Claudius had become more combative in the months leading up to his death. This carried on to the point where Claudius openly lamented his bad wives, and began to comment on Britannicus's approaching manhood with an eye towards restoring his status within the imperial family. Agrippina had motive in ensuring the succession of Nero before Britannicus could gain power.

Some implicate either his taster Halotus, his doctor Xenophon, or the infamous poisoner Locusta as the administrator of the fatal substance. Some say he died after prolonged suffering following a single dose at dinner, and some have him recovering only to be poisoned again. Among his contemporary sources, Seneca the Younger ascribed the emperor's death to natural causes, while Josephus only spoke of rumors of his poisoning.

Some historians have cast doubt on whether Claudius was murdered or merely died from illness or old age. (Note: Scramuzza 1940, pp. 92–93 says that tradition makes every emperor the victim of foul play, so we can't know if Claudius was truly murdered. The Emperor appears to have been seriously ill since at least 53. Levick 2015, pp. 76–77 raises the possibility that Claudius was killed by the stress of fighting with Agrippina over the succession, but concludes that the timing makes murder the most likely cause.) Evidence against his murder include his serious illnesses in his last years, his unhealthy lifestyle and the fact that his taster Halotus continued to serve in the same position under Nero. Claudius had been so ill the year before that Nero vowed games for his recovery and the year of 54 seems to have been such an unhealthy year that one sitting member of each magistracy died within the span of a few months. He may even have died by eating a naturally poisonous mushroom, possibly Amanita muscaria. On the other hand, some modern scholars claim the near universality of the accusations in ancient texts lends credence to the crime. Claudius's ashes were interred in the Mausoleum of Augustus on 24 October AD 54, after a funeral similar to that of his great-uncle Augustus 40 years earlier.

== Legacy ==
=== Divine honours ===
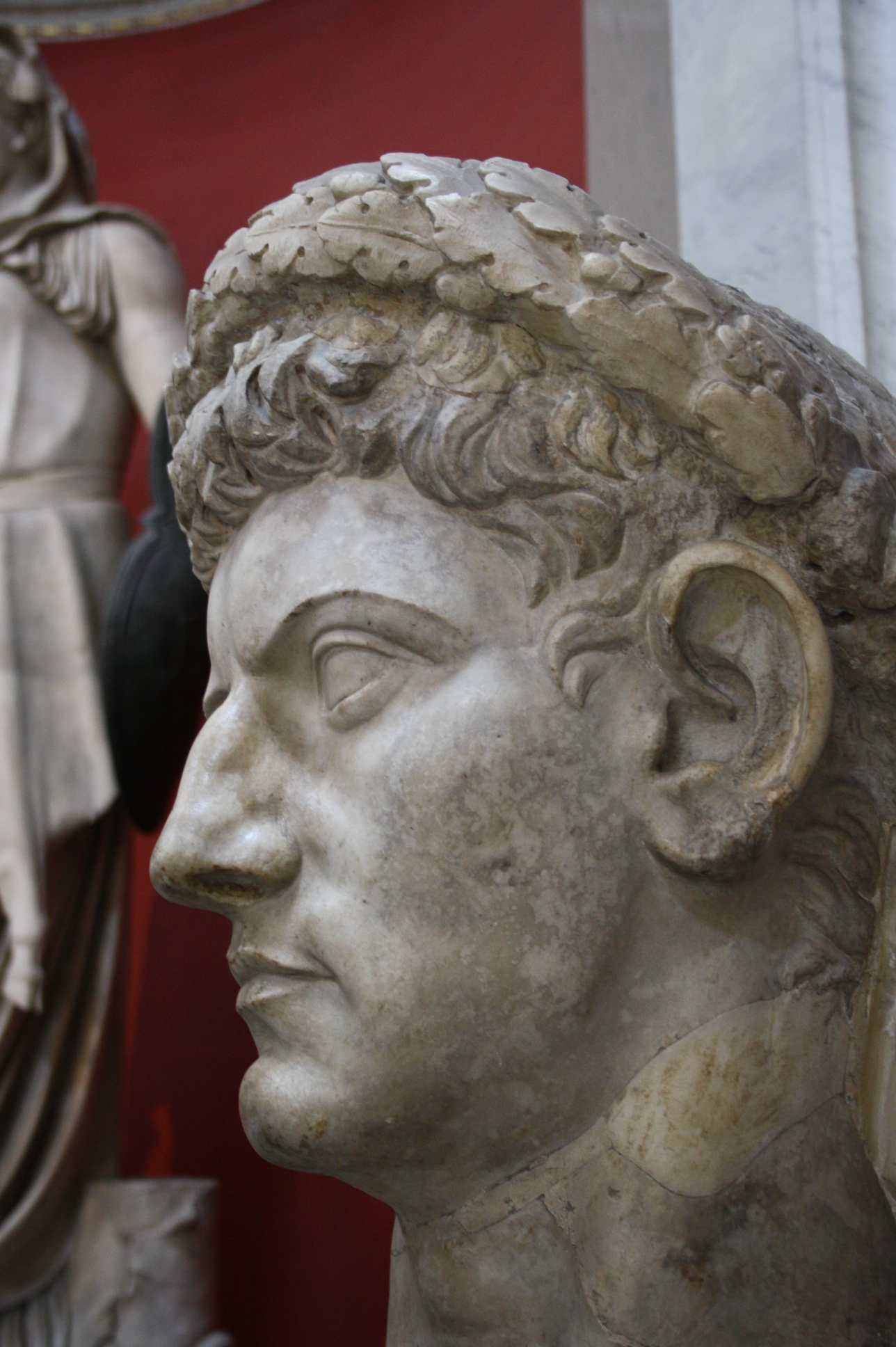
Bust of Claudius, circa 50 AD, Museo Pio-Clementino

Already, while alive, he received the widespread private worship of a living princeps and was worshipped in Britannia in his own temple in Camulodunum. Claudius was deified by Nero and the Senate almost immediately.

=== Views of the new regime ===
Agrippina had sent Narcissus away shortly before Claudius's death, and now had the freedman murdered. The last act of this secretary of letters was to burn all of Claudius's correspondence – most likely so it could not be used against him and others in an already hostile new regime. Thus Claudius's private words about his own policies and motives were lost to history. Just as Claudius had criticized his predecessors in official edicts, Nero often criticized the deceased Emperor, and many Claudian laws and edicts were disregarded under the reasoning that he was too stupid and senile to have meant them.

Seneca's Apocolocyntosis mocks the deification of Claudius and reinforces the view of Claudius as an unpleasant fool; this remained the official view for the duration of Nero's reign. Eventually Nero stopped referring to his deified adoptive father at all. Claudius's temple was left unfinished after only some of the foundation had been laid down. Eventually the site was overtaken by Nero's Golden House.

=== Flavian and later perspectives ===
The Flavians, who had risen to prominence under Claudius, took a different tack. They needed to shore up their legitimacy, but also justify the fall of the Julio-Claudians. They reached back to Claudius in contrast with Nero, to show that they were associated with a good regime. Commemorative coins were issued of Claudius and his son Britannicus, who had been a friend of Emperor Titus (Titus was born in AD 39, Britannicus was born in 41). When Nero's Golden House was burned, the Temple of Claudius was finally completed on the Caelian Hill.

However, as the Flavians became established, they needed to emphasize their own credentials more, and their references to Claudius ceased. Instead, he was lumped with the other emperors of the fallen dynasty. His state-cult in Rome probably continued until the abolition of all cults of dead Emperors by Maximinus Thrax in AD 237–238. The Feriale Duranum, probably identical to the festival calendars of every regular army unit, assigns him a sacrifice of a steer on his birthday, the Kalends of August. And such commemoration (and consequent feasting) probably continued until the Christianization and disintegration of the army in the late 4th century.

=== Views of ancient historians ===
The ancient historians Tacitus, Suetonius (in The Twelve Caesars), and Cassius Dio all wrote after the last of the Flavians had gone. All three were senators or equites. They took the side of the Senate in most conflicts with the Princeps, invariably viewing him as being in the wrong. This resulted in biases, both conscious and unconscious. Suetonius lost access to the official archives shortly after beginning his work. He was forced to rely on second-hand accounts when it came to Claudius (with the exception of Augustus's letters, which had been gathered earlier). Suetonius painted Claudius as a ridiculous figure, belittling many of his acts and crediting his good works to his retinue.

Tacitus wrote a narrative for his fellow senators and fitted each of the emperors into a simple mold of his choosing. He wrote of Claudius as a passive pawn and an idiot in affairs relating to the palace and public life. During his censorship of AD 47–48, Tacitus allows the reader a glimpse of a Claudius who is more statesmanlike (XI.23–25), but it is a mere glimpse. Tacitus is usually held to have 'hidden' his use of Claudius's writings and to have omitted Claudius's character from his works. (Note: Annales XI 14 is often thought to be a good example: the digression on the history of writing is actually Claudius's own argument for his new letters, and fits in with his personality and extant writings. Tacitus makes no explicit attribution – and so there exists the possibility that the digression is Tacitus's own work or derivative of another source.) Even his version of Claudius's Lyon tablet speech is edited to be devoid of the emperor's personality. Dio was less biased, but seems to have used Suetonius and Tacitus as sources. Thus, the conception of Claudius as a weak fool, controlled by those he supposedly ruled, was preserved for the ages. As time passed, Claudius was mostly forgotten outside of the historians' accounts. His books were lost first, as their antiquarian subjects became unfashionable. In the 2nd century, Pertinax, who shared his birthday, became emperor, overshadowing commemoration of Claudius.

== In modern media ==
- The best known fictional representation of the Emperor Claudius was contained in the books I, Claudius and Claudius the God (published in 1934 and 1935, respectively) by Robert Graves, both written in the first-person to give the reader the impression that they are Claudius's autobiography. Graves employed a fictive artifice to suggest that they were recently discovered, genuine translations of Claudius's writings. Claudius's extant letters, speeches, and sayings were incorporated into the text (mostly in the second book, Claudius the God), to add authenticity.
  - In 1937, director Josef von Sternberg attempted a film version of I, Claudius, with Charles Laughton as Claudius. However, the lead actress, Merle Oberon, had a near-fatal car accident and the movie was never finished. The surviving reels were featured in the BBC documentary The Epic That Never Was (1965). The motion picture rights for a new film eventually passed to producer Scott Rudin (b. 1958).
  - Graves's two books were the basis for a British television adaptation I, Claudius, produced by the BBC. The series starred Derek Jacobi as Claudius and was broadcast in 1976 on BBC2. It was a substantial critical success, and won several BAFTA awards. The series was later broadcast in the United States on Masterpiece Theatre in 1977. The 1996 7-VHS release and the later DVD release of the television series, include The Epic That Never Was documentary.
  - A radio adaptation of the Graves novels by Robin Brooks and directed by Jonquil Panting, was broadcast in six one-hour episodes on BBC Radio 4 beginning 4 December 2010. The cast featured Tom Goodman-Hill as Claudius, Derek Jacobi as Augustus, Harriet Walter as Livia, Tim McInnerny as Tiberius and Samuel Barnett as Caligula.
- The 1954 film Demetrius and the Gladiators also portrayed him sympathetically, played by Barry Jones.
- In the 1960 film Messalina, Claudius is portrayed by Mino Doro.
- On television, Freddie Jones portrayed Claudius in the 1968 British television series The Caesars.
- The 1975 TV Special Further Up Pompeii! (based on the Frankie Howerd sit-com Up Pompeii!) featured Cyril Appleton as Claudius.
- In the 1979 motion picture Caligula, where the role was performed by Giancarlo Badessi, Claudius is depicted as an idiot, in contrast to Robert Graves's portrait of Claudius as a cunning and deeply intelligent man, who is perceived by others to be an idiot.
- In the 1981 Franco-Italian film Caligula and Messalina, he was portrayed by Gino Turini (as John Turner).
- The 1985 made-for-television miniseries A.D. features actor Richard Kiley as Claudius. Kiley portrays him as thoughtful, but willing to cater to public opinion as well as being under the influence of Agrippina.
- There is also a reference to Claudius's suppression of a coup in the movie Gladiator, though that incident is entirely fictional.
- In the 2004 TV film Imperium: Nero, Claudius is portrayed by Massimo Dapporto.
- In the series Britannia (2018), Claudius visits Britannia, played by Steve Pemberton as a fool who is drugged by Aulus Plautius.
- He is portrayed in Season 3 of the Netflix documentary series Roman Empire, which focused on the reign of Caligula, by Kelson Henderson. The series concludes with Claudius's accession.
- He is portrayed by Derek Jacobi in the 2019 BBC film Horrible Histories: The Movie - Rotten Romans.

In literature, Claudius and his contemporaries appear in the historical novel The Roman by Mika Waltari. Canadian-born science fiction writer A. E. van Vogt reimagined Robert Graves's Claudius story, in his two novels, Empire of the Atom and The Wizard of Linn. The historical novel Chariot of the Soul by Linda Proud features Claudius as host and mentor of the young Togidubnus, son of King Verica of the Atrebates, during his ten-year stay in Rome. When Togidubnus returns to Britain in advance of the Roman army, it is with a mission given to him by Claudius.

== See also ==
- Julio-Claudian family tree
- List of Roman emperors
- Temple of Claudius

== Bibliography ==
=== Ancient sources ===
- Lucius Annaeus Seneca the Younger (1902) [1st century]. Apocolocyntosis divi Claudii. Translated by Allan Perley Ball. Columbia University Press.
- Gaius Plinius Secundus (1961) [c. 77 AD]. Natural History. Translated by H. Rackham; W.H.S. Jones; D.E. Eichholz. Harvard University Press.
- Josephus (1737) [c. 96 AD]. "Chapters XIX–XX". Antiquities of the Jews. Translated by William Whiston. Harvard University Press.
- Publius Cornelius Tacitus (1924) [c. AD 110]. "Books 11–11". The Annals. Translated by Frederick W. Shipley. Loeb Classical Library.
- Gaius Suetonius Tranquillus (1914) [c. AD 121]. "Life of Claudius". The Twelve Caesars. Translated by John Carew Rolfe. Loeb Classical Library.
- Lucius Cassius Dio (1927) [c. 230]. "Books 60–61". Roman History. Translated by Earnest Cary. Loeb Classical Library.

=== Modern sources ===
- Aveline, John (2004). "The Death of Claudius". Historia: Zeitschrift für Alte Geschichte. 53 (4): 453–475. ISSN 0018-2311. JSTOR 4436743.
- Griffin, Miriam (1990). "Claudius in Tacitus". The Classical Quarterly. 40 (2): 482–501. doi:10.1017/S0009838800043056. ISSN 0009-8388. JSTOR 639107. S2CID 170810972.
- Humphrey, John H. (1986). Roman Circuses: Arenas for Chariot Racing. University of California Press. ISBN 978-0-520-04921-5.
- Hurley, Donna W., ed. (2001). Suetonius: Diuus Claudius. Cambridge University Press. ISBN 0-521-59325-5.
- Levick, B. M. (1978). "Antiquarian or Revolutionary? Claudius Caesar's Conception of His Principate". The American Journal of Philology. 99 (1): 79–105. doi:10.2307/293870. ISSN 0002-9475. JSTOR 293870.
- Levick, Barbara (2015) [1990]. Claudius (2nd ed.). London: Routledge. ISBN 978-0-415-70357-4.
- Leon, Ernestine F. (1948). "The Imbecillitas of the Emperor Claudius". Transactions and Proceedings of the American Philological Association. 79: 79–86. doi:10.2307/283354. ISSN 0065-9711. JSTOR 283354.
- Major, Ann (1992). "Was He Pushed or Did He Leap? Claudius' Ascent to Power". Ancient History. 22: 25–31.
- Momigliano, Arnaldo (1934). Claudius, the Emperor and His Achievement. Translated by W.D. Hogarth. W. Heffer and Sons.
- Oost, Stewart Irvin (1958). "The Career of M. Antonius Pallas". The American Journal of Philology. 79 (2): 113–139. doi:10.2307/292103. ISSN 0002-9475. JSTOR 292103.
- Ruth, Thomas De Coursey (1916). The problem of Claudius: Some aspects of a character study. Johns Hopkins University.
- Ryan, F. X. (1993). "Some Observations on the Censorship of Claudius and Vitellius, A.D. 47-48". The American Journal of Philology. 114 (4): 611–618. doi:10.2307/295428. ISSN 0002-9475. JSTOR 295428.
- Scramuzza, Vincent (1940). The Emperor Claudius. Harvard University Press. ISBN 9780598740687.
- Simpson, C.J. (1981). "The Early Name of the Emperor Claudius" (PDF). Acta Antiqua Academiae Scientiarum Hungaricae. 29: 363–368.
- Stuart, Meriwether (1936). "The Date of the Inscription of Claudius on the Arch of Ticinum". American Journal of Archaeology. 40 (3): 314–322. doi:10.2307/498692. JSTOR 498692. S2CID 191396418.
- Suhr, Elmer G. (1955). "A Portrait of Claudius". American Journal of Archaeology. 59 (4): 319–322. doi:10.2307/500799. JSTOR 500799. S2CID 192971087.
- Vessey, D. W. T. C. (1971). "Thoughts on Tacitus' Portrayal of Claudius". The American Journal of Philology. 92 (3): 385–409. doi:10.2307/292801. ISSN 0002-9475. JSTOR 292801.

Claudius Julio-Claudian dynasty Born: 1 August 10 BC Died: 13 October AD 54
Roman emperors
Preceded by Caligula	Roman emperor 41–54	Succeeded by Nero
Political offices
Preceded by Gn. Acerronius Proculus; G. Petronius Pontius Nigrinus	Roman consul 37 (suffect) with Caligula	Succeeded by A. Caecina Paetus; G. Caninius Rebilus
Preceded by Caligula; Gn. Sentius Saturninus	Roman consul II; 42–43 with G. Caecina Largus (42); L. Vitellius II (43)	Succeeded by T. Statilius Taurus; G. Sallustius Passienus Crispus
Preceded by M. Junius Silanus; G. Terentius Tullius Geminus	Roman consul III; 47 with L. Vitellius III	Succeeded by A. Vitellius; L. Vipstanus Poplicola Messalla
Preceded by Camerinus Antistius Vetus; M. Suillius Nerullinus	Roman consul IV; 51 with Ser. Cornelius Scipio Salvidienus Orfitus	Succeeded by Faustus Cornelius Sulla Felix; L. Salvius Otho Titianus
