= Fabia Numantina =

Ancient Roman Noblewoman

Fabia Numantina was a member of the patrician Fabia gens. Precisely how she fits into this family is not certain; while she is generally believed to be the daughter of Paullus Fabius Maximus and Marcia, a maternal first cousin of Augustus, it is possible that she was the daughter of Paullus' brother, Africanus Fabius Maximus.

== Marriages ==
Fabia Numantina was married twice: first to Sextus Appuleius, a half-great-nephew of Augustus, by whom she had a son, also named Sextus Appuleius. This child died young, and Fabia described him on his tombstone as 'last of the Appuleii'.

Fabia's second husband was Marcus Plautius Silvanus, praetor in AD 24. He was the son of Marcus Plautius Silvanus, who had been consul in 2 BC, and Lartia. However, Fabia and Silvanus seem to have been divorced prior to Silvanus' praetorship, as Silvanus was then married to a woman named Apronia, whom he apparently murdered by throwing her out of a window.

Shortly after Apronia's murder, Fabia was "charged with having caused her husband's insanity by magical incantations and potions", but she was acquitted.

== Other children ==
It is uncertain if Fabia had any children apart from Sextus Appuleius. She may have been the mother of a young man named Fabius Numantinus, who was admitted to a sacerdotal college in the Neronian era.

== Bibliography ==
- Publius Cornelius Tacitus, Annales.
- Inscriptiones Latinae Selectae (ILS), Berlin (1892-1916).
- Ronald Syme, The Augustan Aristocracy, Oxford University Press (1989), ISBN 0-19-814731-7, ISBN 978-0-19-814731-2.
