= Domitia gens =

Ancient Roman family

The gens Domitia was a plebeian family at ancient Rome. The first of the gens to achieve prominence was Gnaeus Domitius Calvinus, consul in 332 BC. His son, Gnaeus Domitius Calvinus Maximus, was consul in 283, and the first plebeian censor. The family produced several distinguished generals, and towards the end of the Republic, the Domitii were looked upon as one of the most illustrious gentes.

== Praenomina ==
The praenomen most associated with the Domitii was Gnaeus. The Domitii Calvini also used Marcus, while the Ahenobarbi used Lucius.

== Branches and cognomina ==
During the time of the Republic, there are recorded only two branches of this gens, the Ahenobarbi and Calvini, and with the exception of a few unknown personages mentioned in isolated passages of Cicero, there is none without a cognomen.

Calvinus, the name of the oldest family of the Domitii, is derived from the Latin adjective calvus, meaning "bald." The lengthened form, Calvinus is a diminutive, generally translated as "baldish", although it could also refer to the descendants of someone who had borne the surname Calvus. Such names belong to a common class of cognomina derived from a person's physical features.

The family named Ahenobarbus was so called from the red hair which many of its members had. To explain this name, which signifies, "Red-Beard" (literally, "Bronze-Beard"), and to assign a high antiquity to their family, it was said that the Dioscuri announced to one of their ancestors the victory of the Romans over the Latins at Lake Regillus (498 BC), and, to confirm the truth of what they said, that they stroked his black hair and beard, which immediately became red.

== Members ==
This list includes abbreviated praenomina. For an explanation of this practice, see filiation.

=== Domitii Calvini ===
- Gnaeus Domitius Calvinus, father of the consul of 332 BC.
- Gnaeus Domitius Cn. f. Calvinus, consul in 332 BC.
- Gnaeus Domitius Cn. f. Cn. n. Calvinus, surnamed Maximus, consul in 283 BC, won a great victory over the Gauls and Etruscans; dictator in 280; after laying down his office, Calvinus became the first plebeian censor.
- Domitius (Cn. f. Cn. n.) Calvinus, as praetor, conquered the Etruscan town of Luna, which had been occupied by the Illyrians. The year is uncertain, but must have occurred after the First Punic War.
- Marcus Domitius Calvinus, grandfather of Gnaeus Domitius Calvinus, consul in 53 and 40 BC.
- Marcus Domitius M. f. Calvinus, (Note: Identified as Lucius Domitius in Plutarch and Eutropius, some sources describe him as Lucius Domitius Ahenobarbus.) praetor in 80 BC, and sent as proconsul to Hispania Citerior. In 79 he was summoned into Hispania Ulterior by Quintus Caecilius Metellus Pius, who was in want of assistance against Sertorius, but he was defeated and killed by Hirtuleius, quaestor of Sertorius, near the Anas.
- Gnaeus Domitius M. f. M. n. Calvinus, consul in 53 and 40 BC, and a partisan of both Caesar and Octavian.
- Domitia Cn. f. M. n. Calvina, married Lucius Calpurnius Bibulus and had a daughter also called Domitia Calvina.

=== Domitii Ahenobarbi ===
- Lucius Domitius Ahenobarbus, grandfather of the consul of 192 BC.
- Lucius Domitius L. f. Ahenobarbus, father of the consul of 192 BC.
- Gnaeus Domitius L. f. L. n. Ahenobarbus, plebeian aedile in 196 BC, as consul in 192 he was sent against the Boii.
- Gnaeus Domitius Cn. f. L. n. Ahenobarbus, consul suffectus in 162 BC.
- Gnaeus Domitius Cn. f. Cn. n. Ahenobarbus, consul in 122 BC. He was sent against the Allobroges, whom he conquered the following year, and over whom he received a triumph in 120. He was censor in 115.
- Domitia, the wife of Quintus Lutatius Catulus, consul in 102 BC.
- Gnaeus Domitius Cn. f. Cn. n. Ahenobarbus, consul in 96 BC, and censor in 92, with Lucius Licinius Crassus, the orator. Known for his simple tastes, severe temper, and private grudges. Crassus said of him "that it was no wonder that a man had a beard of brass, who had a mouth of iron and a heart of lead."
- Lucius Domitius Cn. f. Cn. n. Ahenobarbus, consul in 94 BC. As praetor in Sicily, after the Second Servile War, when slaves were forbidden to carry arms, he ordered a slave to be crucified for killing a wild boar with a hunting spear. During the civil war between Marius and Sulla, he espoused the side of the latter, and was murdered at Rome by the praetor Damasippus, by order of the younger Marius.
- Gnaeus Domitius Cn. f. Cn. n. Ahenobarbus, son-in-law of Cinna, and thus a partisan of Marius. Proscribed by Sulla, who came to power in 82 BC, he fled to Africa, where he collected an army, but he was defeated and killed by Gnaeus Pompeius.
- Lucius Domitius Ahenobarbus, praetor in 80 BC, is probably the same person as Marcus Domitius Calvinus, proconsul in Hispania Ulterior.
- Lucius Domitius Cn. f. Cn. n. Ahenobarbus, consul in 54 BC. Originally an opponent of the First Triumvirate, he later espoused the side of Pompeius against Caesar, against whom he prosecuted the war vigorously. He fell in battle at Pharsalus, in 48 BC.
- Gnaeus Domitius (L. f. Cn. n.) Ahenobarbus, praetor in 54 BC. He presided at the second trial of Marcus Caelius Rufus.
- Gnaeus Domitius L. f. Cn. n. Ahenobarbus, after the murder of Caesar, espoused the side of Brutus, and was condemned. He won a naval battle at Philippi, and subsequently maintained two legions and a fleet of seventy ships along the Ionian Sea. He subsequently reconciled with Marcus Antonius, and became consul in 32 BC. He went over to Octavian, but died before the Battle of Actium.
- Lucius Domitius Cn. f. L. n. Ahenobarbus, son-in-law of Marcus Antonius, the triumvir. Consul in 16 BC, succeeded Tiberius in command of the Roman army in Germania, where he crossed the Albis, and received a triumph. Suetonius describes him as haughty, prodigal, and cruel, and that Augustus was forced to restrain the bloodshed in his gladiatorial combats. He died in AD 25.
- Gnaeus Domitius L. f. Cn. n. Ahenobarbus, son-in-law of Germanicus, and father of the emperor Nero. He was consul in AD 32, and afterward proconsul in Sicily. "His life was stained with crimes of every kind... and [he] only escaped execution by the death of Tiberius."
- Domitia L. f. Cn. n. Lepida Major, aunt of the emperor Nero. She was the wife of Decimus Haterius Agrippa, who was killed by Tiberius in AD 32, and then of Gaius Sallustius Crispus Passienus, who deserted her for Julia Agrippina, the mother of Nero. At an advanced age, Domitia was poisoned by her nephew, that he might get possession of her property at Baiae and in the neighborhood of Ravenna, on which estates he built magnificent gymnasia.
- Domitia L. f. Cn. n. Lepida Minor, aunt of the emperor Nero. She was the wife of Marcus Valerius Messalla Barbatus, and mother of Messalina, wife of the emperor Claudius. Like her sister, she was a rival of Agrippina, the mother of Nero, who induced her son to have his aunt put to death in AD 55.
- Lucius Domitius Cn. f. L. n. Ahenobarbus, afterward the emperor Nero.

=== Others ===
- Marcus Domitius P. f., a senator, sent as an ambassador in Crete in 113 BC. He might have been one of the Calvini, as the Ahenobarbi did not use the praenomen Marcus.
- Domitius Marsus, a Latin poet of the Augustan age. He or one of his ancestors probably belonged to the Marsic nation, and was adopted into the noble house of the Domitii.
- Domitius Celer, an intimate friend of Gnaeus Calpurnius Piso, by whom he had been sent into Syria. After the death of Germanicus, Domitius persuaded Piso to return to that province.
- Domitius Pollio, whose daughter was selected to replace the deceased Vestal Virgin Occia.
- Gnaeus Domitius Afer, a noted orator of the first century, and consul suffectus in AD 39.
- Gnaeus Domitius Corbulo, consul in AD 39, and one of the greatest of Roman generals. Under Claudius, he obtained the command of the armies in Germania, and enjoyed much success before being recalled by a jealous emperor. Subsequently, he was sent against the Parthians, winning major victories in 54 and 58. However, the suspicious Nero ordered his death in 67.
- Domitius Balbus, a wealthy man of praetorian rank, whose will was forged in AD 61.
- Domitius Silus, the husband of Atria Galla, a woman of low birth but great physical beauty. Gaius Calpurnius Piso lured her away from Silus, whose willingness to part with his wife, along with her brazen infidelity, added to Piso's notoriety.
- Domitia Decidiana, the wife of Gnaeus Julius Agricola, and mother-in-law of the historian Tacitus.
- Domitius Caecilianus, an intimate friend of Publius Clodius Thrasea Paetus, who informed him of his condemnation by the senate in AD 67.
- Domitia, the elder daughter of Corbulo, she married the senator Lucius Annius Vinicianus, who was implicated in a plot against the emperor Nero, and took his own life rather than defend himself.
- Domitia Longina, the younger daughter of Corbulo. She married Lucius Aelius Plautius Lamia Aemilianus, but was carried off by the future emperor Domitian about AD 69. Their marriage was loveless and both spouses unfaithful. Domitia was Roman empress from 81 to 96. Aware of the conspiracy against her husband, but in fear for her own life, she encouraged the conspirators, and outlived the emperor by many years.
- Lucius Domitius Apollinaris, consul suffectus in 97, and patron of Martial.
- Domitia Paulina, wife of Publius Aelius Hadrianus Afer, and mother of the emperor Hadrian.
- Aelia Domitia Paulina, sister of the emperor Hadrian.
- Domitius Labeo, the author of a letter in the Digesta, sometimes thought to have been a jurist. He must have lived in the first part of the second century.
- Domitia Lucilla Major, grandmother of the emperor Marcus Aurelius.
- Domitius Callistratus, the author of a work on Heracleia, consisting of at least seven books.
- Gaius Domitius Dexter, consul in AD 196, during the reign of Septimius Severus, who appointed him praefectus urbi.
- Lucius Domitius Honoratus, governor of Egypt in AD 222, and later Pretorian Prefect.
- Gnaeus Domitius Annius Ulpianus, an influential jurist of the early third century.
- Domitius Florus, who had been ejected from the senate through the influence of Plautianus, was restored in the reign of Macrinus, and created tribune of the people.
- Lucius Domitius Aurelianus, emperor from AD 270 to 275.
- Lucius Domitius Domitianus, a pretender to the imperial dignity in Egypt during the reign of Diocletian.
- Lucius Domitius Alexander, proclaimed emperor by his troops during the reign of Maxentius, but swiftly defeated and put to death.
- Domitius Zenofilus, consul in 333 AD.
- Domitius Leontius, consul in 344.
- Domitius Modestus, consul in 372.

== See also ==
- List of Roman gentes

== Bibliography ==
- Polybius, Historiae (The Histories).
- Marcus Tullius Cicero, Brutus, De Divinatione, De Natura Deorum, De Oratore, Divinatio in Quintum Caecilium, Epistulae ad Familiares, Epistulae ad Quintum Fratrem, In Verrem, Philippicae, Pro Cluentio, Pro Fonteio, Pro Gaio Cornelio, Pro Rege Deiotario, Pro Scauro.
- Gaius Julius Caesar, Commentarii de Bello Civili (Commentaries on the Civil War).
- Dionysius of Halicarnassus, Romaike Archaiologia (Roman Antiquities).
- Quintus Horatius Flaccus (Horace), Epistulae.
- Titus Livius (Livy), History of Rome.
- Fasti Capitolini, AE 1940, 60.
- Valerius Maximus, Factorum ac Dictorum Memorabilium (Memorable Facts and Sayings).
- Marcus Velleius Paterculus, Compendium of Roman History.
- Strabo, Geographica.
- Quintus Asconius Pedianus, Commentarius in Oratio Ciceronis In Cornelio (Commentary on Cicero's Oration In Cornelio).
- Gaius Plinius Secundus (Pliny the Elder), Historia Naturalis (Natural History).
- Marcus Fabius Quintilianus (Quintilian), Institutio Oratoria (Institutes of Oratory).
- Sextus Julius Frontinus, Strategemata (Stratagems).
- Publius Cornelius Tacitus, Annales.
- Plutarchus, Lives of the Noble Greeks and Romans.
- Gaius Suetonius Tranquillus, De Vita Caesarum (Lives of the Caesars, or The Twelve Caesars).
- Lucius Annaeus Florus, Epitome de T. Livio Bellorum Omnium Annorum DCC (Epitome of Livy: All the Wars of Seven Hundred Years).
- Appianus Alexandrinus (Appian), Bella Celtica (The Gallic Wars), Bellum Civile (The Civil War), Bellum Samniticum (History of the Samnite War).
- Aulus Gellius, Noctes Atticae (Attic Nights).
- Lucius Cassius Dio Cocceianus (Cassius Dio), Roman History.
- Quintus Septimius Florens Tertullianus, Apologeticus.
- Aelius Lampridius, Aelius Spartianus, Flavius Vopiscus, Julius Capitolinus, Trebellius Pollio, and Vulcatius Gallicanus, Historia Augusta (Augustan History).
- Eutropius, Breviarium Historiae Romanae (Abridgement of the History of Rome).
- Paulus Orosius, Historiarum Adversum Paganos (History Against the Pagans).
- Ambrosius Theodosius Macrobius, Saturnalia.
- Stephanus of Byzantium, Ethnica.
- Joannes Zonaras, Epitome Historiarum (Epitome of History).
- Johann Caspar von Orelli, Onomasticon Tullianum, Orell Füssli, Zürich (1826–1838).
- Dictionary of Greek and Roman Biography and Mythology, William Smith, ed., Little, Brown and Company, Boston (1849).
- Wilhelm Dittenberger, Sylloge Inscriptionum Graecarum (Collection of Greek Inscriptions, abbreviated SIG), Leipzig (1883).
- George Davis Chase, "The Origin of Roman Praenomina", in Harvard Studies in Classical Philology, vol. VIII (1897).
- T. Robert S. Broughton, The Magistrates of the Roman Republic, American Philological Association (1952).
