= Aemilia Lepida =

Name of several Roman women belonging to the gens Aemilia

Aemilia Lepida is a Latin feminine given name that was given to the daughters of various Aemilius Lepiduses (Aemilii Lepidi), men belonging to the Lepidus branch of the Aemilia gens (family) that was founded by the Marcus Aemilius Lepidus who served as consul in 285 BC. The Aemila Lepidas (Aemiliae Lepidae) who appear in Roman historians were principally known for their engagements and marriages, with those in the late Republic and early Empire related to the Julio-Claudian dynasty.

== Aemilia Lepida (1st century BC), wife of Metellus Scipio ==
This Aemilia was daughter of Mamercus Aemilius Lepidus Livianus, wife of Metellus Scipio and former fiancée of Cato. Her daughter was Cornelia Metella, last wife and widow of Pompey the Great. Although Aemilia Lepida was engaged to be married to Cato the Younger, she in fact married someone else, leaving Cato to marry Atilia. In the words of Plutarch:

When [Cato] thought that he was old enough to marry — and up to that time he had consorted with no woman — he engaged himself to Lepida, who had formerly been betrothed to Metellus Scipio, but was now free, since Scipio had rejected her and the betrothal had been broken. However, before the marriage Scipio changed his mind again, and by dint of every effort got the maid. Cato was greatly exasperated and inflamed by this, and attempted to go to law about it; but his friends prevented this, and so, in his rage and youthful fervour, he betook himself to iambic verse, and heaped much scornful abuse upon Scipio, adopting the bitter tone of Archilochus, but avoiding his license and puerility. Lepida and Cato were first cousins with Lepida's father and Cato's mother being blood siblings.

== Aemilia Lepida, wife of Domitius Ahenobarbus ==
Aemilia Lepida may have been the name of the wife of Gnaeus Domitius Ahenobarbus (consul 32 BC), due to the name of Ahenobarbus's granddaughters, Domitia Lepida the Elder and Domitia Lepida the Younger. Her only child was her son Lucius Domitius Ahenobarbus (consul 16 BC). Her son married Antonia Major, a niece of Roman Emperor Augustus and a daughter to Augustus' sister Octavia Minor and Mark Antony. Their children were Domitia Lepida the Elder, Gnaeus Domitius Ahenobarbus (consul 32) and Domitia Lepida the Younger. Aemilia died before 31 BC.

== Aemilia Lepida, wife of Servilius ==
A relative of Claudia Marcella Minor is attested to have been a wife of a Servilius. She may have been the daughter of Lepidus the triumvir.

== Aemilia Lepida (exiled 20), niece Lepidus the Younger ==
Aemilia Lepida was the niece of Lepidus the Younger and sister to Manius Aemilius Lepidus. She married the wealthy senator Publius Sulpicius Quirinius. In her younger years, she was engaged to Emperor Augustus’ heir Lucius Caesar. She had borne a daughter to senator Mamercus Aemilius Scaurus.

In 20, she was charged with adultery, poisoning, consulting astrologers, falsely to claim to bear a son to her ex-husband and attempting to poison her ex-husband. At her trial her brother defended her. During her trial, the Games were held. Other distinguished ladies, accompanied her into the theatre and protested her innocence to Emperor Tiberius. She was found guilty and was exiled.

== Aemilia Lepida (1st century), wife of Galba ==
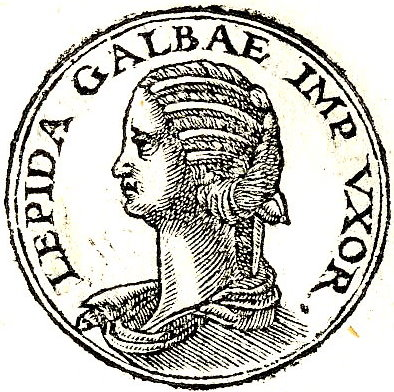
Aemilia Lepida from the Promptuarii Iconum Insigniorum

Aemilia Lepida was daughter of Manius Aemilius Lepidus, consul in AD 11. This Aemilia Lepida is usually identified with Lepida, wife of the short-lived Roman Emperor Galba. The couple had two sons before her death. She died relatively young, and their sons also died young. Galba never remarried.

When Lepida lived, Agrippina the Younger (a widow after Gnaeus Domitius Ahenobarbus' death) tried to make shameless advances to Galba, who was devoted to his wife and thus completely uninterested. On one occasion Lepida's mother gave Agrippina the Younger, while in the company of a whole bevy of married women, a public reprimand and slapped her in the face.

== Aemilia Lepida, fiancee of Claudius ==
Aemilia Lepida (4/3 BC – ?) was the daughter of Lucius Aemilius Paullus and his wife Julia the Younger. She was the first great-grandchild of the Emperor Augustus, and at one time was a fiancée of the future Emperor Claudius. Lepida had several children with her husband, Marcus Junius Silanus, and two of her sons became consuls.

== Aemilia Lepida (died 36), wife of Drusus ==
Aemilia Lepida (died 36) was daughter of Marcus Aemilius Lepidus, consul in 6 and niece to the consul Lucius Aemilius Paullus (executed 14 AD). Despite her uncle's disgrace, and due to her father's high standing with the Roman emperors and the Senate, she married her second cousin Drusus Caesar. According to Dio she was rumoured to have been a mistress of Sejanus. Tacitus reports that during their marriage "she had pursued her husband with ceaseless accusations". In 36, she was charged with adultery with a slave and committed suicide, "since there was no question about her guilt".
