= Gaius Sallustius Passienus Crispus =

First century Roman senator, consul, and provincial governor

- Born: Visellium
- Spouse(s): Junia Calvina (possibly); Domitia; Agrippina the Younger
- Children: Sallustia Calvina (possibly)
- Father: Gaius Sallustius Crispus
- Relatives: Nero

Gaius Sallustius Passienus Crispus (Note: The order of the final two names varies in inscriptions. Suetonius calls him "Passienus Crispus", while Tacitus calls him "Sallustius Crispus"; Prosopographia Imperii Romani lists him as "Gaius Passienus Crispus".) was a prominent figure in the Roman Empire during the first century. He held the consulship twice, and was stepfather of the future emperor Nero.

== Background ==
Suetonius reports that Passienus was born at Visellium, an obscure town whose location has been lost, but is believed to have been located near Rome. He was the grandson of Lucius Passienus Rufus, consul in 4 BC. His father, who died in AD 21, was a grandnephew of the historian Gaius Sallustius Crispus (Sallust), who had no children of his own, and therefore adopted his sister's grandson as his heir. The elder Passienus assumed his uncle's names, in accordance with Roman custom, and in turn these names were passed to his son.

== Early career ==
Passienus was a regular pleader in the court of the Centumviri, which met in the Basilica Julia. Suetonius mentions a statue of Passienus, which had been set up in the Basilica. He made his first speech in the senate during the reign of Tiberius, whom he addressed politely, and whose favour he won, although Suetonius maintains that the emperor's praise was insincere. Passienus was consul for the first time in AD 27, being named suffectus from the Kalends of July, as the colleague of Publius Cornelius Lentulus, and serving out the remainder of the year.

Despite his rank and wealth, Passienus affected a humble manner in order to remain in favour with the emperors. During the reign of Caligula, he accompanied the emperor on his travels, following on foot as a token of subservience. Caligula is said to have asked him once, in private, if Passienus had ever had intercourse with his own sister, as he himself had done. Realizing that answering either in the affirmative or the negative might be dangerous, Passienus replied, "not yet", thereby avoiding the emperor's displeasure.

== Connections with the imperial family ==
Passienus may have been married to Junia Calvina and had a daughter named Sallustia Calvina with her, this woman married Publius Ostorius Scapula.

Passienus' wife, Domitia, was the sister of Gnaeus Domitius Ahenobarbus, and thus the sister-in-law of Agrippina. Domitia's first husband, Decimus Haterius Agrippa, consul in AD 22, had died in 32 after advocating the condemnation of Lucius Fulcinius Trio and Publius Memmius Regulus, the feuding consuls of the previous autumn, thus drawing the public ire on himself. Passienus married Domitia the following year, and became the stepfather of Quintus Haterius Antoninus, who would become consul under Claudius in AD 53. According to Christian Settipani, the marriage between Passienus and Domitia took place earlier, c. 20 to 25. Furthermore, he suggested that Domitia and Passienus had a daughter who married a son of Quintus Junius Blaesus, suffect consul of 26.

Shortly after his accession in 41, the emperor Claudius asked Passienus to divorce his wife, and marry Agrippina, for her husband Domitius Ahenobarbus had recently died. Agrippina was a sister of Caligula, and had married a man with a reputation for needless cruelty, who had nearly been put to death by Tiberius, and been saved only by the emperor's death. She herself had been exiled by Caligula in AD 39, due to her supposed involvement in a plot against the emperor, with her brother-in-law and alleged paramour, Marcus Aemilius Lepidus.

After her husband's death, Caligula had seized the inheritance that rightfully belonged Agrippina's young son, Lucius. Caligula was assassinated shortly thereafter, and his uncle, Claudius, eager to restore the appearance of respectability to the imperial family, recalled Agrippina from exile, restored her son's inheritance, and hoped to provide her with a worthy husband. Domitia was also the emperor's cousin, but it was more important to rehabilitate Agrippina's image, so Passienus acquiesced to Claudius' wishes, divorcing Domitia and becoming the husband of Agrippina, as well as the stepfather of the future emperor Nero.

== Downfall and legacy ==
For the term June 42 through June 43, the sortition selected Passienus proconsular governor of Asia. Ronald Syme once described this office as "of the highest dignity in the senatorial career." Then in 44, Passienus was consul for the second time, but this time as consul ordinary, with Titus Statilius Taurus as his colleague. His second consulship was a special honour, but partly symbolic, as he was expected to resign before the expiration of six months, and probably did so on the Ides of January. He was followed by Publius Pomponius Secundus, who held the fasces with Statilius until the Kalends of July.

By now, Passienus was the most prosperous of men: twice consul, the grandson of a consul, the heir of Sallust, he had twice married into the imperial family. His fortune was valued at two hundred million sestertii. He was persuaded by Agrippina to name her as his heir; this proved to be his undoing, for he died by his wife's treachery, probably poisoned, about AD 47.

Gaius Passienus Crispus was an intelligent, humble, and witty person, famous for his epigram to the effect "that the world never knew a better slave, nor a worse master", referring to the future emperor Gaius (Caligula) and his grandfather, Tiberius.

== See also ==
- Passiena gens

== Bibliography ==
- Publius Cornelius Tacitus, Annales.
- Gaius Suetonius Tranquillus, De Vita Caesarum (Lives of the Caesars, or The Twelve Caesars), De Viris Illustribus (Lives of Famous Men), "Vita Passienus Crispus" (The Life of Passienus Crispus).
- Lucius Cassius Dio Cocceianus (Cassius Dio), Roman History.
- Paul von Rohden, Elimar Klebs, & Hermann Dessau, Prosopographia Imperii Romani (The Prosopography of the Roman Empire, abbreviated PIR), Berlin (1898).
- Paul A. Gallivan, "The Fasti for the Reign of Claudius", in Classical Quarterly, vol. 28, pp. 407–426 (1978).

Political offices
Preceded by Lucius Calpurnius Piso, and Marcus Licinius Crassus Frugi as Ordinary consuls	Suffect consul of the Roman Empire; 27 with Publius Cornelius Lentulus	Succeeded by Appius Junius Silanus, and Publius Silius Nerva as Ordinary consuls
Preceded by Quintus Curtius Rufus, and Spurius Oppius as Suffect consul	Consul of the Roman Empire; 44 with Titus Statilius Taurus	Succeeded by Publius Calvisius Sabinus Pomponius Secundus as Suffect consul
