= Faustus Cornelius Sulla Felix =

Roman consul in 52 AD, later murdered by Nero, his cousin

Faustus Cornelius Sulla Felix (22 – 62 AD) was one of the lesser known figures of the Julio-Claudian dynasty of ancient Rome.

== Life ==
Felix was the son of Domitia Lepida the Younger and the suffect consul of 31, Faustus Cornelius Sulla Lucullus, a descendant of the Dictator Lucius Cornelius Sulla. His maternal grandparents were Antonia Major and Lucius Domitius Ahenobarbus. His maternal grandmother Antonia Major was a niece of the emperor Augustus and his mother, Domitia Lepida, was a great-niece of Augustus, being a granddaughter of Augustus’ sister Octavia the Younger and the triumvir Mark Antony. Felix was a maternal younger half-brother of the empress Valeria Messalina.

In 47 the emperor Claudius, who was his mother's cousin, arranged for Felix to marry his daughter, Claudia Antonia. Antonia bore Felix a son, who was reportedly frail and died before his second birthday. The boy's first birthday was celebrated privately. Felix's attachment to the imperial family brought him an early consulship in 52.

In 55, the year after the accession of the emperor Nero, the imperial freedman Pallas and the Praetorian prefect Sextus Afranius Burrus were accused of conspiring to have Felix declared emperor. The conspirators were put on trial, but Felix does not appear to have been implicated. Nero, however, began to watch his brother-in-law closely, afraid of his connection to the imperial family.

In 58 another imperial freedman falsely accused Felix of plotting to attack Nero, possibly at the latter's instigation. Nero treated Felix as proven guilty, had him exiled in 59 and confined to Massilia (modern Marseille, France).

=== Execution ===
Finally in 62, the palace guardsman Tigellinus sent assassins to kill Felix. Felix was murdered at dinner, five days after Tigellinus gave his orders, and his head transported to the palace. At times, Nero would tease his head, due to his baldness and greyness of his hair. The historian Tacitus described Felix's character as "timid and despicable" and also stated that Felix was incapable of plotting against Nero.

Now a widow, Claudia Antonia was sought as a wife by Nero, after the death of his second wife, the Empress Poppaea Sabina. When Claudia Antonia refused, Nero had her charged with attempted rebellion and executed her.

Political offices
Preceded by Claudius V, and Servius Cornelius Scipio Salvidienus Orfitus	Consul of the Roman Empire; 52 with Lucius Salvius Otho Titianus; Quintus Marcius Barea Soranus; Lucius Salvidienus Rufus Salvianus	Succeeded by Decimus Junius Silanus Torquatus, and Quintus Haterius Antoninus
