= Gnaeus Domitius Ahenobarbus (consul 32 BC) =

Roman general and politician (died 31 BC)

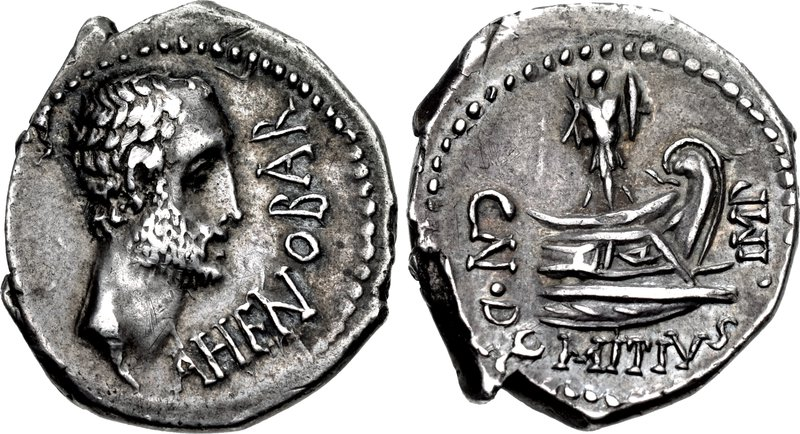
- Coin depicting Ahenobarbus on the left. It commemorates his naval victory over Gnaeus Domitius Calvinus
- Died: 31 BC
- Occupations: General and politician
- Office: Consul of Rome (32 BC)
- Spouse(s): Aemilia Lepida; Manlia
- Children: Lucius Domitius Ahenobarbus
- Parent(s): Lucius Domitius Ahenobarbus and Porcia

Gnaeus Domitius Ahenobarbus (died 31 BC) was a general and politician of ancient Rome in the 1st century BC.

== Life ==
During Caesar's civil war, Ahenobarbus was captured with his father, Lucius Domitius Ahenobarbus, at Corfinium in 49 BC, and was present at the Battle of Pharsalus in 48 BC, but did not take any further part in the war. He did not however return to Italy until 46 BC, when he was pardoned by Julius Caesar. He probably played no part in Caesar's assassination, although some writers claim that he was one of the conspirators. He followed Brutus into Macedonia after Caesar's death, and was condemned by the Lex Pedia in 43 BC as one of the murderers.

In 42 BC he commanded a fleet of fifty ships in the Ionian Sea, and gained considerable success against the Second Triumvirate, completely defeating Gnaeus Domitius Calvinus on the day of the first battle of Philippi, as the latter attempted to sail out of Brundisium. He was saluted imperator in consequence, and a record of this victory is preserved in the annexed coin, which represents a trophy placed upon the prow of a vessel. The head on the other side of the coin has a beard, in reference to the reputed origin of the Ahenobarbus family.

After the Battle of Philippi in 42 BC, Ahenobarbus conducted the war independently of Sextus Pompey, and with a fleet of seventy ships and two legions plundered the coasts of the Ionian Sea.

In 40 BC, through the mediation of Gaius Asinius Pollio, Ahenobarbus became reconciled to Mark Antony, which greatly offended Octavian. In the peace concluded with Sextus Pompeius in 39 BC, Antony provided for the safety of Ahenobarbus, and obtained for him the promise of the consulship for 32 BC. Ahenobarbus accompanied Antony on his ill-fated invasion of Parthia in 36 BC; after one particularly devastating defeat, Antony was too despondent to boost the morale of his troops, so he gave that duty to Ahenobarbus. Antony placed him in command of Bithynia, which he governed until 35 BC or perhaps after. In 35 BC he supported Gaius Furnius, governor of Asia against Pompeius.

He became consul, according to agreement, in 32 BC, in which year the open rupture took place between Antony and Octavian. With Gaius Sosius, Ahenobarbus fled from Rome to Antony at Ephesus, where he found Cleopatra with him, and endeavoured, in vain, to obtain her removal from the army. Many of the soldiers, disgusted with the conduct of Antony, offered the command to Ahenobarbus, but he preferred to desert the party altogether, and defected to Octavian shortly before the Battle of Actium in 31 BC. Even though he was suffering from a fever, he took a small boat to Octavian's side. Even though Antony was greatly upset, he still sent him all his gear, his friends and his attendants. He was not, however, present at the battle itself, as he died a few days after joining Octavian. Plutarch suggests that his death was due to "the shame of his disloyalty and treachery being exposed." Suetonius says that he was the best of his family.

== Family ==
Ahenobarbus's father, Lucius Domitius Ahenobarbus, had been consul in 54 BC. His mother was Porcia, sister of Cato the Younger and half-sister of the two Servilias: Servilia (Caesar's mistress) and Servilia Minor (second wife of Lucullus).

His wife was Aemilia Lepida and their son Lucius Domitius Ahenobarbus was married to Antonia Major, daughter of Mark Antony by Octavia the Younger. They became parents to a younger Gnaeus Domitius Ahenobarbus, and grandparents of the Roman Emperor Nero. Ahenobarbus may also have been married to a daughter of Lucius Manlius Torquatus.

== Cultural depictions ==
The character of Domitius Enobarbus in the play Antony and Cleopatra is loosely based on this man. He is Antony's friend who deserts Antony for Caesar (Act III, sc. 13), is stricken with remorse (Act IV, sc. 6), and dies (Act IV, sc. 9).

Political offices
Preceded by Imperator Caesar Augustus and Lucius Volcatius Tullus	Consul of the Roman Republic with Gaius Sosius; 32 BC	Succeeded by Imperator Caesar Augustus and Marcus Valerius Messalla Corvinus
