= Clutorius Priscus =

Roman poet (c. 20 BC – 21 AD)

Clutorius Priscus (c. 20 BC – 21 AD) was a Roman poet.

Priscus was paid an honorarium by the Roman Emperor Tiberius to produce a panegyric for his nephew and adopted son Germanicus upon his death in AD 19.

Two years later, Tiberius' son Drusus Julius Caesar fell ill but recovered. During that illness, Priscus prepared another panegyric in the hope of winning another payment. He read it to a small audience of men and women at the home of Publius Petronius in 21 AD. The consul elect Decimus Haterius Agrippa denounced him and called for him to be tried for a capital offense. Drusus himself, who had a reputation for excessive cruelty, presided over the Senate trial in the absence of the emperor at Capreae. Manius Aemilius Lepidus argued without success that the proposed death sentence was excessively harsh, given that the poem was not dangerous, merely tasteless and degrading. He also contended that a death sentence might lead Priscus to commit suicide, depriving the emperor of the ability to exercise clemency, as he often did. He suggested that Priscus be banished from Rome and have his property confiscated. The Senate supported Agrippa's position. Priscus was sentenced to death and immediately executed. Tiberius wrote a letter to the Senate following the execution of Priscus thanking them for their loyalty but expressing disapproval of their haste. This led to a revision of the law to require an interval of ten days between sentencing and execution.
