= Antonia the Elder =

1st century BC Roman noblewoman

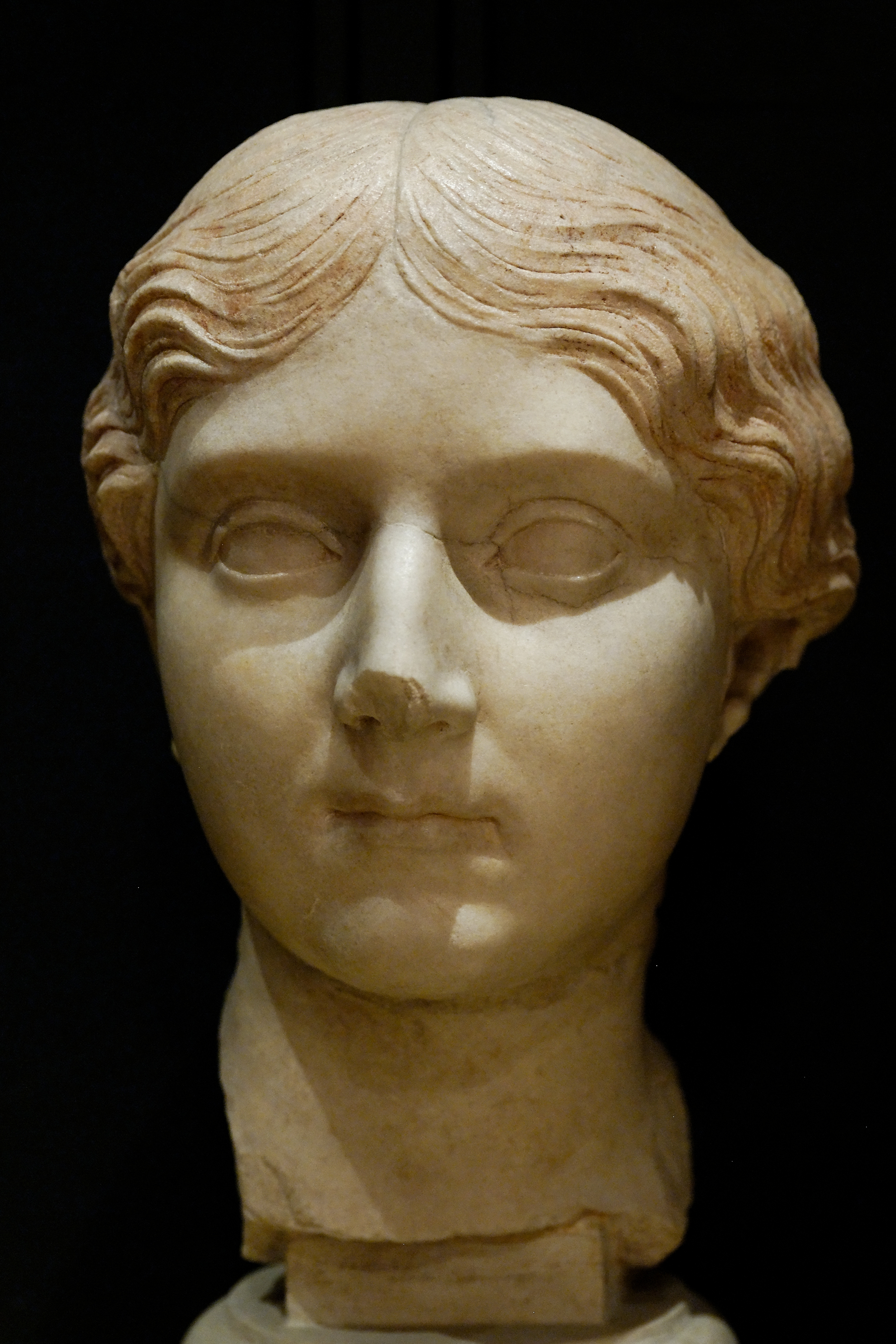
- Bust believed to be Antonia Major
- Born: August/September 39 BC; Athens, Greece
- Spouse: Lucius Domitius Ahenobarbus
- Issue: Domitia; Lucius Domitius Ahenobarbus; Domitia Lepida Major; Gnaeus Domitius Ahenobarbus; Domitia Lepida Minor
- House: Julio-Claudian dynasty
- Father: Mark Antony
- Mother: Octavia the Younger

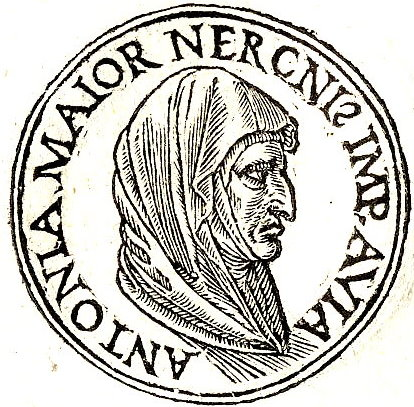
Antonia from Promptuarii Iconum Insigniorum; the inscription means: "Antonia Major, Emperor Nero's grandmother"

Antonia the Elder (Note: Also known as Antonia Major or Latin: Antonia Maior.) (born August/September 39 BC) was a niece of the first Roman emperor, Augustus, being the eldest daughter of Octavia the Younger and her second husband, the Triumvir Mark Antony. She married Lucius Domitius Ahenobarbus and became the paternal grandmother of the emperor Nero.

== Biography ==
Antonia was born in Athens, Greece, and after 36 BC she, her siblings, and her mother were brought to Rome. She was raised by her mother, her uncle, and her aunt Livia Drusilla. According to Cassius Dio, after her father died Augustus allowed her and her younger sister, Antonia Minor, to benefit from their father's estate in Rome. Although little is known of her, Antonia was held in high regard like her sister Antonia Minor, the mother of the emperor Claudius, who was celebrated for her beauty and virtue.

== Issue ==
Around 23 BC Antonia married the consul Lucius Domitius Ahenobarbus. Three of their children are known for certain:

- Domitia the Elder - ancient sources refer to her as Domitia. She married the consul Decimus Haterius Agrippa and had a son with him Quintus Haterius Antoninus. Domitia later married Gaius Sallustius Crispus Passienus, consul suffect in 27, proconsul of Asia and consul in AD 44.
- Gnaeus Domitius Ahenobarbus (PIR^{2} D127) - consul in AD 32, he married his cousin Germanicus' daughter Agrippina the Younger in 28. Agrippina and Domitius were the parents of the emperor Nero. He was accused by Tiberius, but saved by that emperor's death (Suet. Nero 5) and lived a few years longer under Caligula's reign until he died in AD 40.
- Domitia Lepida (PIR^{2} D180) - she first married her cousin, the consul Marcus Valerius Messalla Barbatus with whom she had a daughter, the empress Valeria Messalina, third wife of the emperor Claudius. After the death of her first husband, she married Faustus Cornelius Sulla Lucullus, suffect consul in AD 31, and had a son with him, Faustus Cornelius Sulla Felix (who would become consul in AD 52). At the beginning of Claudius' reign, she married Appius Junius Silanus, consul in AD 28, who was put to death in AD 42. She outlived her daughter, Messalina.

It is also likely that they had another son named Lucius Domitius Ahenobarbus (born between 20 and 17 BC), and possibly also a third daughter (born around 23 BC). Syme thinks its possible that the daughter may have lived to marry and produce children, but probably died before the reign of Caligula.

== Cultural depictions ==
Many scholars think the Ara Pacis (an altar from the Augustan Era) displays Gnaeus Domitius Ahenobarbus and his elder sister. The woman behind Domitia and Domitius is allegedly their mother Antonia Major and the man next to Antonia Major is allegedly her husband Lucius Domitius Ahenobarbus, so identified in 1903 by Alfred von Domaszewski. However, the only son of Antonia and Ahenobarbus was born in 1 BC, which is after the Ara Pacis was completed and inaugurated. This means the boy on the frieze cannot be the infamous Gnaeus (father of Nero). Sir Ronald Syme has argued the two children are actually a lost elder son Lucius and another unknown sister. In reality, the family seems to be another family entirely, probably the family of one of Augustus's other three nieces. Gnaeus was born in 1 BC and had two older sisters. No surviving source mentions older siblings who died in childhood, whereas there are other branches of the imperial family that had exactly one son and one daughter between 21 and 15 BC.

== Sources ==
- Henry Gardiner Adams, ed. (1857). "Antonia Major". A Cyclopaedia of Female Biography: 55. Wikidata Q115751903.
- E. Groag, A. Stein, L. Petersen - e.a. (edd.), Prosopographia Imperii Romani saeculi I, II et III, Berlin, 1933 - . (PIR^{2})
