= Decimus Haterius Agrippa =

Early 1st century AD Roman plebeian tribune, praetor and consul

- Died: 32 AD
- Spouse: Domitia Lepida Major
- Children: Quintus Haterius Antoninus
- Parents: Quintus Haterius (father); Vipsania (mother)

Decimus Haterius Agrippa (c. 13 BC – AD 32) was a Roman plebeian tribune, praetor and consul. He was the son of the orator and senator Quintus Haterius and his wife Vipsania.

== Career ==
He became plebeian tribune in AD 15 and vetoed proposals. Agrippa advanced to praetor in 17. Agrippa was ordinary consul in 22 with Gaius Sulpicius Galba as his colleague. Agrippa at one time strongly urged the emperor Tiberius to nominate a limited number of political candidates from each family. He died in 32, a victim of Tiberius' reign of terror. Tacitus describes him as a "somnolent creature".

== Personal life ==
He married Domitia, daughter of Antonia Major and Lucius Domitius Ahenobarbus. Their only child was Quintus Haterius Antoninus (consul in AD 53).

== See also ==
- Clutorius Priscus
- List of Roman consuls

Political offices
| Preceded by Mamercus Aemilius Scaurus, and Gnaeus Tremellius as suffect consuls | Consul of the Roman Empire; 22 with Gaius Sulpicius Galba | Succeeded by Gaius Asinius Pollio, and Gaius Antistius Vetus as ordinary consuls |
