= Domitia (aunt of Messalina) =

Roman noblewoman (c. 8 BCE – 59 CE)

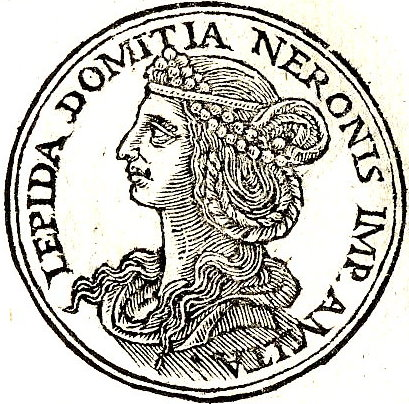
- Domitia from Promptuarii Iconum Insigniorum
- Born: c. 8 BC
- Died: June 59 AD
- Spouse(s): Decimus Haterius Agrippa; Gaius Sallustius Crispus Passienus; Quintus Junius Blaesus (possibly)
- Children: Quintus Haterius Antoninus; Sallustia (possibly); Junius Blaesus (possibly)
- Parents: Lucius Domitius Ahenobarbus (father); Antonia Major (mother)
- Family: Julio-Claudian dynasty

Domitia (c. 8 BC–June 59) was the oldest child of Antonia Major and Lucius Domitius Ahenobarbus, and possibly the oldest granddaughter to triumvir Mark Antony by Octavia Minor, a great-niece of the Roman Emperor Augustus, first cousin once removed to the Emperor Caligula (as well as his brother-in-law's sister), first cousin to the Emperor Claudius, maternal aunt to the Empress Valeria Messalina, and paternal aunt to Emperor Nero.

== History ==
=== Early life ===
She had two younger siblings: Domitia Lepida and Gnaeus Domitius Ahenobarbus (cos. AD 32). The date of her birth is not recorded and can be only estimated as no later than 7 BC, but possibly as much as 10 years earlier, if one would allow a long delay between her birth and those of her two siblings.

=== Marriages ===
Domitia was probably married to a cousin of Sejanus named Quintus Junius Blaesus with whom she likely had a son named Junius Blaesus who served as a governor under emperor Vitellius. The younger Blaesus was supposedly put to death by Vitellius for bragging about his descent from Mark Antony, which made Vitellius see him as a potential threat to power.

She married the consul Decimus Haterius Agrippa, who died in 32 as a victim of Tiberius' reign of terror. Domitia bore Agrippa a son, Quintus Haterius Antoninus (cos. AD 53) in approximately 20.

Domitia married the witty, wealthy, and influential Gaius Sallustius Crispus Passienus. Crispus was the adopted grandson and biological great-great nephew of the historian Sallust. After January 41, Crispus divorced Domitia, so he could marry Domitia's former sister-in-law Agrippina the Younger, who had recently returned from exile. Thereby, Crispus became the stepfather of Agrippina's son Lucius Domitius Ahenobarbus (Nero), who was Domitia's nephew. Crispus soon died mysteriously, leaving a fortune to Agrippina and her son.

Alternatively, Christian Settipani had suggested that Domitia wasn't married to Blaesus, but instead that her daughter from her marriage to Crispus became the wife of Blaesus's son. According to his hypothesis, the marriage between Domitia and Crispus took place earlier, c. 20-25.

=== Later life ===
During the reigns of Caligula, Claudius and Nero, Domitia was an influential rival to Agrippina. In June 59, she died while confined to a bed with severe constipation. Nero was visiting her at the time, and she commented that when he shaved his beard (a Roman symbolic act, usually performed during a ceremony at the age of twenty-one), she would gladly die peacefully. Nero turned to those with him and joked, "I'll take it off at once." According to a rumor, he then ordered the doctors to administer a fatal dose of laxative to his aunt and seized her property while she was dying. Modern scholars such as Miriam T. Griffin distrust the claim that Nero poisoned her.
