= Lucius Domitius Ahenobarbus (consul 16 BC) =

Roman senator (49 BC–25 AD)

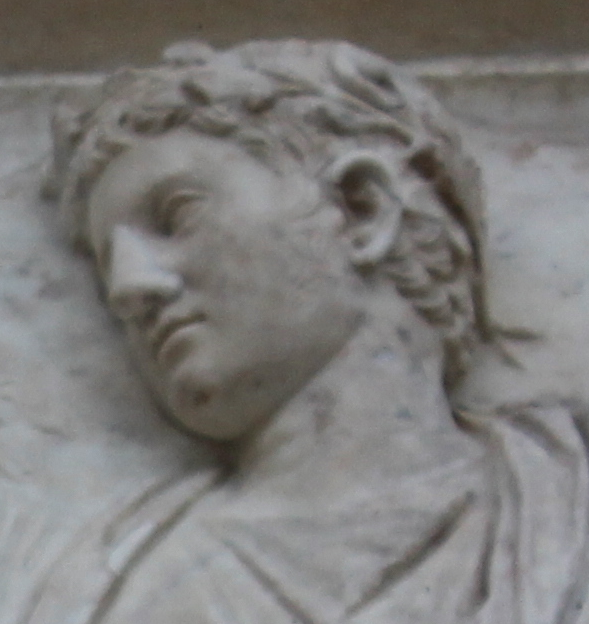
- This relief on the Ara Pacis has been identified by some experts as depicting Ahenobarbus.
- Born: 49 BC
- Died: AD 25 (aged 74)
- Spouse: Antonia Major
- Children: Domitia; Lucius Domitius Ahenobarbus; Domitia Lepida Major; Domitia Lepida Minor; Gnaeus Domitius Ahenobarbus
- Parent(s): Gnaeus Domitius Ahenobarbus; Aemilia Lepida

Lucius Domitius Ahenobarbus (49 BC – 25 AD) was the son of consul Gnaeus Domitius Ahenobarbus and Aemilia Lepida. His mother was a paternal relative of the triumvir Marcus Aemilius Lepidus. His paternal grandmother was Porcia (sister to Cato the Younger). Ahenobarbus married Antonia Major (niece of emperor Augustus) and through his son with her he became the grandfather of emperor Nero.

== Life ==
As a young man Lucius was a renowned and devoted charioteer, perhaps to the point of obsession. He was betrothed in 36 BC, at the meeting of Octavian and Mark Antony at Tarentum, to Antonia Major, the daughter of the latter by Octavia. He was aedile in 22 BC and consul in 16 BC. After his consulship, he served as governor of Africa from 13/12 BC. He was later probably the successor of Tiberius in Germania, where he commanded the Roman army and crossed the Elbe, during which he set up an altar to Augustus, and penetrated further into the country than any of his predecessors had done. He also built a walkway, called the pontes longi, over the marshes between the Rhine River and the Ems River. In AD 15 the Battle at Pontes Longi was fought along this walkway. For these achievements he received the insignia of a triumph. He died in AD 25.

== Legacy ==
Suetonius described him as "arrogant, cruel, notorious and extravagant" and records numerous instances of his disrespect, including to censor Lucius Munatius Plancus, to a proconsul of Africa, and to a legate of Illyricum. In his praetorship and consulship he brought Roman equites and married women on the stage to perform in pantomimes, which rankled because in Rome acting was considered to be low-class. He exhibited shows of wild beasts in every quarter of the city, and his gladiatorial combats were conducted with such excessive bloodshed that Augustus was obliged to put some restraint upon them.

In contemporary popular culture, the Domitius plays a significant role in the second season of Domina (2023), a historical drama by the Sky network.

== Family ==
He had at least three children with Antonia Major: Domitia Lepida the Elder, Domitia Lepida the Younger (mother of the Empress Valeria Messalina) and Gnaeus Domitius Ahenobarbus (the biological father of Emperor Nero). The couple may also have had another son named Lucius, and a third daughter.

== See also ==
- List of Roman consuls
- Domitia gens

Political offices
Preceded by Gaius Furnius; Gaius Junius Silanus	Roman consul 16 BC with Publius Cornelius Scipio	Succeeded by Marcus Livius Drusus Libo; Lucius Calpurnius Piso
