= Quintus Haterius Antoninus =

Roman consul 53 AD

Quintus Haterius Antoninus or known as Antoninus was a Roman senator, who was active during the reign of Claudius and Nero.

== Life ==
He was suffect consul in the year AD 53 as the colleague of Decimus Junius Silanus Torquatus.

Antoninus was the only child to Domitia Lepida the Elder and Decimus Haterius Agrippa, consul in 22. His paternal grandfather was the influential orator and senator Quintus Haterius; Ronald Syme suggests that his paternal grandmother was the daughter of Marcus Vipsanius Agrippa and Caecilia Attica. Sabina Tariverdieva believes her to be the daughter of Agrippa's sister Vipsania Polla.

By the year 58 Antoninus had squandered his inheritance through extravagances, when emperor Nero gave him a yearly stipend of 500,000 sesterces; Marcus Valerius Messalla Corvinus and Aurelius Cotta, who had likewise squandered their inheritances, also received yearly stipends from the emperor. According to Seneca the Younger, Haterius Antoninus was considered by some as a professional legacy hunter.

Political offices
Preceded by Faustus Cornelius Sulla Felix, and Lucius Salvidienus Rufus Salvianus	Consul of the Roman Empire; 53 with Decimus Junius Silanus Torquatus	Succeeded by Publius Trebonius, and Quintus Caecina Primus
