= Tiberius =

Roman emperor from AD 14 to 37

- Princeps
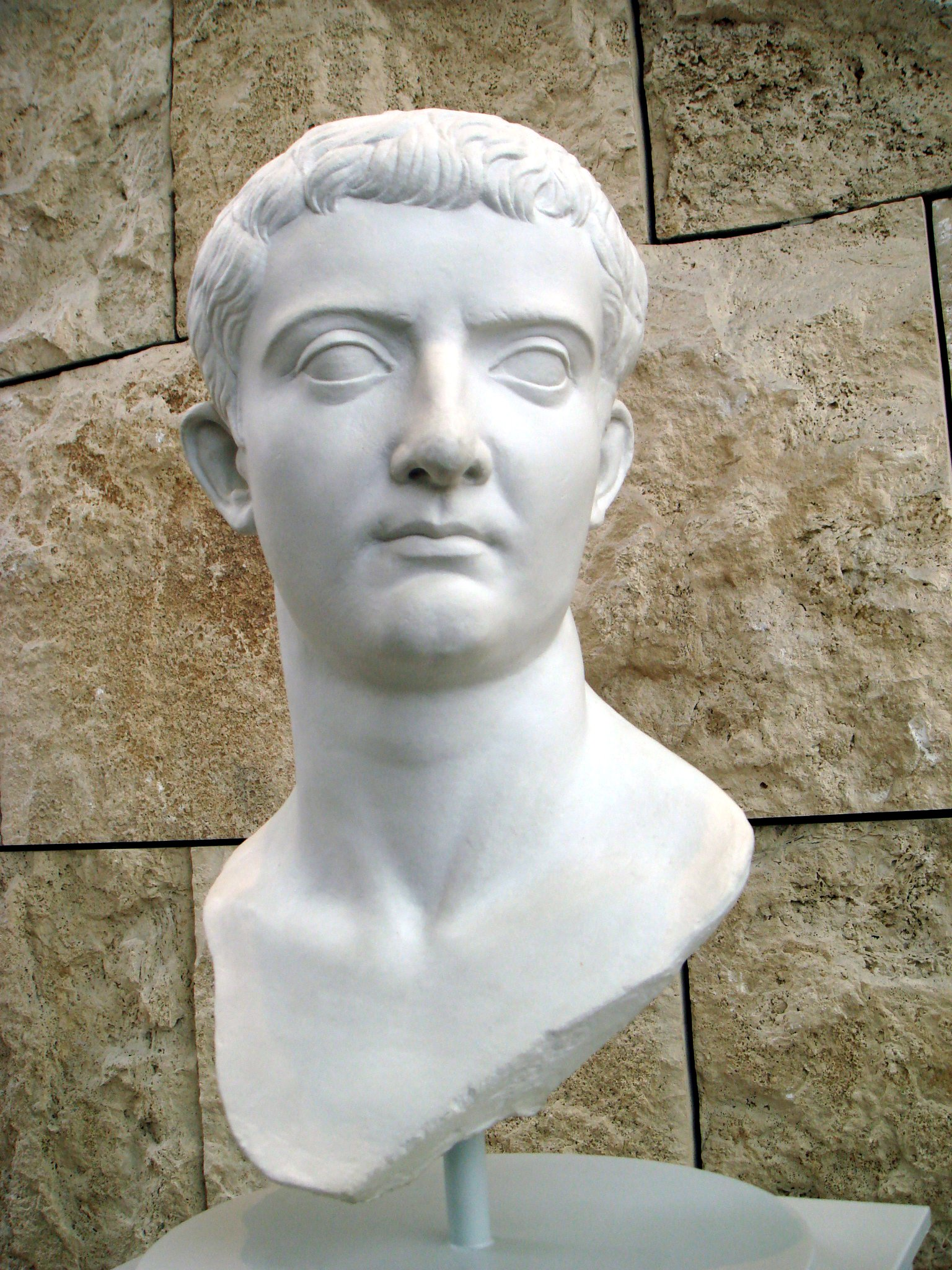
- Roman marble bust of Tiberius

Roman emperor
- Reign: 17 September 14 – 16 March 37
- Predecessor: Augustus
- Successor: Caligula
- Born: 16 November 42 BC; Rome, Roman Republic
- Died: 16 March 37 AD (aged 77); Misenum, Roman Empire
- Burial: Mausoleum of Augustus, Rome
- Spouses: Vipsania Agrippina (m. 19 BC; div. 11 BC); Julia the Elder (m. 11 BC; div. 2 BC)
- Issue more...: Drusus Julius Caesar; Germanicus (adopted)
Names
- Tiberius Claudius Nero (42 BC – AD 4); Tiberius Julius Caesar (AD 4–14)
Regnal name
- Tiberius Caesar Augustus (Note: Tiberius generally refrained from using the nomen Julius, but he is still called as such in a few inscriptions.)
- Dynasty: Julio-Claudian
- Father: Tiberius Claudius Nero; Augustus (adoptive)
- Mother: Livia
- Office: Quaestor (24 BC); Praetor (16 BC); Propraetor (Gaul, 15 BC); Consul (13, 7 BC, 18, 21, 31 AD); Tribunicia Potestas (6– 1 BC, 4–37 AD); Pontifex Maximus (from 14 AD); Imperator (VIII)

Tiberius Julius Caesar Augustus (Note: Sometimes referred to as Tiberius I, in reference to the later Eastern emperors Tiberius II Constantine and Tiberius III.) (/taɪˈbɪəriəs/ ty-BEER-ee-əs; 16 November 42 BC – 16 March AD 37) was the second Roman emperor from AD 14 until his death in 37, reigning as the second ruler of the Julio-Claudian dynasty. He succeeded his stepfather Augustus, the first Roman emperor. Tiberius was born in Rome in 42 BC to politician Tiberius Claudius Nero and his wife, Livia Drusilla. In 38 BC, Livia divorced Nero and married Augustus. Following the untimely deaths of Augustus's two grandsons and adopted heirs, Gaius and Lucius Caesar, Tiberius was designated Augustus's successor. Prior to this, Tiberius had proved himself an able diplomat and one of the most successful Roman generals. His conquests of Pannonia, Dalmatia, Raetia, and (temporarily) parts of Germania laid the foundations for the empire's northern frontier.

Early in his career, Tiberius was happily married to Vipsania, daughter of Augustus's boyhood friend, distinguished general and intended heir, Marcus Vipsanius Agrippa. They had a son, Drusus Julius Caesar. After Agrippa died, Augustus had Tiberius divorce Vipsania and marry his step-sister Julia, Agrippa's widow and Augustus' daughter; Tiberius relented. This second marriage proved scandalous, deeply unhappy, and childless; ultimately, Julia was sent into exile by her father. Around 4 AD Augustus had Tiberius adopt his nephew, the able and popular Germanicus, as his son and heir, passing over Tiberius's son Drusus. On Augustus's death in AD 14, Tiberius became princeps at the age of 55. He seems to have taken on the responsibilities of head of state with great reluctance and perhaps a genuine sense of inadequacy in the role, compared to the capable, self-confident and charismatic Augustus.

From the outset, Tiberius had a difficult, resentful relationship with the Senate and suspected many plots against him. Nevertheless, he proved to be an effective and efficient administrator. After the deaths of his nephew Germanicus in AD 19 and his son Drusus in 23, Tiberius became reclusive and aloof. In 26 he permanently removed himself from Rome and left administration largely in the hands of his ambitious praetorian prefect Sejanus. His authority in Rome on behalf of Tiberius came to an abrupt end in 31, when Tiberius had Sejanus executed for treason and replaced with Macro. When Tiberius died in 37, he was succeeded by his grand-nephew and adopted grandson, Germanicus's son Caligula, whose lavish building projects and varyingly successful military endeavours drained much of the wealth that Tiberius had accumulated in the public and Imperial coffers through good management.

Tiberius allowed the worship of his divine Genius in only one temple, in Rome's eastern provinces, and promoted restraint in the empire-wide cult to the deceased Augustus. When Tiberius died, he was given a sumptuous funeral befitting his office, but no divine honours. He came to be remembered as a dark, reclusive and sombre ruler who never really wanted to be emperor; Pliny the Elder called him "the gloomiest of men".

== Early life ==
=== Family and youth ===
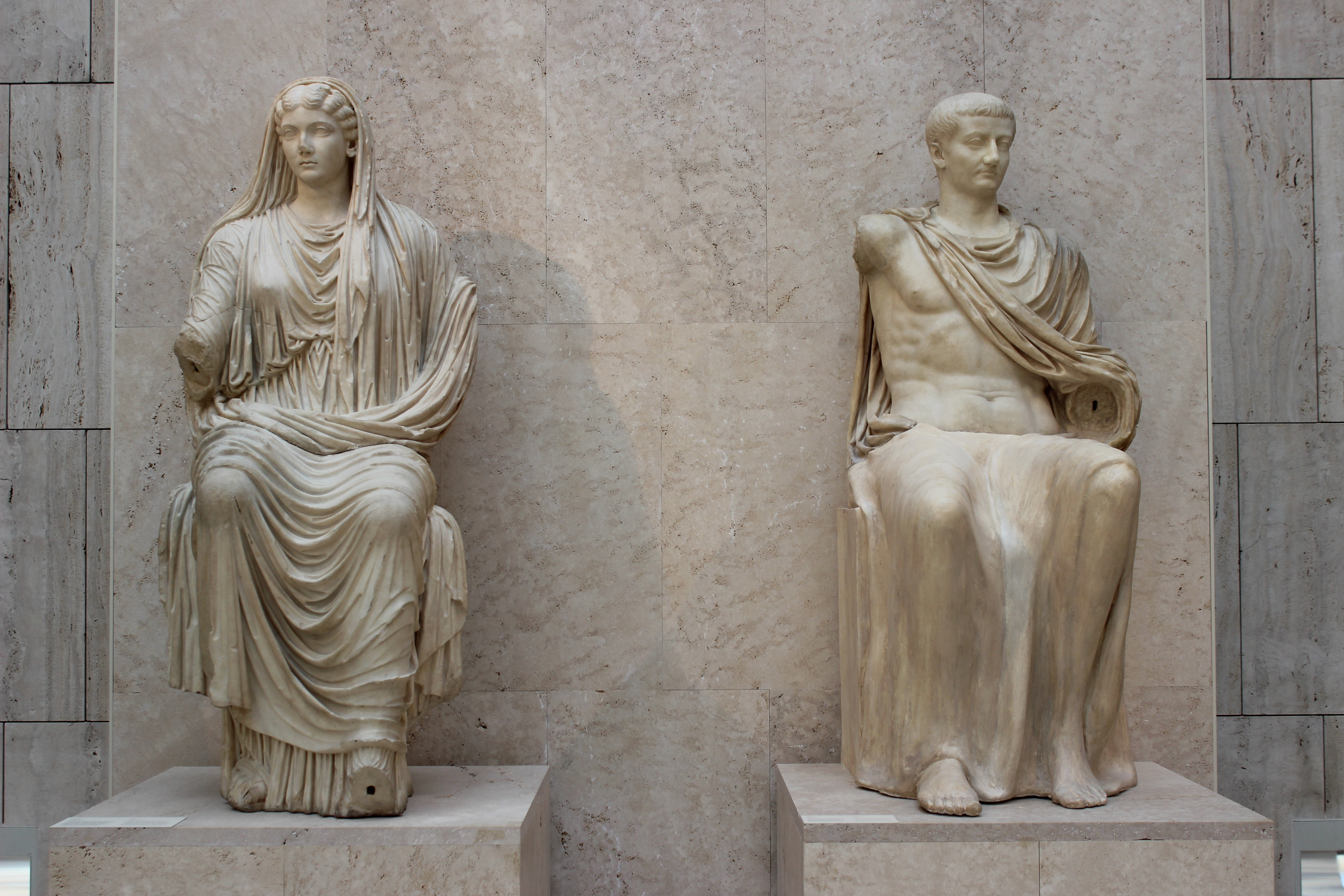
Tiberius and his mother Livia, AD 14–19. National Museum of Archaeology (Madrid)

Tiberius was born in Rome on 16 November 42 BC to Tiberius Claudius Nero and Livia Drusilla. Both of his biological parents belonged to the gens Claudia, an ancient patrician family that came to prominence in the early years of the republic. His mother was also a member of the Livii family, an ancient plebeian but prominent family, through the adoption into it of his maternal grandfather. Little is recorded of Tiberius's early life. In 39 BC, Livia divorced Tiberius Nero and, despite being pregnant again by Nero, married Octavian, later known as Augustus. In 38 BC, his brother, Nero Claudius Drusus, was born. In 32 BC, Tiberius, at the age of nine, delivered the eulogy for his biological father at the rostra. In 29 BC, he rode next to the triumphal chariot of his step-father Octavian in celebration of the defeat of Antony and Cleopatra at Actium.

=== Succession question ===
In 23 BC, Augustus became gravely ill, and his possible death threatened to plunge the Roman world into even more civil conflict. Historians generally agree that it is during this time that the question of Augustus's heir became most acute, and while Augustus had seemed to indicate that Agrippa and Marcellus would carry on his position in the event of his death, the ambiguity of succession became Augustus's chief problem. In response, a series of potential heirs seem to have been selected, among them Tiberius and his brother Drusus. In 24 BC, at the age of eighteen, Tiberius entered politics under Augustus's direction, receiving the position of quaestor, and was granted the right to stand for election as praetor and consul five years in advance of the age required by law. Similar provisions were made for Drusus.

== Civil and military career ==
=== Early career and marriage ===
Shortly thereafter, Tiberius began appearing in court as an advocate, and it was presumably at this time that his interest in Greek rhetoric began. In 20 BC, Tiberius went east to join Augustus. The Parthian Empire had previously captured the standards of the legions under the command of Marcus Licinius Crassus (53 BC) (at the Battle of Carrhae), Decidius Saxa (40 BC), and Mark Antony (36 BC) and, after negotiations with Parthia's King Phraates IV, either Augustus or Tiberius, or perhaps both together, were able to reclaim them for Rome. Tiberius then led a sizeable force into Armenia, presumably to establish it as a Roman client state and end the threat it posed on the Roman-Parthian border. Augustus was able to reach a compromise whereby the standards were returned, and Armenia remained a neutral territory between the two powers.

Tiberius married Vipsania Agrippina, the daughter of Augustus's close friend and most famed general, Marcus Vipsanius Agrippa. He was appointed to the position of praetor, and was sent with his legions to assist his brother Drusus in campaigns in the west. While Drusus focused his forces in Gallia Narbonensis and along the German frontier, Tiberius combated the tribes in the Alps and within Transalpine Gaul, conquering Raetia. In 15 BC he discovered the sources of the Danube, and soon afterward the bend of the middle course. Returning to Rome in 13 BC, Tiberius was appointed as consul, and around this same time his son, Drusus Julius Caesar, was born.

Agrippa's death in 12 BC elevated Tiberius and Drusus with respect to the succession. At Augustus's request in 11 BC, Tiberius divorced Vipsania and married Julia the Elder, Augustus's daughter and Agrippa's widow. Tiberius was very reluctant to do this, as Julia had made advances to him when she was married, and Tiberius was happily married. His new marriage with Julia was happy at first, but turned sour. Suetonius claims that when Tiberius ran into Vipsania again, he followed her home crying and begging forgiveness. Soon afterwards, Tiberius met with Augustus, and steps were taken to ensure that Tiberius and Vipsania would never meet again. Tiberius continued to be elevated by Augustus, and after Agrippa's death and his brother Drusus's death in 9 BC, seemed the clear candidate for succession. As such, in 12 BC he received military commissions in Pannonia and Germania, both areas highly volatile and of key importance to Augustan policy.

=== Military campaigns ===
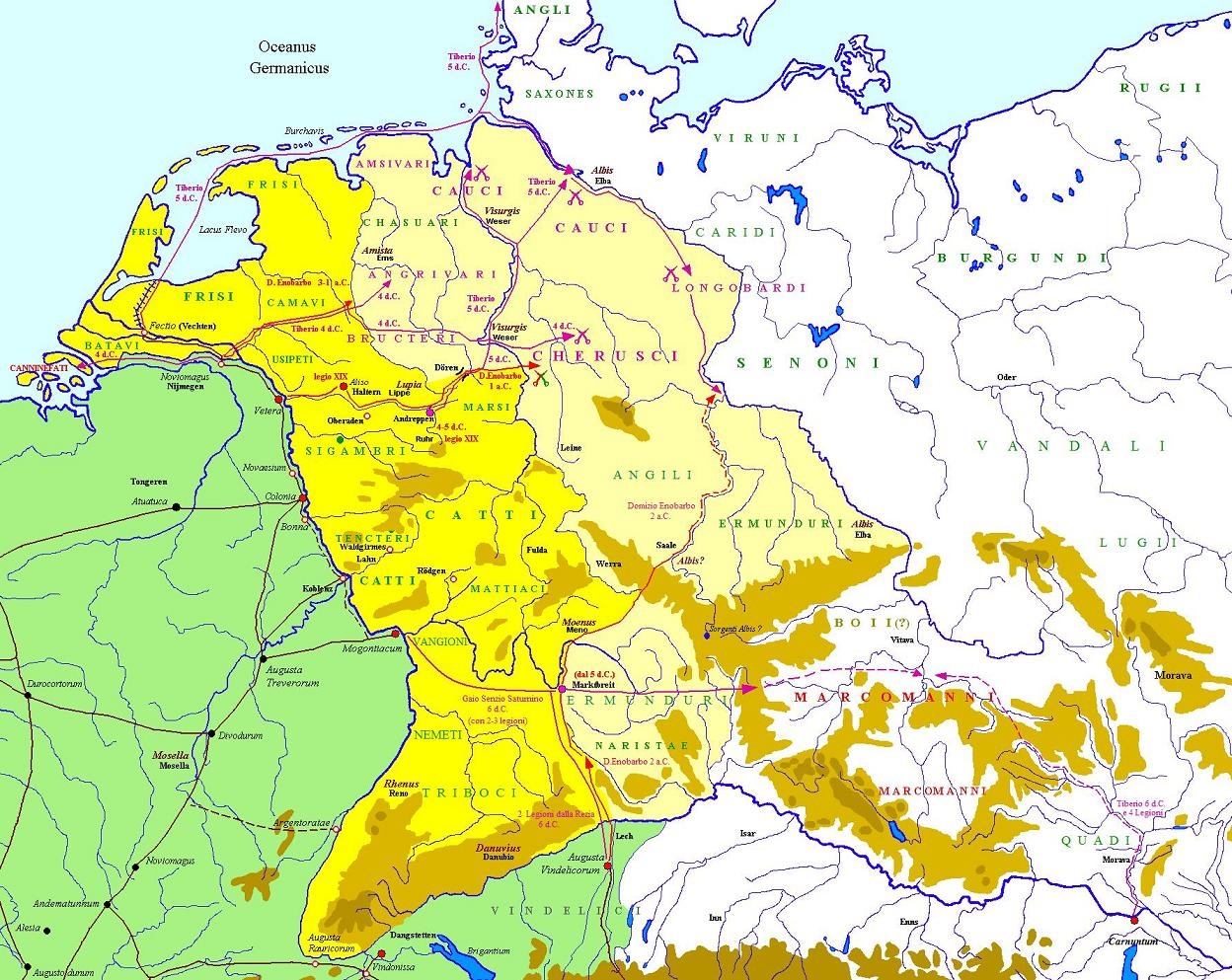
The campaigns of Tiberius, Ahenobarbus, and Saturninus in Germania between 6 BC and 1 BC

In 6 BC, Tiberius launched a pincer movement against the Marcomanni. Setting out northwest from Carnuntum on the Danube with four legions, Tiberius passed through Quadi territory in order to invade Marcomanni territory from the east. Meanwhile, general Gaius Sentius Saturninus would depart east from Moguntiacum on the Rhine with two or three legions, pass through newly annexed Hermunduri territory, and attack the Marcomanni from the west. The campaign was a resounding success, but Tiberius could not subjugate the Marcomanni because he was soon summoned to the Rhine frontier to protect Rome's new conquests in Germania. He returned to Rome and was consul for a second time in 7 BC, and in 6 BC was granted tribunician power (tribunicia potestas) and control in the East, positions that Agrippa had held before him.

== Midlife ==
=== Retirement to Rhodes ===
In 6 BC, while on the verge of accepting command in the East and becoming the second-most powerful man in Rome, Tiberius announced his withdrawal from politics and retired to Rhodes. The motives for Tiberius's withdrawal are unclear. Some historians have speculated that Tiberius and Drusus were only ever intended as caretakers, and would have been swept aside once Julia's two sons by Agrippa, Gaius and Lucius, were adopted as Augustus's heirs and came of age. The promiscuous and very public behaviour of his unhappily married wife, Julia, may have also played a part. Tacitus understood this to be Tiberius's innermost reason for moving to Rhodes, a reflection of his hatred of Julia and his longing for Vipsania. Tiberius, forbidden to see the woman he loved, found himself married to a woman he loathed, and publicly humiliated by her nighttime escapades in the Roman Forum.

Whatever Tiberius's motives, his withdrawal was almost disastrous for Augustus's succession plans. Gaius and Lucius were still in their early teens, and Augustus, now 57 years old, had no immediate successor. There was no longer a guarantee of a peaceful transfer of power after Augustus's death, nor a guarantee that his family, and therefore his family's allies, would continue to hold power should the position of Princeps survive. Somewhat melodramatic stories tell of Augustus pleading with Tiberius to stay, even going so far as to stage a serious illness. Tiberius's response was to anchor off the shore of Ostia until word came that Augustus had survived, then sailing straightway for Rhodes. Tiberius reportedly regretted his departure and requested to return to Rome several times, but each time Augustus refused his requests.

=== Heir to Augustus ===
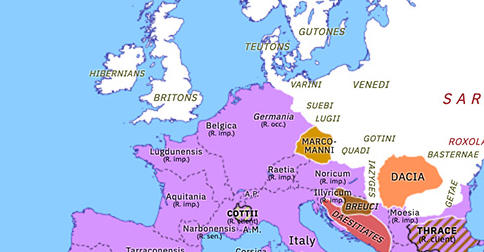
In AD 1, Augustus sent Tiberius to subdue the Germanic tribes on the Rhine frontier. In his campaigns, Tiberius extended the Roman border as far as the Elbe but was forced to cancel plans to conquer the Suevic Marcomanni when revolt broke out in Illyria in AD 6.

With Tiberius's departure, succession rested solely on Augustus's two young grandsons, Lucius and Gaius Caesar. The situation became more precarious in AD 2 with the death of Lucius. Augustus, with perhaps some pressure from Livia, allowed Tiberius to return to Rome as a private citizen and nothing more. In AD 4, Gaius was killed in Armenia, and Augustus had no other choice but to turn to Tiberius. The death of Gaius initiated a flurry of activity in the household of Augustus. Tiberius was adopted in 26 June as full son and heir, and in turn he was required to adopt his nephew Germanicus, the son of his brother Nero Claudius Drusus and Augustus's niece Antonia Minor. Along with his adoption, Tiberius received tribunician power as well as a share of Augustus's maius imperium, something that even Marcus Agrippa may never have had. In AD 7, Agrippa Postumus, a younger brother of Gaius and Lucius, was disowned by Augustus and banished to the island of Pianosa, to live in solitary confinement.

Thus, when in AD 13, the powers held by Tiberius were made equal, rather than second, to Augustus's own powers, he was, for all intents and purposes, a "co-Princeps" with Augustus, and, in the event of the latter's passing, would simply continue to rule without an interregnum or possible upheaval.

However, according to Suetonius, after a two-year stint in Germania, which lasted from AD 10–12,

"Tiberius returned and celebrated the triumph which he had postponed, accompanied also by his generals, for whom he had obtained the triumphal regalia. And before turning to enter the Capitol, he dismounted from his chariot and fell at the knees of his father, who was presiding over the ceremonies." "Since the consuls caused a law to be passed soon after this that he should govern the provinces jointly with Augustus and hold the census with him, he set out for Illyricum on the conclusion of the lustral ceremonies."

Thus, according to Suetonius, these ceremonies and the declaration of his "co-Princeps" took place in the year AD 12, after Tiberius's return from Germania. "But he was at once recalled, and finding Augustus in his last illness but still alive, he spent an entire day with him in private." Augustus died on 19 August AD 14, a month before his 76th birthday and exactly 56 years after he first assumed the consulship. He was cremated with all due ceremony and, as had been arranged beforehand, deified, his will read, and Tiberius, now a middle-aged man at 55, was confirmed as his sole surviving heir. Tiberius peacefully took power, unchallenged by any rivals.

== Emperor ==
=== Early reign ===
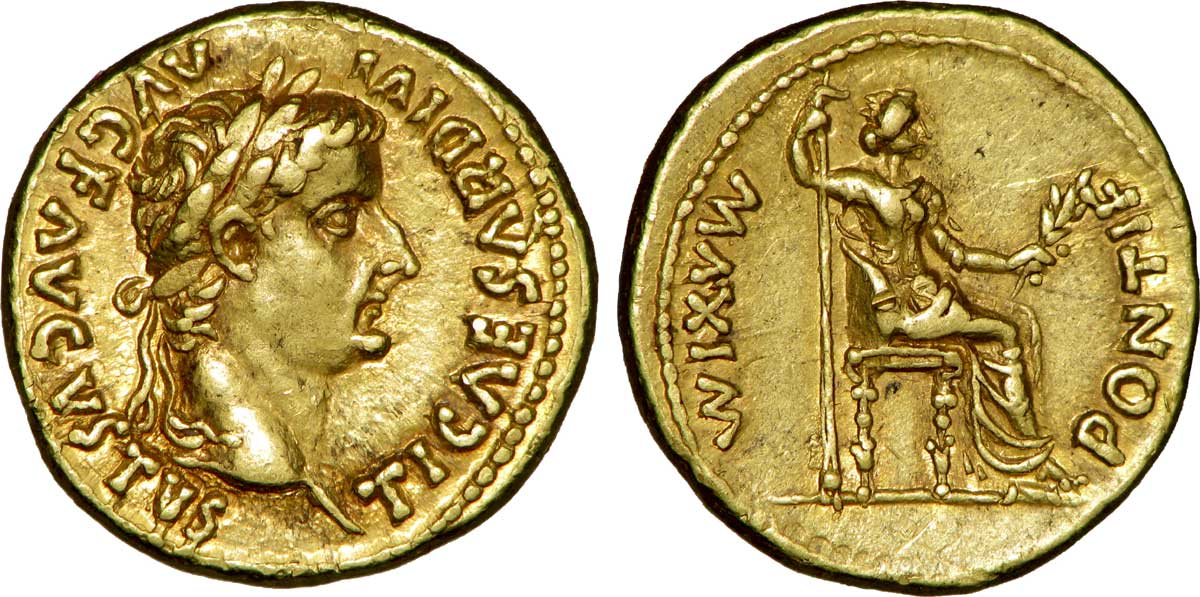
Aureus of Tiberius, c. AD 27–30. Caption: TI. CAESAR DIVI AVG. F. AVGVSTVS / MAXIM. PONTIF.

On 17 September, Tiberius called the Senate to validate his position as Princeps, and, as had Augustus before him, grant himself its powers. Tiberius already had the administrative and political powers of the Princeps, but he lacked the titles of Augustus and Pater Patriae ("Father of the country"), and refused the Civic Crown. (Note: A crown made from laurel and oak. It had been awarded to Augustus for "saving the lives of Roman citizens".) Like Augustus before him, Tiberius may have sought to represent himself as a reluctant yet devoted public servant, no more than an ordinary citizen who wanted to serve the state and people to the best of his ability, but his refusal of these titular, quasi-religious honours, and his reluctance to accept the full powers of a Princeps were taken as insults to the elite who offered them; signs of hypocrisy, not humility. According to Tacitus, Tiberius derided the Senate as "men fit to be slaves". Antagonism between Tiberius and his senate seems to have been a feature of his rule. In his first few years as emperor, Tiberius seems to have wanted the Senate to act alone, with no reference to him or his responsibilities as "first Senator". His direct orders were rather vague, inspiring debates on what he actually meant, rather than passing his legislation.

=== Germanicus ===
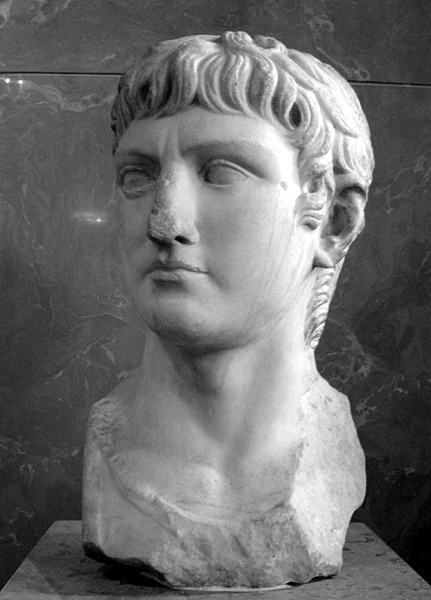
A bust of the adopted son of Tiberius, Germanicus

The Roman legions in Pannonia and Germania had not been paid the bonuses promised to them by Augustus, and showed early signs of mutiny when it was clear that a response from Tiberius was not forthcoming.

Germanicus and Tiberius's son, Drusus Julius Caesar, were dispatched with a small force to quell the uprising and bring the legions back in line. Germanicus took charge of the mutinous troops and led them on a short campaign across the Rhine into Germanic territory, promising that whatever treasure they could grab would count as their bonus. Germanicus's forces took over all the territory between the Rhine and the Elbe. They took control of the Teutoburg forest, where three Roman legions and their auxiliary cohorts, led by Publius Quinctilius Varus, had been annihilated by Germanic tribes several years before. Germanicus took back the legionary standards lost in that disaster, saving them from the disgrace of captivity. These bold and successful actions increased Germanicus's already high popular standing. After his return to Rome, Germanicus was awarded a full triumph, which he celebrated in AD 17. It was the first full triumph held since Augustus's own in 29 BC.

In AD 18, Germanicus was granted control over the eastern part of the empire, like Agrippa and Tiberius before him. This was interpreted as a sign that he would be Tiberius's successor; but Germanicus died just over a year later, having accused Gnaeus Calpurnius Piso, the governor of Syria, of poisoning him.

The Pisones had been longtime supporters of the Claudians and had allied themselves with the young Octavian after his marriage to Livia, the mother of Tiberius. Germanicus's death and accusations indicted the new Princeps. Piso was placed on trial and, according to Tacitus, threatened to implicate Tiberius. Whether the governor actually could connect the Princeps to the death of Germanicus is unknown; rather than continuing to stand trial when it became evident that the Senate was against him, Piso committed suicide.

In AD 22, Tiberius shared his tribunician authority with his son Drusus, and began making yearly excursions to Campania that reportedly became longer and longer every year. In AD 23, Drusus died in mysterious circumstances, and Tiberius seems to have made no effort to elevate a replacement. In AD 26, Tiberius moved to an imperial villa-complex he had inherited from Augustus, on the island of Capri. It was just off the coast of Campania, which was a traditional holiday retreat for Rome's upper classes, particularly those who valued cultured leisure and a Hellenised lifestyle.

=== Tiberius in Capri, with Sejanus in Rome ===
Lucius Aelius Sejanus had served the imperial family for almost twenty years when he became Praetorian Prefect in AD 15. As Tiberius became more embittered with the position of Princeps, he began to depend more and more upon the limited secretariat left to him by Augustus, and specifically upon Sejanus and the Praetorians. In AD 17 or 18, Tiberius had trimmed the ranks of the Praetorian Guard responsible for the defence of the city, and had moved it from encampments outside of the city walls into the city itself, giving Sejanus access to somewhere between 6,000 and 9,000 troops.

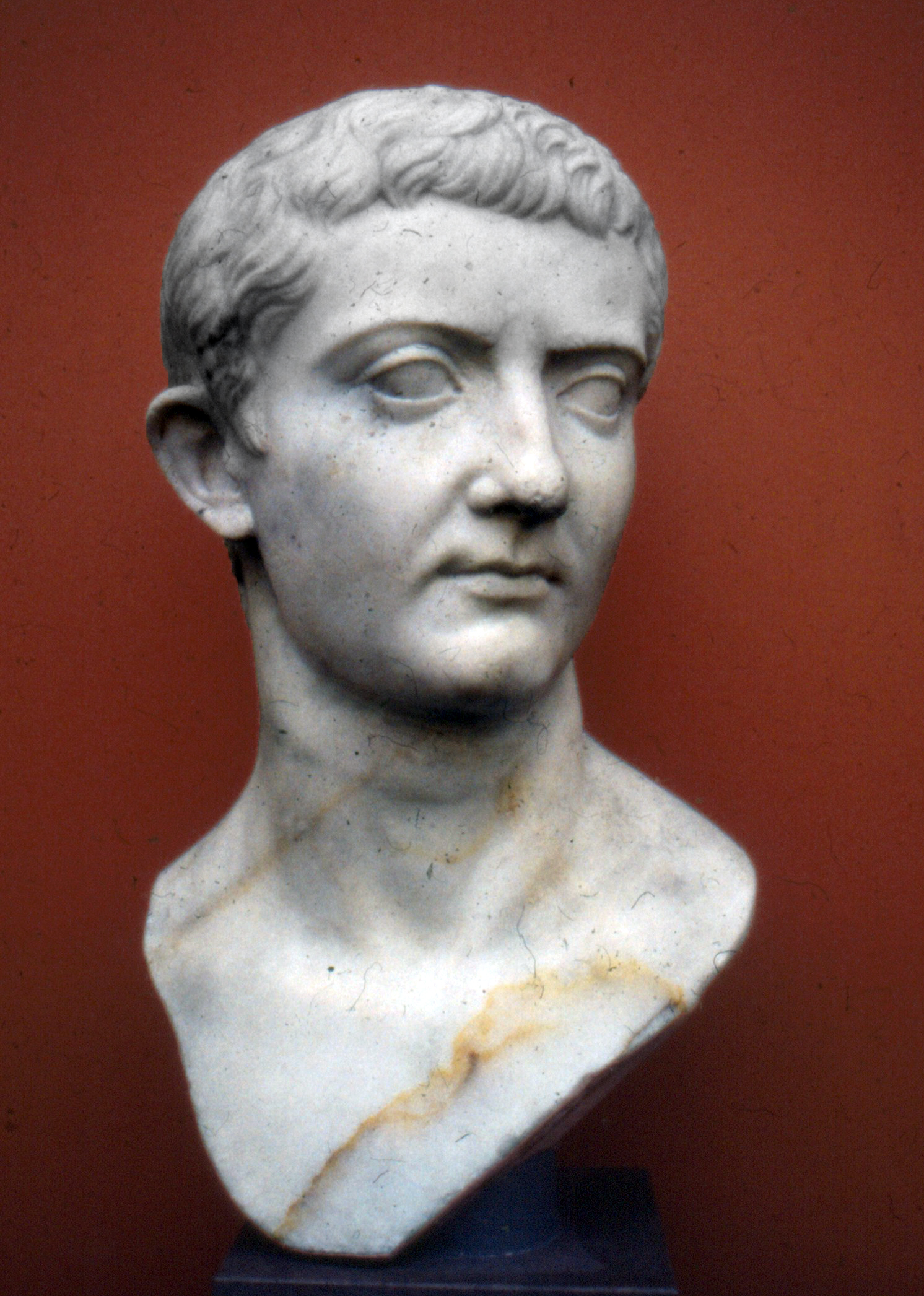
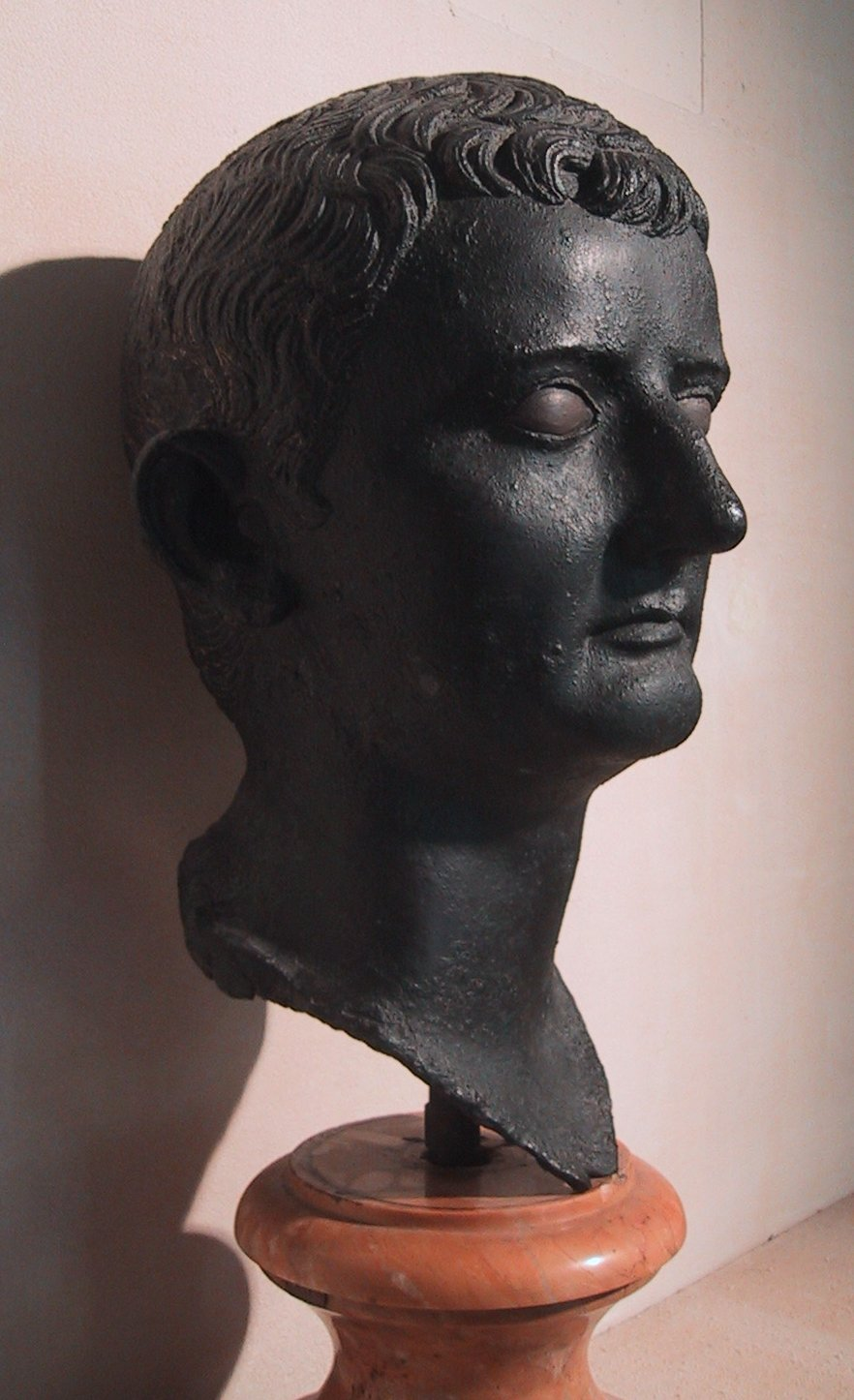
Left: marble portrait bust of Tiberius in the Ny Carlsberg Glyptotek
Right: bronze portrait bust of Tiberius in the BnF Museum

The death of Drusus elevated Sejanus, at least in the eyes of Tiberius, who thereafter refers to him as his Socius Laborum (Partner of my labours). Tiberius had statues of Sejanus erected throughout the city, and Sejanus became more and more visible as Tiberius began to withdraw from Rome altogether. Eventually, with Tiberius's withdrawal in AD 26, Sejanus was left in charge of the entire state mechanism and the city of Rome.

Sejanus's position was not quite that of successor; he had requested marriage in AD 25 to Tiberius's niece, Livilla, though under pressure quickly withdrew the request. While Sejanus's Praetorians controlled the imperial postal service, and therefore the information that Tiberius received from Rome and the information Rome received from Tiberius, Livia may have checked Sejanus' overt powers, until her death in AD 29.

Sejanus began a series of purge trials of Senators and wealthy equestrians (such as Curtius Atticus) in the city of Rome, removing those capable of opposing his power as well as extending the imperial (and his own) treasury. Germanicus's widow Agrippina the Elder and two of her sons, Nero Julius Caesar and Drusus Caesar, were arrested and exiled in AD 30 and later all died in suspicious circumstances. In Sejanus's purge of Agrippina the Elder and her family, Caligula, Agrippina the Younger, Julia Drusilla, and Julia Livilla were the only survivors.

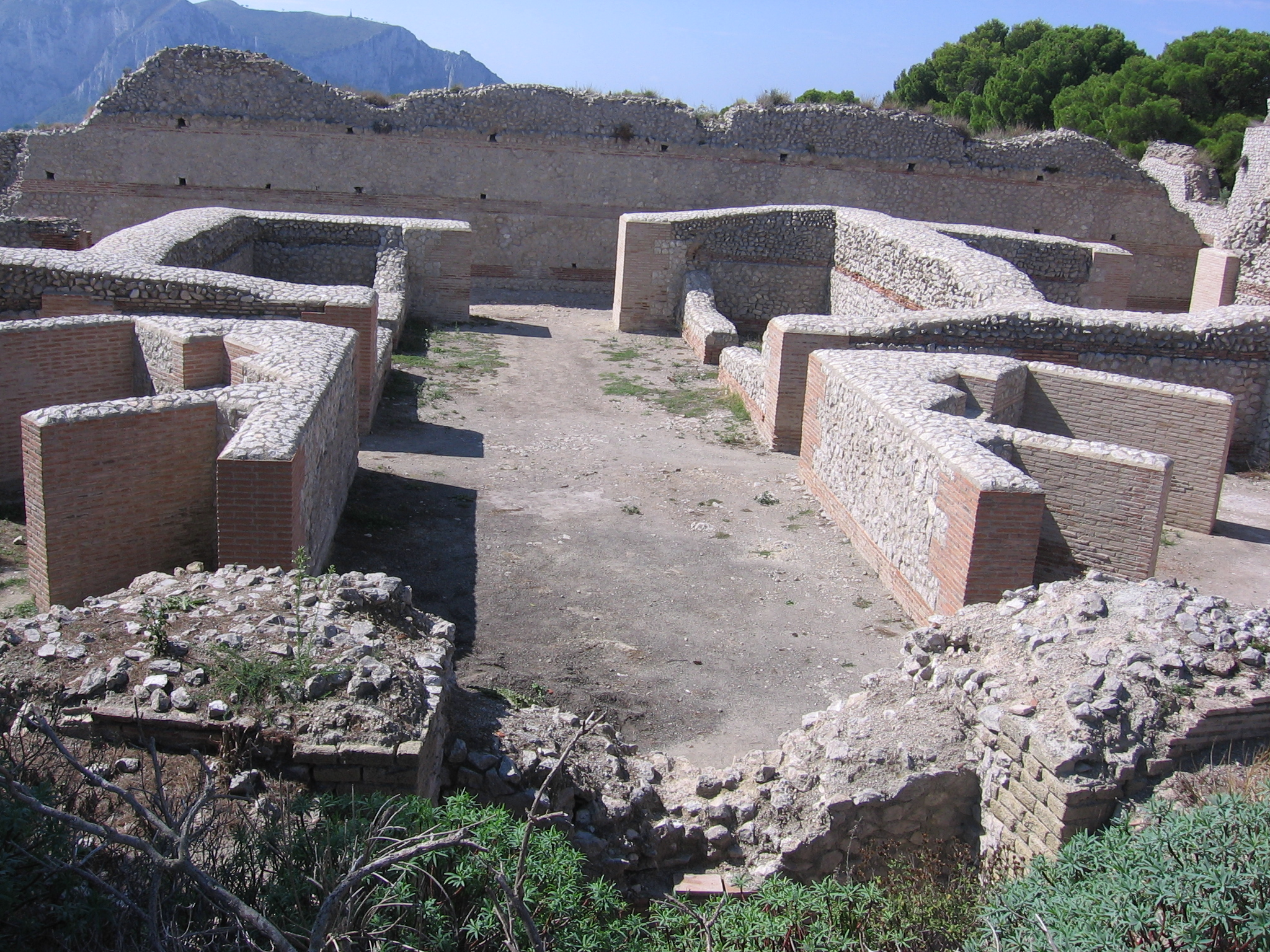
Ruins from the Villa Jovis on the island of Capri, where Tiberius spent much of his final years, leaving control of the empire in the hands of the prefect Lucius Aelius Sejanus.

In 31, Sejanus held the consulship with Tiberius in absentia, and began his play for power in earnest. Precisely what happened is difficult to determine, but Sejanus seems to have covertly attempted to court those families who were tied to the Julians and attempted to ingratiate himself with the Julian family line to place himself, as an adopted Julian, in the position of Princeps, or as a possible regent. Livilla was later implicated in this plot and was revealed to have been Sejanus's lover for several years.

The plot seems to have involved the two of them overthrowing Tiberius, with the support of the Julians, and either assuming the Principate themselves, or serving as regent to the young Tiberius Gemellus or possibly even Caligula. Those who stood in his way were tried for treason and swiftly dealt with.

In AD 31 Sejanus was summoned to a meeting of the Senate, where a letter from Tiberius was read condemning Sejanus and ordering his immediate execution. Sejanus was tried, and he and several of his colleagues were executed within the week. As commander of the Praetorian Guard, he was replaced by Naevius Sutorius Macro.

Tacitus claims that more treason trials followed and that whereas Tiberius had been hesitant to act at the outset of his reign, now, towards the end of his life, he seemed to do so without compunction. The hardest hit were those families with political ties to the Julians. Even the imperial magistracy was hit, as any and all who had associated with Sejanus or could in some way be tied to his schemes were summarily tried and executed, their properties seized by the state. According to Tacitus;

Executions were now a stimulus to his fury, and he ordered the death of all who were lying in prison under accusation of complicity with Sejanus. There lay, singly or in heaps, the unnumbered dead, of every age and sex, the illustrious with the obscure. Kinsfolk and friends were not allowed to be near them, to weep over them, or even to gaze on them too long. Spies were set round them, who noted the sorrow of each mourner and followed the rotting corpses, till they were dragged to the Tiber, where, floating or driven on the bank, no one dared to burn or to touch them.

Tacitus's extravagant portrayal of a tyrannical, vengeful emperor has been challenged by some historians: Edward Togo Salmon notes in A History of the Roman World:

In the whole twenty two years of Tiberius's reign, not more than fifty-two persons were accused of treason, of whom almost half escaped conviction, while the four innocent people to be condemned fell victims to the excessive zeal of the Senate, not to the emperor's tyranny.

While Tiberius was in Capri, rumours abounded as to what exactly he was doing there. Suetonius records the rumours of lurid tales of sexual perversity, including graphic depictions of child molestation, cruelty, and most of all his paranoia. While heavily sensationalised, Suetonius's stories at least paint a picture of how Tiberius was perceived by the Roman senatorial class, and what his impact on the Principate was during his 23 years of rule.

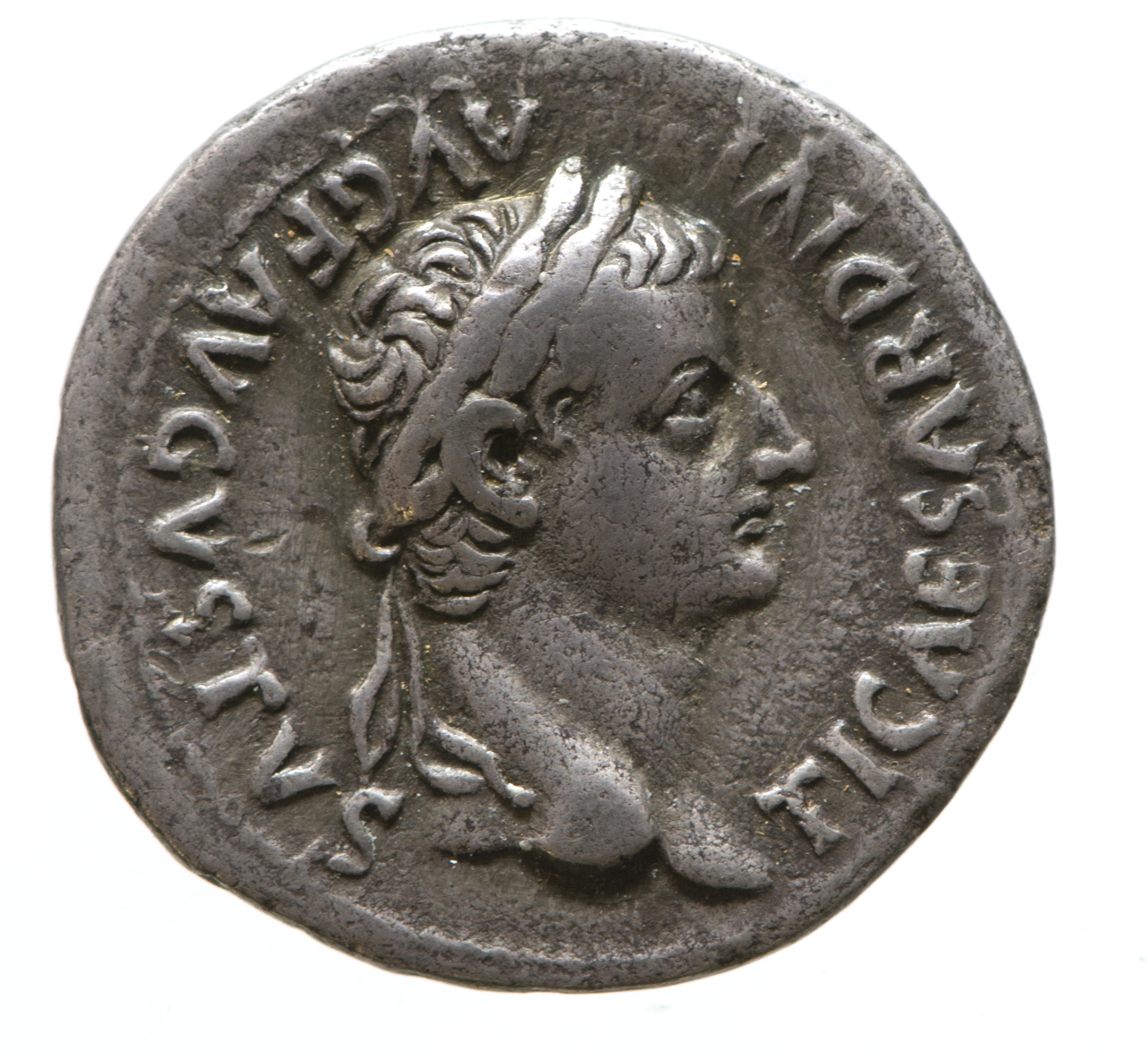
A denarius of Tiberius. Caption: TI. CAESAR DIVI AVG. F. AVGVSTVS

=== Final years ===
The affair of Sejanus and the final years of treason trials permanently damaged Tiberius's image and reputation. After Sejanus's fall, Tiberius's withdrawal from Rome was complete; the empire continued to run under the inertia of the bureaucracy established by Augustus, rather than through the leadership of the Princeps. Suetonius records that he became paranoid, and spent a great deal of time brooding over the death of his son. During this period there was a short invasion by Parthia, and incursions on Roman territories by Dacian and Germanic tribes.

Little was done to plan or secure Tiberius's succession. The Julians and their supporters were diminished in numbers and political influence, thanks to Sejanus, and Tiberius's immediate heirs were dead. Caligula, the sole surviving son of Germanicus, or Tiberius's own grandson, Tiberius Gemellus, were possibly candidates. However, Tiberius only made a half-hearted attempt at the end of his life to make Caligula a quaestor, and thus give him some credibility as a possible successor, while Gemellus himself was still only a teenager and thus completely unsuitable for some years to come.

=== Death ===
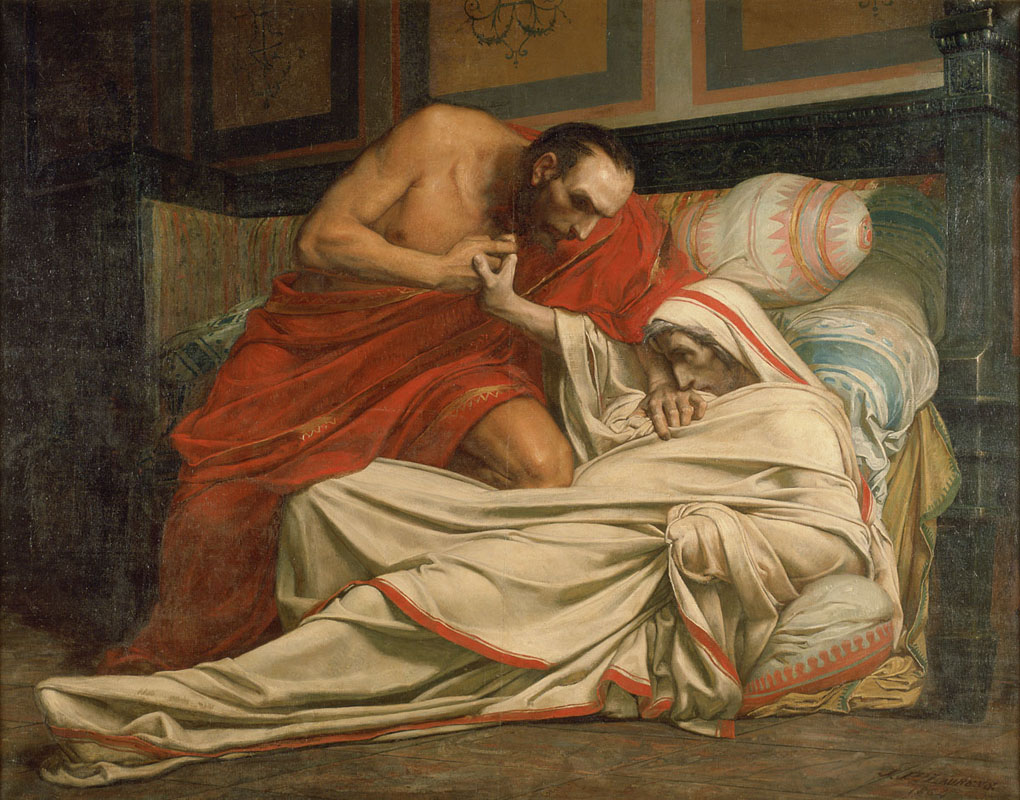
The Death of Tiberius by Jean-Paul Laurens, 1864

Tiberius died in Misenum on 16 March AD 37, months before his 78th birthday. While ancient sources agree on the date and location of his death, contradictory accounts exist of the precise circumstances.

Tacitus relates that the emperor appeared to have stopped breathing, and that Caligula, who was at Tiberius's villa, was being congratulated on his succession to the empire, when news arrived that the emperor had revived and was recovering his faculties. He goes on to report that those who had moments before recognised Caligula as Augustus fled in fear of the emperor's wrath, while Macro took advantage of the chaos to have Tiberius smothered with his own bedclothes.

Suetonius reports that, upon recovering after an illness, and finding himself deserted by his attendants, Tiberius attempted to rise from his couch, but fell dead. Suetonius further reports several rumours, including that the emperor had been poisoned by Caligula, starved, and smothered with a pillow. Seneca the Elder also reports Tiberius having died a natural death.

According to Cassius Dio, Caligula, fearing that the emperor would recover, refused Tiberius's requests for food, insisting that he needed warmth, not food; then, assisted by Macro, he smothered the emperor in his bedclothes. (Note: Dio states that Tiberius died on the "twenty-sixth day of March. He had lived seventy-seven years, four months, and nine days, of which time he had been emperor twenty-two years, seven months, and seven days." Dio's calculations are accurate, but the number "26" is a mistake for "16".) (Note: Josephus states that "Tiberius died, after he had reigned twenty-two years, six months, and three days." Tiberius actually ruled 22 years, 6 months, and 25 days reckoning from Augustus's death.) Neither Josephus, Pliny, nor Philo relate the story of Tiberius's suffocation, stating simply the date of his death and/or the length of his reign.

After his death, the Senate refused to vote Tiberius the divine honours that had been paid to Augustus, and mobs filled the streets yelling "To the Tiber with Tiberius!" (the bodies of criminals were typically thrown into the river, instead of being buried or burnt). However, the emperor was cremated, and his ashes were placed in the Mausoleum of Augustus.

In his will, Tiberius nominated Caligula and Tiberius Gemellus as his joint heirs. Caligula's first act on becoming Princeps was to void Tiberius's will.

== Health and physical appearance ==
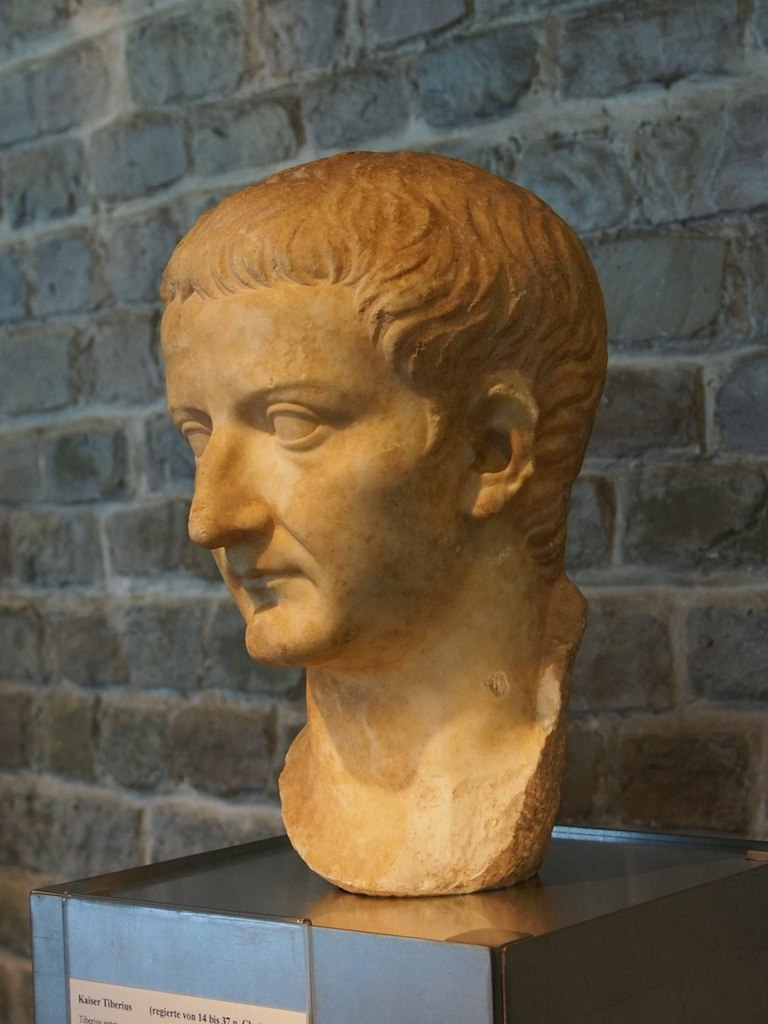
Bust of Tiberius, AD 14–37

Suetonius describes Tiberius as being pale-skinned, broad-shouldered, left-handed, and exceptionally strong and tall for a Roman, although he had poor posture. (Note: At the time Suetonius was writing, the average Roman man would have been about five foot six.) Suetonius and Paterculus write that he was beautiful in his youth. Even in adulthood, he was prone to severe acne outbreaks. He wore his hair cut short at the front and sides but long in the back so it covered the nape of his neck in a style similar to the mullet, which Suetonius claims was a family tradition of the Claudian gens. This assertion is confirmed by busts of other Claudian men, who were depicted with the same hairstyle. Suetonius describes his eyes as being larger than average, while a passage in Pliny indicates they were grey or blue-grey; polychromy restoration on a bust of Tiberius depict him with grey eyes and hair. Suetonius reports he tended to talk with his hands, a habit others found unnerving, and which Augustus saw as an inherent character flaw.

Cassius Dio and Tacitus record that by the time he became Emperor, Tiberius had gone bald. Tacitus further reports that the Emperor had lost most of his body fat and become abnormally thin, although he retained his physical strength. He contracted a disfiguring facial ailment which may have been a severe case of herpes, an outbreak of which affected the Empire during his reign; Tiberius banned kissing at public functions in an effort to curtail its spread. Tacitus believed that embarrassment over his baldness and the disfigurement of his face may contributed to his retreat to Capri. Despite this, Suetonius reports that Tiberius enjoyed good health for the duration of his reign. Late in life he suffered from a poor pulse, which modern scholars believe may have been a sign of heart disease. Shortly before his death, he suffered an injury to his back while killing a boar with a javelin to open soldiers' games, which severely limited his mobility in his final days.

== Legacy ==
=== Historiography ===
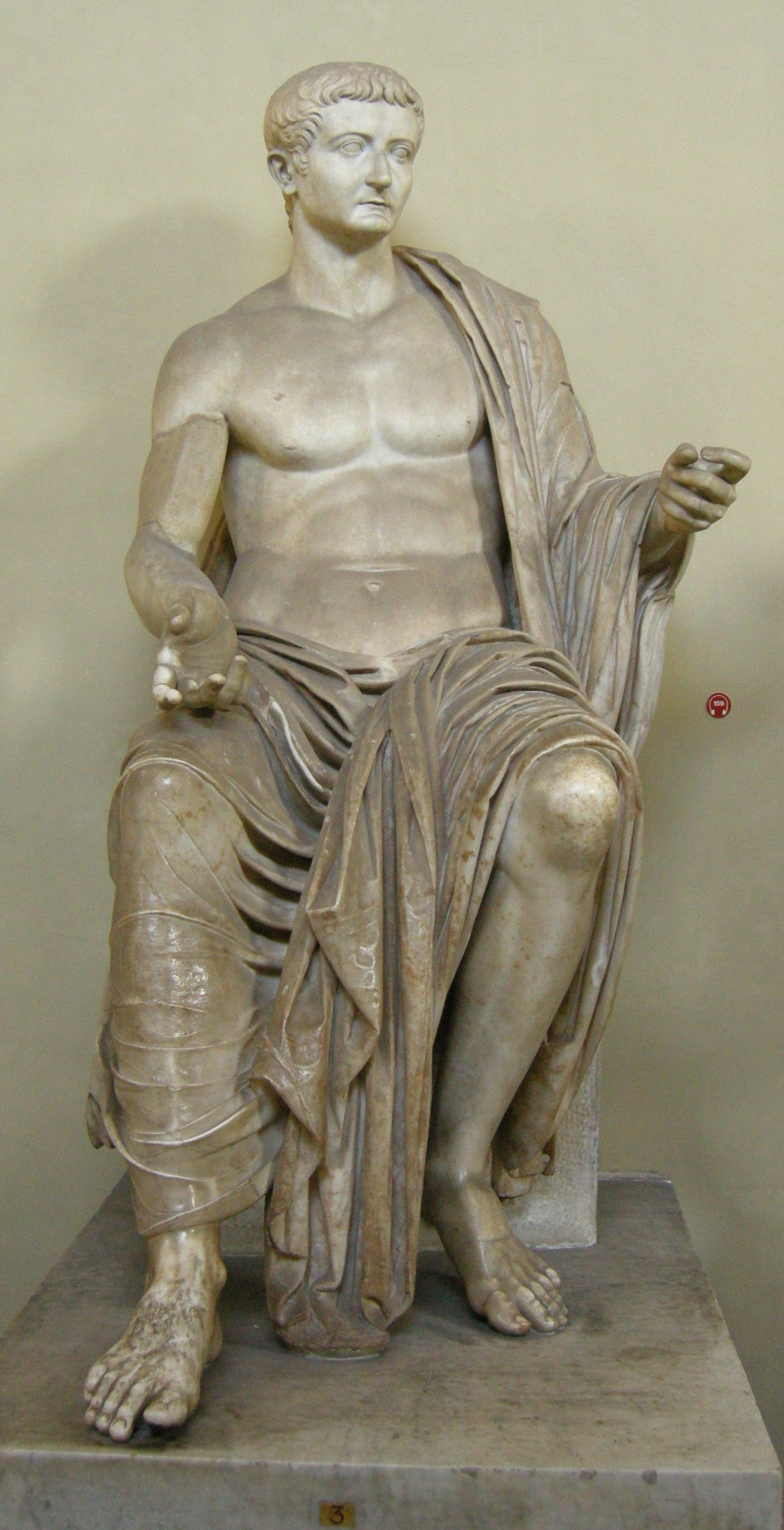
Statue of Tiberius from Priverno, made shortly after AD 37. Museo Chiaramonti

Had he died before AD 23, he might have been hailed as an exemplary ruler. Despite the overwhelmingly negative characterisation left by Roman historians, Tiberius left the imperial treasury with nearly 3 billion sesterces upon his death. Rather than embark on costly campaigns of conquest, he chose to strengthen the existing empire by building additional bases, using diplomacy as well as military threats, and generally refraining from getting drawn into petty squabbles between competing frontier tyrants. The result was a stronger, more consolidated empire, ensuring the imperial institutions introduced by his adoptive father would remain for centuries to come.

Of the authors whose texts have survived, only four describe the reign of Tiberius in considerable detail: Tacitus, Suetonius, Cassius Dio and Marcus Velleius Paterculus. Fragmentary evidence also remains from Pliny the Elder, Strabo and Seneca the Elder. Philo of Alexandria speaks briefly of Tiberius's reign in Embassy to Gaius. Tiberius himself wrote an autobiography which Suetonius describes as "brief and sketchy", but this book has been lost.

==== Publius Cornelius Tacitus ====
The most detailed account of this period was written by Tacitus, whose Annals dedicate the first six books entirely to the reign of Tiberius. Tacitus was a Roman senator, born during the reign of Nero in AD 56, and consul suffectus in AD 97. His text is largely based on the Acta Senatus (the minutes of the session of the Senate) and the Acta Diurna (a collection of the acts of the government and news of the court and capital), as well as speeches by Tiberius himself, and the histories of contemporaries such as Marcus Cluvius Rufus, Fabius Rusticus and Pliny the Elder (all of which are lost). Tacitus's narrative emphasises both political and psychological motivation. His characterisation of Tiberius throughout the first six books is mostly negative, and gradually worsens as his rule declines, identifying a clear breaking point with the death of his son Drusus in AD 23.

Tacitus describes Julio-Claudian rule as generally unjust and "criminal"; he attributes the apparent virtues of Tiberius during his early reign to hypocrisy. Another major recurring theme concerns the balance of power between the Senate and the emperors, corruption, and the growing tyranny among the governing classes of Rome. A substantial amount of his account on Tiberius is therefore devoted to the treason trials and persecutions following the revival of the maiestas law under Augustus. Ultimately, Tacitus's opinion on Tiberius is best illustrated by his conclusion of the sixth book:

His character too had its distinct periods. It was a bright time in his life and reputation, while under Augustus he was a private citizen or held high offices; a time of reserve and crafty assumption of virtue, as long as Germanicus and Drusus were alive. Again, while his mother lived, he was a compound of good and evil; he was infamous for his cruelty, though he veiled his debaucheries, while he loved or feared Sejanus. Finally, he plunged into every wickedness and disgrace, when fear and shame being cast off, he simply indulged his own inclinations.

==== Suetonius Tranquillus ====
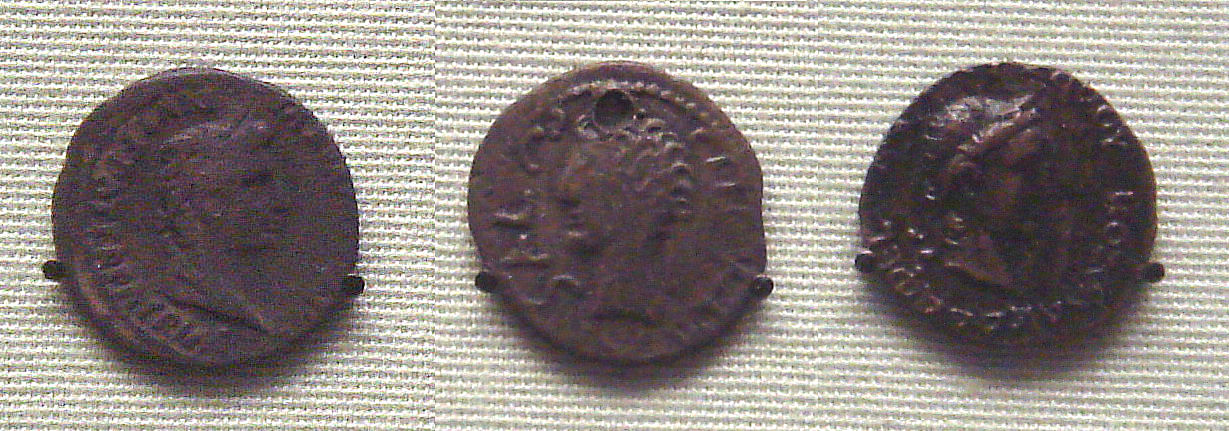
An example of Indo-Roman trade and relations during the period: silver denarius of Tiberius (14–37) found in India and Indian copy of the same, 1st-century coin of Kushan king Kujula Kadphises copying a coin of Augustus.

Suetonius was an equestrian who held administrative posts during the reigns of Trajan and Hadrian. The Twelve Caesars details a biographical history of the principate from the birth of Julius Caesar to the death of Domitian in AD 96. Like Tacitus, he drew upon the imperial archives, as well as histories by Aufidius Bassus, Marcus Cluvius Rufus, Fabius Rusticus and Augustus's own letters.

His account is more sensationalist and anecdotal than that of his contemporary Tacitus, and delves into Tiberius's numerous alleged debaucheries while at Capri. Nevertheless, Suetonius praises Tiberius's actions during his early reign, emphasising his modesty.

==== Velleius Paterculus ====
One of the few surviving sources contemporary with the rule of Tiberius comes from Velleius Paterculus, who served under Tiberius for eight years (from AD 4) in Germany and Pannonia as praefect of cavalry and legatus. Paterculus' Compendium of Roman History spans a period from the fall of Troy to the death of Livia in AD 29. His text on Tiberius lavishes praise on both the emperor and Sejanus. How much of this is due to genuine admiration or prudence remains an open question, but it has been conjectured that he was put to death in AD 31 as a friend of Sejanus.

=== Gospels, Jews, and Christians ===
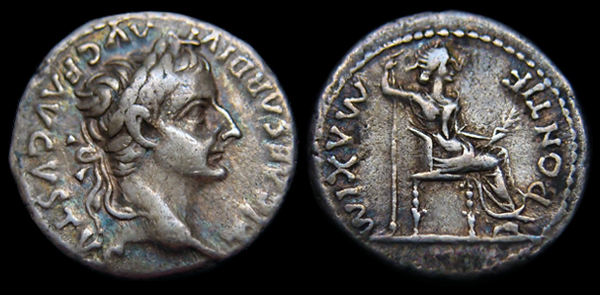
The tribute penny mentioned in the Bible is commonly believed to be a Roman denarius depicting the emperor Tiberius. Caption: TI. CAESAR DIVI AVG. F. AVGVSTVS / MAXIM. PONTIF.

According to the Gospels, Jesus of Nazareth preached and was executed during the reign of Tiberius, by the authority of Pontius Pilate, the Roman governor of Judaea province. Luke 3:1, states that John the Baptist entered on his public ministry in the fifteenth year of Tiberius's reign. The city of Tiberias, on the Western shore of the Sea of Galilee (also known as the Sea of Tiberias) was named thus by Herod Antipas in Tiberius's honour. It is referred to in John 6:23 and John 6:1. The so-called "tribute penny" referred to in the Gospel of Matthew and the Gospel of Mark is popularly thought to be a silver denarius coin of Tiberius.

During Tiberius's reign, Jews had become more prominent in Rome and Jewish and Gentile followers of Jesus began proselytising Roman citizens, increasing long-simmering resentments. In AD 19 Tiberius ordered Jews of military age to join the Roman Army. He banished the rest of Rome's Jewish population, on pain of enslavement for life. Josephus credits the banishment to a quartet of Jewish con artists – one of whom had fled prosecution in Judea for financial crimes – who successfully conspired to scam a Roman Matron out of a large quantity of money, silk, and gold, ostensibly to be sent for dedication in the Second Temple in Jerusalem.

There were no systematic Roman persecutions of Christians under Tiberius after Christ's crucifixion. Jossa finds it "unthinkable" that Tiberius was aware of Christianity as a faith separate from Judaism. Most scholars believe that Roman distinction between Jews and Christians began in the 40s, in Caligula's reign, and was complete by around AD 70 (the destruction of Jerusalem).

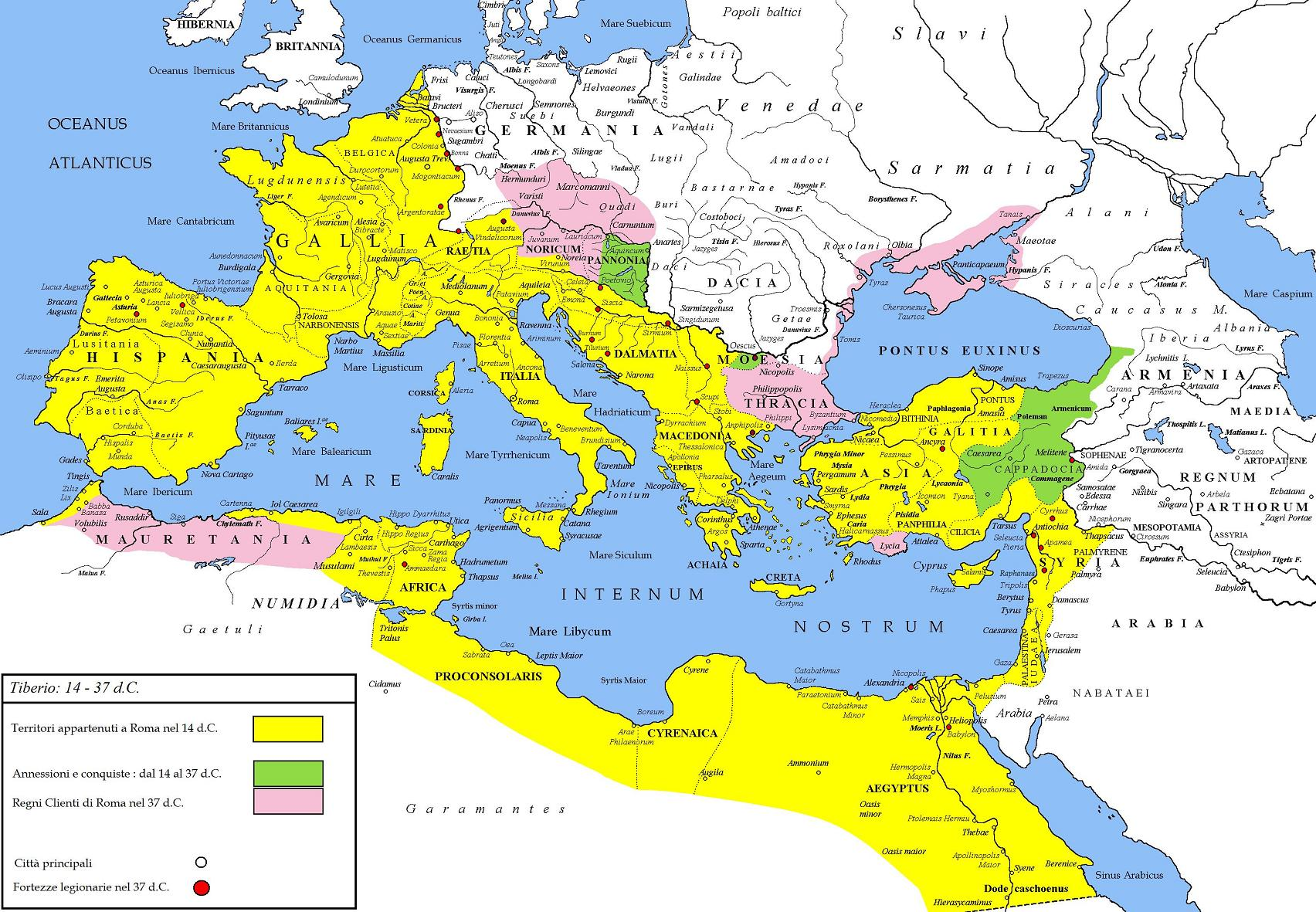
Extent of the Roman Empire under Tiberius

The early Christian Church's view of Tiberius has generally been favourable. The 2nd-3rd century Christian apologist Tertullian said Tiberius approached the Senate with a request to acknowledge Christ as a deity, citing evidence of his miracles, and his resurrection following his crucifixion. Early Church historian Eusebius said Pilate reported to Tiberius of the resurrection of Christ. Tiberius is said to have taken Pilate's report to the Senate. Tiberius had to be content with the protection of Christians from malicious prosecution by senators; St. Jerome adds that this was under the penalty of death. Both he and Eusebius included Tertullian's account in their respective histories of the Christian Church, but no evidence of such protection survives in Roman law. Crake describes the episode as essentially a comment on deification by decree of the senate", in which few "would take seriously even Tertullian's version of events" (Note: The 20th-century Canadian historian J.E.A. Crake (1911–1983) said in 1963 at an annual meeting of the Classical Association of Canada that few "would take seriously even Tertullian's version of events" and that its "combination of legal inconsistency would have inspired a couple of pages of sarcasm from Tertullian.") Translator G.A. Williamson said it "can be hardly doubted that Pilate sent such a report, but none of the extant versions is regarded as genuine". The Christian History Institute does not list Tiberius as a Roman emperor who persecuted Christians. (Note: According to the Christian History Institute from "AD 30 to AD 311, a period in which 54 emperors ruled the Empire, only about a dozen took the trouble to harass Christians. Furthermore, not until Decius (249–251) did any deliberately attempt an Empire-wide persecution. Until then, persecution came mainly at the instigation of local rulers, albeit with Rome's approval.")

=== Archaeology ===
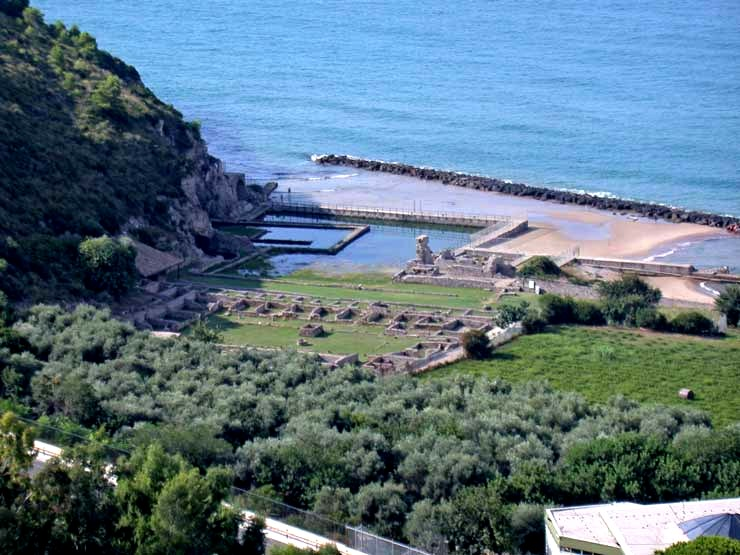
Remnants of Tiberius's villa at Sperlonga, on the coast midway between Rome and Naples

Possible traces remain of renovations by Tiberius in the Gardens of Maecenas, where he lived upon returning from exile in AD 2. These persist inside the villa's likely triclinium-nymphaeum, the so-called Auditorium of Maecenas. In an otherwise Late Republican-era building, identifiable as such by its brickwork and flooring, the Dionysian-themed landscape and nature frescoes lining the walls are reminiscent of the illusionistic early Imperial paintings in his mother's own subterranean dining room.

Tiberius's palace in Rome was on the Palatine Hill; its ruins still stand. Tiberius built a temple in Rome to the deified Augustus, and restored the theatre of Pompey, these works were not finished until the reign of Caligula. The construction of the Castrum Pretorium in 21-23 CE consolidated the previous cohorts of the Praetorian Guard into one permanent barracks just outside of the city limits. The remains of Tiberius's villa at Sperlonga include a grotto, where the fragmentary Sperlonga sculptures were found. The hill-top Villa Jovis retreat at Capri has been preserved. The estate at Capri is said by Tacitus to have included a total of twelve villas, of which the Villa Jovis was the largest.

Tiberius refused to be officially worshipped as a living god. He promoted restraint in the official, empire-wide cult to the divinised Augustus, and established a priesthood, the Sodales Augustales, to administer its rites. He allowed a single temple to honour both his own genius and that of the Senate, at Smyrna.

=== Popular culture ===
Tiberius has been represented in literature, film, television, and video games, often as a peripheral character in the central storyline. This is a list of appearances he has made in popular culture:

- He appears in the 1934 novel I, Claudius by Robert Graves, and the consequent BBC television series adaptation, where he is portrayed by George Baker.
- George R. R. Martin, the author of A Song of Ice and Fire series, stated that central character Stannis Baratheon is partially inspired by Tiberius, and particularly the portrayal by Baker.
- In the 1968 ITV historical drama The Caesars, Tiberius is the central character for much of the series.
- He appears as a character in the 2006 film The Inquiry, in which he is played by Max von Sydow. Tiberius has prominent roles in Ben-Hur, and in A.D. (played by James Mason).
- He was featured in The Robe (1953), played by Ernest Thesiger.
- He was featured in the 1979 film Caligula, portrayed by Peter O'Toole.
- In the TV series Roman Empire, Tiberius was included. In the 2021 TV series Domina, he was played by Earl Cave.
- Arthur Machen's 1895 novel The Three Impostors includes a tale in which occultists search for an ancient coin commemorating a Roman orgy involving Tiberius.

== Marriages and issue ==
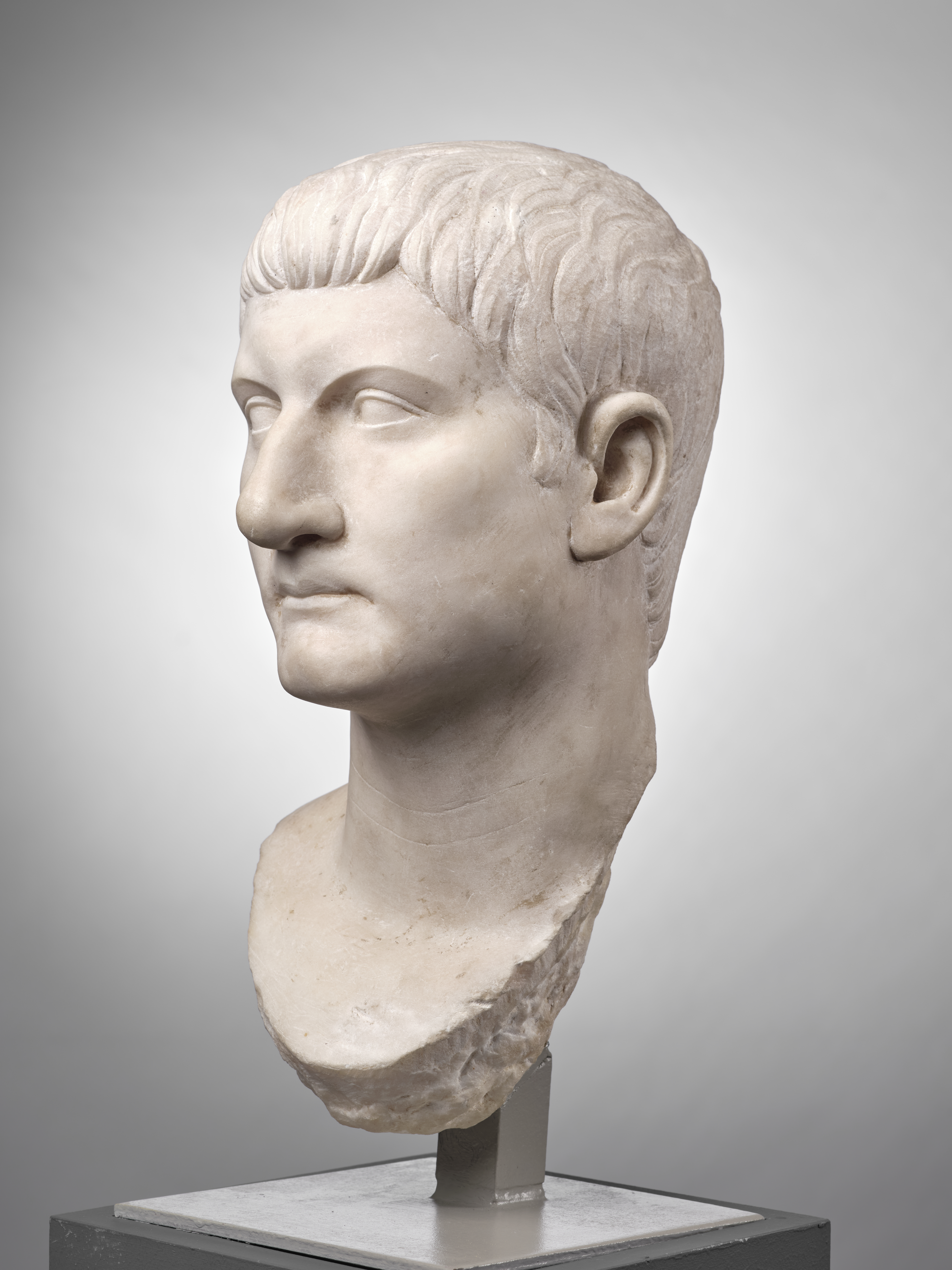
Bust of Drusus Julius Caesar

Tiberius married twice, first to the daughter of Agrippa, Vipsania Agrippina. His second marriage was after Agrippa's death to Augustus' daughter, Julia the Elder. Only his marriage with Agrippina produced a child who survived to adulthood, known as Drusus Julius Caesar (14 BC – AD 23). His marriage with Julia produced a child who died in infancy.

In AD 4, Tiberius adopted his nephew Germanicus Julius Caesar (15/16 BC – AD 19), the son of his brother Nero Claudius Drusus and Augustus's niece Antonia Minor.

== See also ==
- Caesar cut
- Clutorius Priscus
- Julio-Claudian family tree
- List of biblical figures identified in extra-biblical sources

== Bibliography ==
=== Primary sources ===
- Cassius Dio (1927) [c. 230]. "Book 55–58". Roman History. Translated by Earnest Cary. Loeb Classical Library.
- Josephus (1737) [c. 96 AD]. "Chapters XVIII". Antiquities of the Jews. Translated by William Whiston. Harvard University Press.
- Gaius Plinius Secundus (1961) [c. 77 AD]. Natural History. Translated by H. Rackham; W.H.S. Jones; and D.E. Eichholz. Harvard University Press.
- Gaius Suetonius Tranquillus (1913) [c. AD 121]. "Life of Augustus". The Twelve Caesars. Translated by John Carew Rolfe. Loeb Classical Library.
- Gaius Suetonius Tranquillus (1913) [c. AD 121]. "Life of Tiberius". The Twelve Caesars. Translated by John Carew Rolfe. Loeb Classical Library.
- Gaius Suetonius Tranquillus (1913) [c. AD 121]. "Life of Caligula". The Twelve Caesars. Translated by John Carew Rolfe. Loeb Classical Library.
- Publius Cornelius Tacitus (1924) [c. AD 110]. The Annals. Translated by Frederick W. Shipley. Loeb Classical Library.
- Marcus Velleius Paterculus (1924) [c. AD 30]. "Book II". The Roman History. Translated by Frederick W. Shipley. Loeb Classical Library.

=== Secondary material ===
- Balsdon, J V P D; Levick, Barbara. "Tiberius, Roman emperor". In OCD^{4} (2012).
- Capes, William Wolfe (1897). Roman History: The Early Empire. Epochs of Ancient History. London: Longmans, Green, and Co.
- Hornblower, Simon; et al., eds. (2012). The Oxford classical dictionary (4th ed.). Oxford University Press. ISBN 978-0-19-954556-8. OCLC 959667246.
- Levick, Barbara (1999) [First ed. 1976]. Tiberius the Politician (Revised ed.). London: Routledge. ISBN 0-415-21753-9.
- Mattingly, Harold (1971) [1st pub. 1957]. Roman Imperial Civilization. New York: W W Norton & Company Inc. ISBN 0-393-00572-0.
- Seager, Robin (2005) [1972]. Tiberius (2nd ed.). Oxford: Blackwell Publishing. ISBN 1-4051-1528-9.
- Shotter, David (2004) [1992]. Tiberius Caesar (2nd ed.). London: Routledge. ISBN 0-415-31946-3.
- Southern, Pat (1998). Augustus. London: Routledge. ISBN 0-415-16631-4.
- Williamson, G. A. (1965). The History of the Church Eusebius. Dorset Press. ISBN 0-14-044-138-7.
- Zmeskal, Klaus (2009). Adfinitas (in German). Vol. 1. Passau: Verlag Karl Stutz. ISBN 978-3-88849-304-1.

Tiberius Julio-Claudian dynasty Born: 16 November 42 BC Died: 16 March AD 37
Preceded by Augustus	Roman emperor AD 14–37	Succeeded by Caligula
Political offices
Preceded by M. Licinius Crassus; Gn. Cornelius Lentulus Augur	Roman consul 13 BC; With: P. Quinctilius Varus	Succeeded by M. Valerius Messalla Appianus; P. Sulpicius Quirinius
Preceded by G. Marcius Censorinus; G. Asinius Gallus	Roman consul II; 7 BC; With: Gn. Calpurnius Piso	Succeeded by D. Laelius Balbus; G. Antistius Vetus
Preceded by G. Vibius Marsus; L. Voluseius Proculus	Roman consul III; AD 18; With: Germanicus Julius Caesar	Succeeded by L. Seius Tubero; M. Livineius Regulus
Preceded by M. Valerius Messala Barbatus; M. Aurelius Cotta Maximus Messalinus	Roman consul IV; AD 21; With: Drusus Julius Caesar	Succeeded by D. Haterius Agrippa; G. Sulpicius Galba
Preceded by L. Naevius Surdinus; G. Cassius Longinus	Roman consul V AD 31; With: L. Aelius Sejanus	Succeeded by Gn. Domitius Ahenobarbus; L. Arruntius Camillus Scribonianus
