= Gnaeus Domitius Ahenobarbus (father of Nero) =

Roman politician (2 BC – AD 40)

- consul (AD 32)
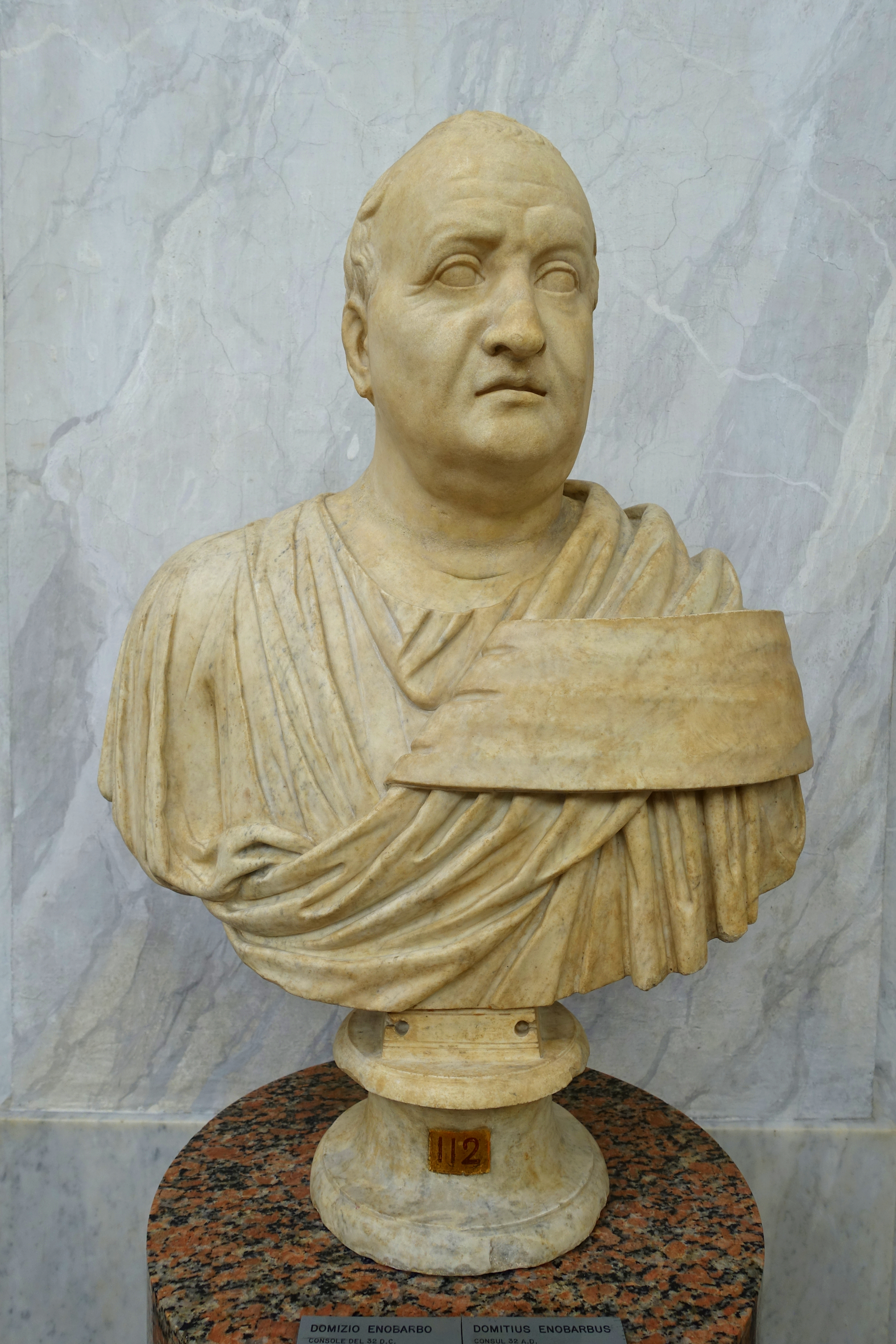
- Bust of Gnaeus Domitius Ahenobarbus
- Born: c. 2 BC; Rome, Italy, Roman Empire
- Died: c. 40 AD; Pyrgi, Italy, Roman Empire
- Spouse: Agrippina the Younger
- Issue: Nero
- Dynasty: Julio-Claudian
- Father: Lucius Domitius Ahenobarbus
- Mother: Antonia Major

Gnaeus Domitius Ahenobarbus (c. 2 BC – c. 40 AD) was a member of the imperial Julio-Claudian dynasty of Ancient Rome. Domitius was the son of Antonia Major (daughter of emperor Augustus' sister Octavia Minor and her second husband Mark Antony). He married Agrippina the Younger and became the father of the emperor Nero.

== Biography ==
=== Early life ===
Domitius' birthdate is uncertain; some hypotheses suggest that he was born around 17 BC while other sources argue he was born a generation later in 2 BC. Domitius was the son of Antonia Major, the niece of emperor Augustus, and her husband Lucius Domitius Ahenobarbus. He had at least two sisters Domitia and Domitia Lepida, and possibly an older brother named Lucius Domitius Ahenobarbus, whom ancient sources confuse his early career and birthdate with.

=== Career ===
Describing him as "a man loathsome in every respect", Suetonius says that as a young man, Domitius was serving on the staff of his second cousin Gaius Caesar in the east, in AD 2. Domitius killed his freedman for refusing to drink as much as he was told. The reported reason was that the freedman did not get as drunk as Domitius did. On the Appian Way, Domitius was reported to have deliberately run over a child who was playing with his doll. At the Roman Forum, Domitius reportedly pulled out an eye of an equestrian because the equestrian openly criticized him. Although some historians such as Ronald Syme have argued that the Domitius who served with Gaius Caesar may have been an older brother of Domitus and not Nero's father. Gaius Stern claims that the Eastern expedition is actually that of Germanicus in AD 17–19, if one assumes his birth to be in 2 BC, and still interprets the violent actions to belong to Nero's father.

Domitius cheated on bankers for purchases he made. When he was praetor, Domitius would swindle the prize money of victorious charioteers. Managers would complain, but Domitius decreed that future prizes would be paid on the spot. Domitius was also considered a serious womanizer. The emperor Tiberius charged him with treason, adultery and incest with his sister and also with adultery with another noblewoman, but the ascension of Caligula saved him.

Domitius married his first cousin once removed Agrippina the Younger, Caligula's sister, after her thirteenth birthday in AD 28. He was over twice her age at the time. Tiberius arranged and ordered the marriage, which was celebrated in Rome. Domitius was wealthy and he and Agrippina chose to live between Antium and Rome.

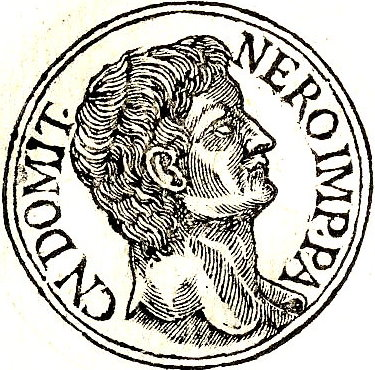
Gnaeus Domitius from Guillaume Rouillé's Promptuarium Iconum Insigniorum

Domitius was consul in AD 32 and appointed by Tiberius as a commissioner in early AD 37. His son Lucius Domitius Ahenobarbus, later Emporer Nero, was born on 15 December AD 37 in Antium. According to Suetonius, when Domitius was congratulated by his friends for the birth of his son he replied that any child born to him and Agrippina would have a detestable nature and become a public danger, a fact that became true during the second part of Nero's reign. When Nero castrated a boy named Sporus and married him as a wife, Suetonius quoted one contemporary Roman, who remarked that the world would have been better off if Nero's father had married someone more like the castrated boy.

He died of edema at Pyrgi (an ancient Etruscan city) at some date around 40 AD. In Domitius' will, Nero inherited one third of his estate, but Caligula, who was also mentioned in the will, took Nero's inheritance for himself. When Claudius became emperor, Nero's inheritance was restored.

== Legacy ==
During his lifetime, Domitius did not enjoy a good reputation. He was accused of being the accomplice of Albucilla in the crimes of adultery and murder, and also of incest with his sister Domitia Lepida, and narrowly escaped execution only because of the death of Tiberius.

His widow Agrippina later married her widowed uncle Claudius. Her son Lucius was adopted by the elderly Claudius and renamed Nero Claudius Caesar Drusus Germanicus. When Claudius died on 13 October AD 54, Nero succeeded him as Nero Claudius Caesar Augustus Germanicus. Nero exalted Domitius' memory, and the Roman Senate arranged for the construction of his statue in AD 55.

== See also ==
- List of Roman consuls

Political offices
Preceded by Publius Memmius Regulus, and Lucius Fulcinius Trio as Suffect consuls	Consul of the Roman Empire; AD 32 with Lucius Arruntius Camillus Scribonianus, followed by Aulus Vitellius	Succeeded by Galba, and Lucius Cornelius Sulla Felix as Ordinary consuls
