= Acerronia gens =

Ancient Roman family

Funerary inscription of Acerronia Posilla, from Egnatia, first century

The gens Acerronia or Aceronia was a minor plebeian family at Rome during the late Republic and early Empire. The most distinguished member of the gens was Gnaeus Acerronius Proculus, consul in AD 37. A number of Acerronii are known from inscriptions.

== Origin ==
The nomen Acerronius belongs to a large class of surnames, largely of plebeian origin, typically formed from cognomina ending in -o. Chase does not list the name among the gentilicia of this class, or mention it among the gentes for which origins could be readily determined. Those Accerronii not found at Rome are chiefly located in southern Italy. The consul Gnaeus Acerronius Proculus was originally from Lucania, although Cicero mentions someone of this name living at Rome at least a century earlier. An excavated sanctuary building from Regium Julium in Bruttium, and dating from the first century BC, includes a fragment of an architrave with a dedicatory inscription to Mefitis. Archaeologists believe that the family was behind the building activity and identified Proculus or his grandfather as the person mentioned in the inscription.

== Praenomina ==
The Acerronii used a variety of common praenomina, including Aulus, Gaius, Gaeus, and Marcus, as well as the less-common Numerius, a name typical of families from central and southern Italy. An inscription from Narbo in Gallia Narbonensis might mention a Lucius Acerronius, but the reading of the nomen gentilicium is uncertain.

== Branches and cognomina ==
Two cognomina are associated with the Acerronii mentioned in history: Proculus, originally a praenomen, was a common surname in imperial times. Polla, the feminine form of Paullus, was probably a personal name, although by imperial times women's individualizing names were usually treated as cognomina, despite functioning as the praenomina from which they were frequently derived. Posilla, found in an inscription is also a personal cognomen of this type, and like Polla or Paulla bore the meaning of "little", typically a name for a younger daughter. Celer, meaning "swift", was a common surname throughout Roman history. Puteolanus, found in a sepulchral inscription, indicated that the bearer was originally from Puteoli in Campania, while Eleutheria, belonging to an Acerronia buried at Tarentum, as a Greek theophoric name was likely the name of a freedwoman.

== Members ==
- Marcus Aceronius, the master of Troilus, a slave mentioned in an inscription from Minturnae in Latium, dating from the first half of the first century BC.
- Gnaeus Acerronius, mentioned as a vir optimus by Cicero in his oration, Pro Tullio, BC 71.
- Aulus Aceronius, named in a first-century BC dedicatory inscription from Rome.
- Gnaeus Acerronius Proculus, consul in AD 37.
- Acerronia Polla, perhaps a daughter of Gnaeus Acerronius Proculus, was a friend of Agrippina the Younger, and drowned during the attempted assassination of Agrippina by her son, the emperor Nero, in AD 59.
- Acerronia Salviae l., a freedwoman buried at Cereatae Marianae in Latium, together with her husband, the freedman Gaius Mussius Hilarus, in a tomb dating from the first half of the first century.
- Acerronia Eleutheria, buried at Tarentum in Calabria, aged seventy-five, in a tomb dating from the first half of the first century.
- Gnaeus Acerronius Cn. [...], buried in a first-century tomb at Ferentinum in Latium, along with two women named Acerronia, and others.
- Acerronia Posilla, buried at Egnatia in Apulia, aged seventy-five, in a tomb dating from the first century.
- Acerronia, named in a sepulchral inscription from Locri in Bruttium, dating between the mid-first and early second century.
- Gaius Acerronius Fur[...], named in two inscriptions from Londinium in Britannia, dating from between the mid-first and late second century.
- Acerronia, dedicated a second-century tomb at Rome.

=== Undated Acerronii ===
- Acerronius Celer, dedicated a tomb at Potentia in Lucania to his son.
- Numerius Acerronius Puteolanus, named in a sepulchral inscription from Potentia.
- Pompeia Acerronia, buried in a family sepulchre at Nemausus in Gallia Narbonensis, along with her husband, Quintus Magius Zosimus, one of the Seviri Augustales, and their freedmen.

== See also ==
- List of Roman gentes

== Bibliography ==
- Marcus Tullius Cicero, Pro Tullio.
- Publius Cornelius Tacitus, Annales.
- Lucius Cassius Dio, Roman History.
- Dictionary of Greek and Roman Biography and Mythology, William Smith, ed., Little, Brown and Company, Boston (1849).
- Theodor Mommsen et alii, Corpus Inscriptionum Latinarum (The Body of Latin Inscriptions, abbreviated CIL), Berlin-Brandenburgische Akademie der Wissenschaften (1853–present).
- René Cagnat et alii, L'Année épigraphique (The Year in Epigraphy, abbreviated AE), Presses Universitaires de France (1888–present).
- George Davis Chase, "The Origin of Roman Praenomina", in Harvard Studies in Classical Philology, vol. VIII, pp. 103–184 (1897).
- Giuseppe Camodeca, "Ascesa al Senato e rapporti con i territori d'origine. Italia: regio I (Campania) e le regiones II e III" (Ascent to the Senate and Relations with Territories of Origin: Italy, Regio I (Campania) and Regios II and III), in Epigrafia e Ordine Senatorio, Rome, vol. 2, pp. 101–163 (1982).
- The Roman Inscriptions of Britain (abbreviated RIB), Oxford, (1990–present).
- Mika Kajava, Roman Female Praenomina: Studies in the Nomenclature of Roman Women, Acta Instituti Romani Finlandiae (1994).
- Ilaria Battiloro, The Archaeology of Lucanian Cult Places: Fourth Century BC to the Early Imperial Age, Routledge, Oxford (2017), ISBN 978-1-317-10311-0.
- Katrin Engfer, Die private Munifizenz der römischen Oberschicht in Mittel- und Süditalien. Eine Untersuchung lateinischer Inschriften unter dem Aspekt der Fürsorge (The Private Munificence of the Roman Upper Class in Central and Southern Italy: A Review of Latin Inscriptions Regarding Care), Wiesbaden (2017).
- Archivio Storico Pugliese (Apulian Historical Archive).
