= Gnaeus Acerronius Proculus =

Consul of the Roman Empire in 37 AD

Gnaeus Acerronius Proculus was a consul of the Roman Empire in 37 AD, with Gaius Petronius Pontius Nigrinus as his colleague; that was the year Tiberius died.

Proculus is possibly a descendant of the Cn. Acerronius whom Cicero mentions in his oration for Tullius, Pro Tullio, from 71 BC, as a vir optimus. He may also have been the father of Acerronia Polla, a friend of Agrippina the Younger, whom the emperor Nero had murdered in AD 59.

== See also ==
- Acerronia (gens)

Political offices
Preceded by Gaius Vettius Rufus, and Marcus Porcius Cato as Suffect consuls	Consul of the Roman Empire; 37 with Gaius Petronius Pontius Nigrinus	Succeeded by Gaius Caesar Augustus Germanicus, and Tiberius Claudius Nero Germanicus
