= Acerronia Polla =

Roman servant and friend of Agrippina the Younger

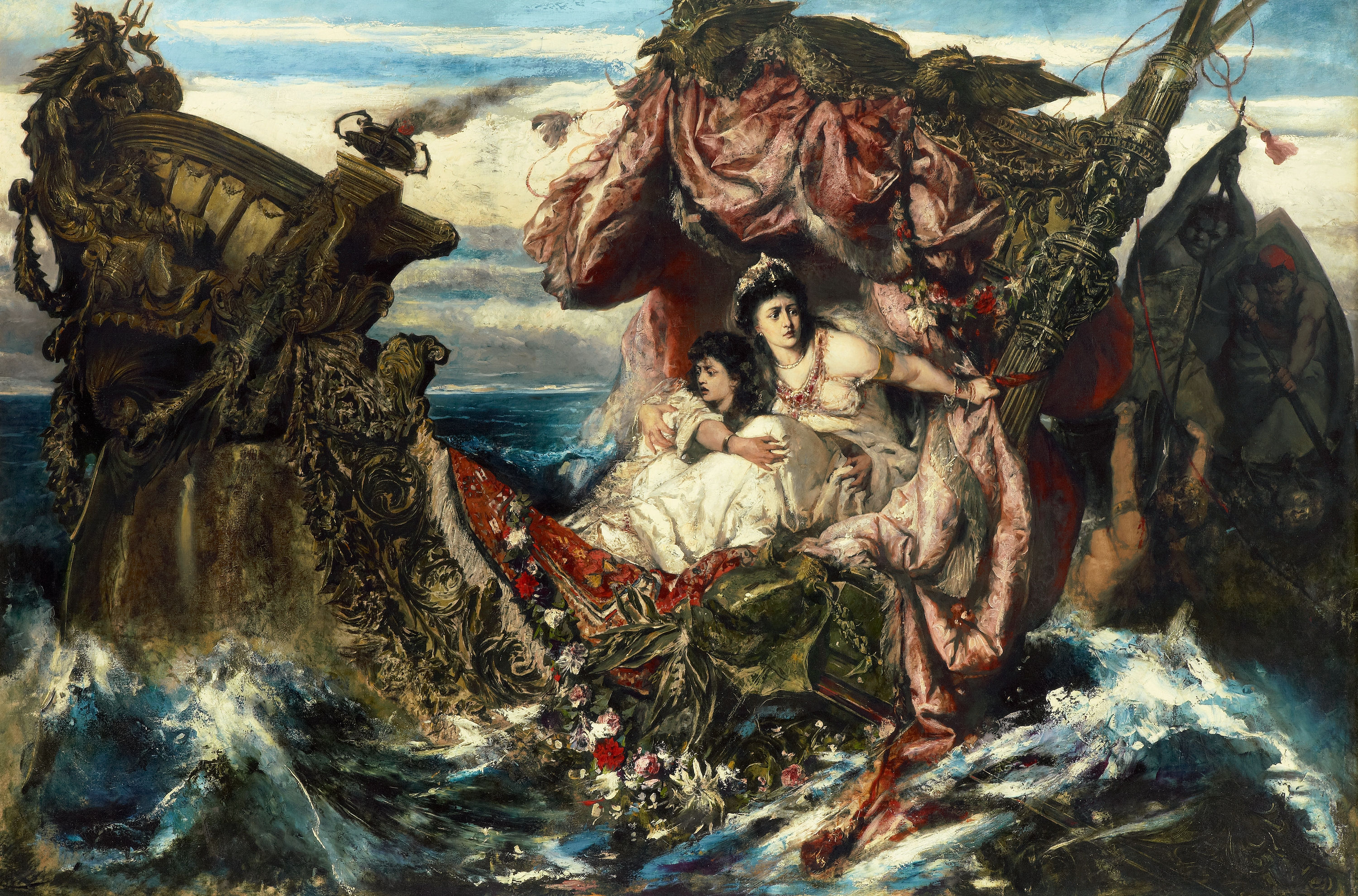
Der Schiffbruch der Agrippina, by Gustav Wertheimer, showing the drowning of Acerronia

Acerronia Polla was a servant and friend of Agrippina the Younger, the mother of Nero. She was drowned in AD 59, when an unsuccessful attempt was made at the same time to drown Agrippina. She may have been the daughter of Gnaeus Acerronius Proculus, consul in AD 37.

Tacitus' account indicates that Agrippina the Younger had set sail on a cruise on which Nero had secreted conspirators intent on killing her. Agrippina and Acerronia, along with the steersman Crepereius Gallus, were underneath a canopy on deck which had been secretly weighted with lead. At a given signal, the canopy fell, killing the steersman, but missing Agrippina and Acerronia because of the high-backed couch they had been sitting on.

There had been a mechanism designed to scuttle the ship, although it malfunctioned, and the conspirators failed in their further efforts to sink the craft. Meanwhile, Agrippina and Acerronia entered the water. Acerronia called out, claiming that she was Agrippina. The conspirators struck her with poles and oars until she had either been bludgeoned to death or drowned. Agrippina, wounded in the shoulder, managed to swim to a passing fishing boat.

The account of Cassius Dio is fundamentally the same, although he does indicate that the boat was in fact scuttled, and that Acerronia drowned. He also mentions nothing about Agrippina being rescued by a passing boat, and instead claims she swam all the way to shore on her own.
