= Julia Livilla =

Member of the Julio-Claudian dynasty (c. 18 – c. 41 AD)

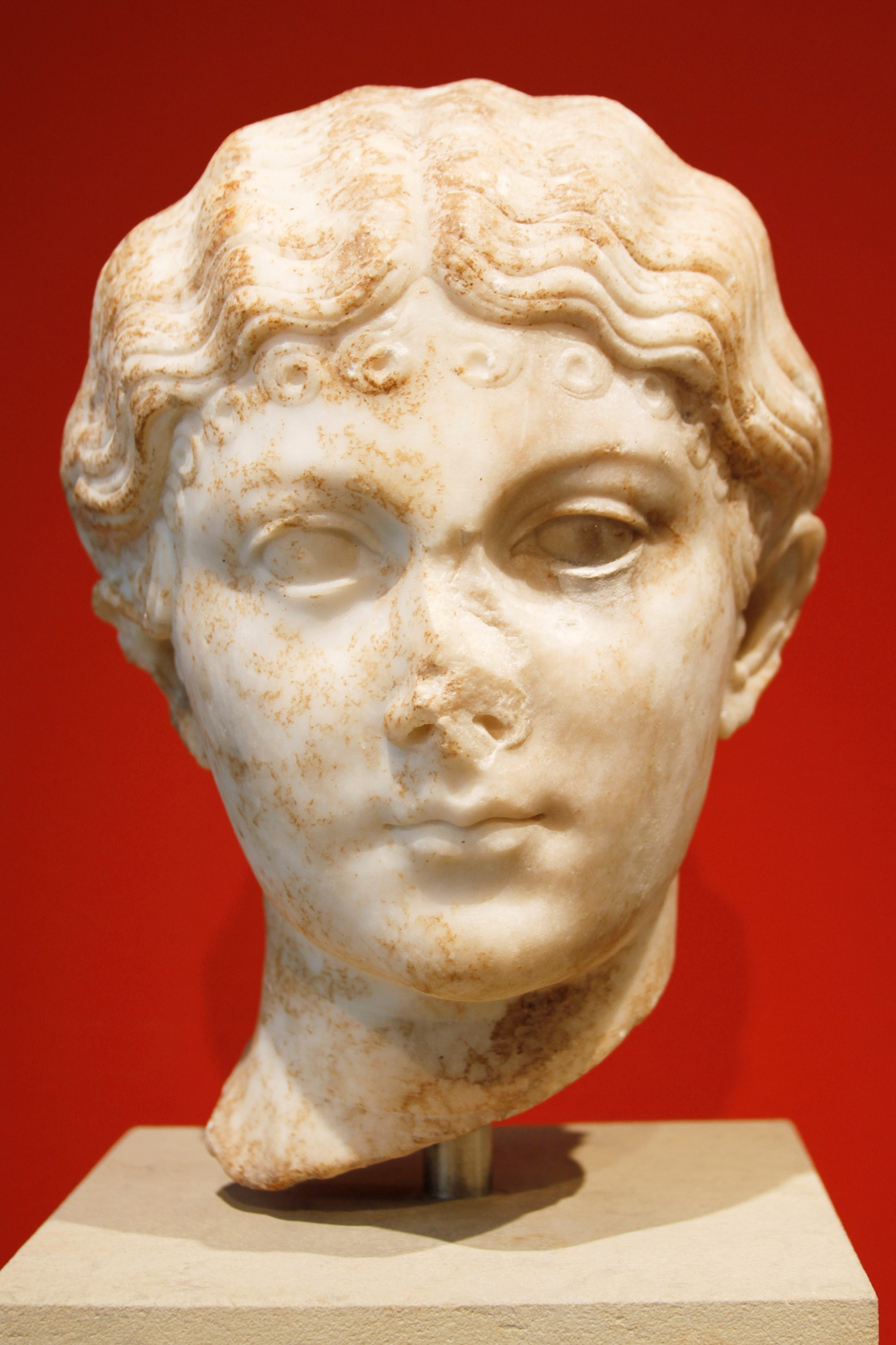
- Born: c. 18 AD; Lesbos, Greece
- Died: c. 41 (aged 22–23); Pandataria
- Burial: Mausoleum of Augustus
- Spouse: Marcus Vinicius
- Dynasty: Julio-Claudian
- Father: Germanicus
- Mother: Agrippina the Elder

Julia Livilla (c. 18 – c. 41 AD) was the youngest child of Germanicus and Agrippina the Elder and the youngest sister of the Emperor Caligula.

== Life ==
Julia Livilla was the youngest great-granddaughter of Emperor Augustus, great-niece and adoptive granddaughter of the Emperor Tiberius, sister of the Emperor Caligula, niece of the Emperor Claudius, and through her eldest sister Agrippina the Younger, maternal aunt of the Emperor Nero. In most ancient literary sources, on inscriptions and on coins, she is simply called "Julia". It is possible that she dropped the use of her cognomen after the damnatio memoriae of her paternal aunt Livilla (sister of Germanicus and Claudius) after whom she was named. However, on her sepulchral inscription, she is explicitly named "Livilla, daughter of Germanicus", which suggests that in her time she was called either "Julia" or "Livilla".

She was born on Lesbos, one of the many Greek islands during her parents' grand tour of the eastern Mediterranean, leading Germanicus to his command base in the imperial province of Syria for the maius imperium given to him by Tiberius over the territory east of the Adriatic Sea. As a young child, she was with her mother and brother Caligula when they returned to Rome after Germanicus' untimely death in Antioch in 19 AD.

Julia Livilla grew up in the household of her great-grandmother Livia and later under the care of her paternal grandmother Antonia Minor. She was first betrothed to a distant cousin, Publius Quinctilius Varus the Younger, son of the ill-fated governor of Germania, Publius Quinctilius Varus, and of Claudia Pulchra, grandniece of Augustus, but after Quinctillius was charged of maiestas in 27, the marriage did not occur. In 33, she married Marcus Vinicius. Vinicius' family came from a small town outside of Rome. He descended from a family of the equites class and his father and grandfather had served as consuls. Her husband was mild in character and was an elaborate orator. Vinicius was appointed by Tiberius as a commissioner in early 37. He was also consul in 30 and proconsul of Asia in 38/39. According to an inscription, Julia Livilla may have accompanied her husband in Asia during his proconsulship.

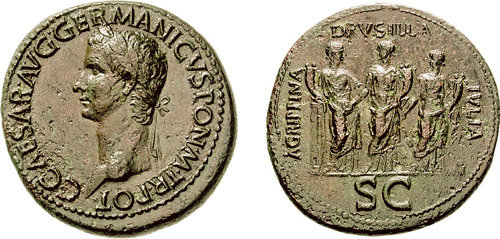
During the reign of Caligula, coins were issued depicting his three sisters, Agrippina, Drusilla and Iulia

During the first years of Caligula's reign, Livilla, along with her elder sisters Agrippina the Younger and Julia Drusilla, received considerable honours and striking privileges, such as the rights of the Vestal Virgins (like the freedom to view public games from the upper seats in the stadium), the inclusion of her name in the oath of loyalty to the emperor and her depiction on coins. Although seeming to experience an eventful and privileged court life, she was under full control of her brother, and, according to Suetonius, she, along with Agrippina, was prostituted by her brother to his catamites. Ancient writers even report gossip of incestuous relationships between Caligula and his sisters, including Livilla.

In 39, Livilla was involved in an unsuccessful conspiracy (led perhaps by Agrippina) to overthrow Caligula and to replace him with his brother-in-law Marcus Aemilius Lepidus (Drusilla's widower, but also alleged lover of Agrippina and Livilla). Livilla and her sister Agrippina the Younger were banished to the Pontine Islands (they were most likely separated in their exile and each one sent to a different island). After the deaths of Caligula, his fourth wife Milonia Caesonia, and their daughter Julia Drusilla, she returned from exile on the orders of the new emperor, Livilla's paternal uncle Claudius. Later in 41, she fell out of favour with Messalina (Claudius's third wife) and was charged by her paternal uncle Claudius with having adultery with Seneca the Younger. Both were exiled. She was most likely sent to Ventotene. Political considerations may have played a role in Julia Livilla's fate, more than just moral or domestic preoccupations as inferred in the ancient sources. In late 41 or early 42, her uncle ordered her execution, apparently by starvation, without a defense and on unsupported charges. She was executed around the same time as her cousin Julia Livia, the daughter of her aunt Livilla. Her remains were later brought back to Rome, probably when Agrippina became Empress; they were laid to rest in the Mausoleum of Augustus.

The sepulchral inscription found on her cippus (tombstone) reads: "Livilla, daughter of Germanicus, lies here" (LIVILLA GERMANICI CAESARIS FILIA HIC SITA EST). A rich and precious vase found near this cippus is believed to have contained Livilla's ashes.

== Cultural depictions ==
- In I, Claudius and Claudius the God, the novels by Robert Graves, Livilla is called 'Lesbia', a name alluding to the island where she was born. She was almost omitted from the television adaptation, there was just a brief mention of Caligula having three sisters at one point, and another brief mention of two sisters just before his assassination.
- In the 1968 British television series The Caesars Julia Livilla was portrayed by Jenny White.
- In the 2019 Roman Empire season 3: Caligula: The Mad Emperor, Julia Livilla was played by New Zealand actress Molly Leishman.

== Ancestry ==
Ancestors of Julia Livilla

8. Tiberius Claudius Nero
4. Nero Claudius Drusus
9. Livia Drusilla
2. Germanicus
10. Mark Antony
5. Antonia Minor
11. Octavia Minor
1. Julia Livilla
12. Lucius Vipsanius
6. Marcus Vipsanius Agrippa
3. Agrippina the Elder
14. Augustus
7. Julia the Elder
15. Scribonia

== See also ==
- Julio-Claudian family tree
