= Molly Leishman =

New Zealand actress

- Born: Molly Leishman; March 1, 1998 (age 28); Auckland, North Island, New Zealand,
- Education: Victoria University of Wellington
- Occupation: Actress
- Years active: 2010–present
- Notable work: Agent Anna, Roman Empire =
- Relatives: Father - Mark Leishman and mother - Jo Raymond

Molly Leishman is a New Zealand actress, known for her regular appearances from 2013 to 2014 as Isabella Kingston in New Zealand comedy-drama television series Agent Anna , for her lead role in three seasons of TVNZ's The Cul De Sac and Wilde Ride and for playing Caligula's sister Livilla in Roman Empire in 2019. She also guest starred as Kerry in Power Rangers Beast Morphers and Sienna in Shortland Street .

== Early life ==
Molly Leishman was born on March 1, 1998 in Auckland, New Zealand and is the daughter of television and radio broadcaster Mark Leishman (father) and Jo Raymond (mother). Leishman began her education at the Diocesan School for Girls, Auckland, before attending the ACG Senior College in Auckland. Leishman went on to study for a Bachelor's degree in Design for Social Innovation (DSI) at Victoria University of Wellington.

== Acting career ==
Leishman was aged 11 when she had her debut television appearance in a cornflakes advert. In 2010, she starred as a child actress in a lead role in the Michael Keusch directed television film Forever New Zealand as Lissy, and has made appearances in Agent Anna as Anna's daughter Isabella Kingston, and in TVNZ's television family drama, Wilde Ride in 2017. Leishman starred as Eliza in The Cul De Sac (TV series) which was awarded ‘Regional Winner (Australia & New Zealand) Best Children's Programme’ at the 2019 Asian Academy Creative Awards. In 2019, Leishman starred as Livilla (Caligula’s sister) in Series 3 “Caligula: The Mad Emperor” of the television documentary series, Roman Empire.

== Filmography ==
=== Television ===
| Year | Title | Role | Notes |
|---|---|---|---|
| 2010 | Forever New Zealand (TV film) | Lissy | |
| 2013–2014 | Agent Anna | Bella Kingston | 16 episodes |
| 2016 | Hillary (TV series) | Belinda Hillary | 1 episode - Heartbreak |
| 2017 | Wilde Ride (TV series) | Georgia | 6 episodes |
| 2016–2018 | The Cul De Sac (TV series) | Eliza / Dark Queen | 16 episodes |
| 2019 | Roman Empire | Livilla (Caligula's sister) | Series 3 “Caligula: The Mad Emperor” - 3 episodes |
| 2019 | Shortland Street | Sienna Lipton | 7 episodes |
| 2020 | Power Rangers Beast Morphers | Kerry Dixon | 1 episode - Game On! |
| 2020 | Together Forever Tea | Amy | TV film |
| 2020 | My Life is Murder | Eden | 1 episode - Oceans Apart |
| 2021 | One of Us Is Lying | Mallory | S1 episodes 4 & 8 - "One of Us Is Famous" & "One of Us Is Dead" |
