= Marcus Aemilius Lepidus (executed by Caligula) =

Roman politician; Caligula's brother-in-law (died 39)

Marcus Aemilius Lepidus (died 39) was a Roman Patrician and the husband of the emperor Caligula's younger sister Julia Drusilla.

== Biography ==
Some areas of his lineage are unclear. He was possibly the son of consul Lucius Aemilius Paullus. If so, he was also great-grandson of Lucius Aemilius Lepidus Paullus (consul of 50 BC and brother of the triumvir Marcus Aemilius Lepidus), and through his mother Julia the Younger, Lepidus was the great grandson of Emperor Augustus. It is also possible that he was instead the son of Marcus Aemilius Lepidus the consul of 6 AD.

Lepidus married Caligula's sister Drusilla sometime in November or December of 37. Little is known about him prior to this. Drusilla had been married to Lucius Cassius Longinus since 33 but Caligula forced his brother-in-law to divorce Drusilla so that she could marry Lepidus. Cassius Dio and Suetonius both suggest that the emperor and his brother-in-law were lovers. The marriage lasted until Drusilla's death in June 38. They had no children. Because of this marriage, Lepidus became a close friend to Caligula and his family. After the death of Gemellus in 37, Lepidus was publicly marked by Caligula as his heir. In late 38, when the governor of Egypt Aulus Avilius Flaccus was arrested, Lepidus successfully persuaded Caligula to exile Flaccus to Andros rather than Gyarus.

In 39, Caligula made public letters by his sisters Agrippina the Younger and Julia Livilla that detailed an adulterous affair with Lepidus and a plot against the emperor. Lepidus was executed and Caligula's sisters were exiled. Agrippina was given the bones of Lepidus in an urn, and she carried them to Rome. Caligula sent three daggers to the Temple of Mars the Avenger to celebrate the death. In the Senate, Vespasian made a motion that the remains of Lepidus be thrown away instead of buried. The motion was carried and Lepidus was not given a proper burial.

== Cultural depictions ==
A sculpture of Lepidus has been found at the imperial sebasteion in Aphrodisias.
