= Crepereius Gallus =

Crepereius Gallus was a Roman notable in the first century AD and an associate of Agrippina, the mother of the emperor Nero. His entire contribution to written history is contained in a single chapter of the Annals of the historian Tacitus, who describes the plot to kill Agrippina through the mechanism of a collapsing boat. Crepereius Gallus is introduced and dies within the course of a single sentence:

nec multum erat progressa nauis, duobus e numero familiarum Agrippinam comitantibus, ex quis Crepereius Gallus haud procul gubernaculis adstabat, Acerronia super pedes cubitantis reclinis paenitentiam filii et reciperatam matris gratiam per gaudium memorabat, cum dato signo ruere tectum loci multo plumbo graue, pressusque Crepereius et statim exanimatus est.

The boat had not gone very far and two members of Agrippina's household were present - Crepereius Gallus was standing not far from the helm; Acerronia was reclining over the feet of Agrippina as she lay and was describing joyfully the repentance of her son and the mother's recovery of favour - when, after a signal had been given, the roof of this part of the boat, which was laden down with much lead, fell, and Crepereius was crushed and died instantly.

In 1964, it was suggested that he may be identical with the procurator Augusti, C. Crepereius Gallus, honoured on an inscription from Antioch of Pisidia, but this cannot be confirmed. The authors of the same article describe his role in recorded history as 'insignificant, passive, and brief'.

Little is known about the Crepereius family other than that it was equestrian. One attested family member is Marcus Crepereius, a judge in the case of Verres as mentioned by Cicero (in Verres 1.10). Further, the name Q. Crepereius M. F. Rocus has been found on several coins depicting Venus and Neptune which could relate him to Corinth.
