= Julia Drusilla =

Member of the Julio-Claudian dynasty (AD 16–38)

- Diva
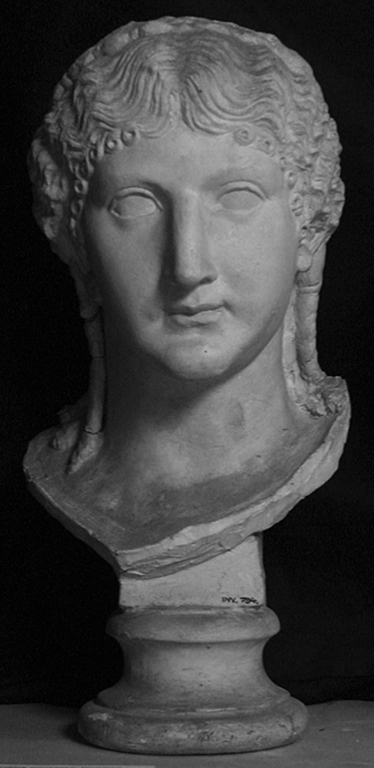
- Drusilla, Statens Museum for Kunst
- Born: 16 September 16 AD; Abitarvium, Germania
- Died: 10 June 38 AD (aged 21); Rome, Italy
- Spouse: Lucius Cassius Longinus; Marcus Aemilius Lepidus
Posthumous name
- Diva Drusilla Panthea
- Dynasty: Julio-Claudian
- Father: Germanicus
- Mother: Agrippina the Elder

Julia Drusilla (16 September 16 – 10 June 38 AD) was a member of the Roman imperial family, the second daughter and fifth child of Germanicus and Agrippina the Elder to survive infancy. She was the favorite sister of Emperor Caligula, who, after her death, had her deified under the name Diva Drusilla Panthea, and named his daughter Julia Drusilla after her.

== Biography ==
=== Early life ===
Drusilla was born in Abitarvium, modern-day Koblenz, Germany. Besides the future emperor she also had two other brothers, Nero Julius Caesar and Drusus Caesar, as well as two sisters, Julia Livilla and the later empress Agrippina the Younger. She was a great-granddaughter of the Emperor Augustus and empress Livia, grand-niece of the Emperor Tiberius, niece of the Emperor Claudius, and aunt of the Emperor Nero. After the death of her father, Germanicus, she and her siblings were brought back to Rome by their mother and raised with the help of their paternal grandmother, Antonia Minor.

=== Marriages ===
In 33, Drusilla was married to Lucius Cassius Longinus, a friend of the Emperor Tiberius. She and Cassius are not known to have had any children. (Note: Some historians have tentatively speculated that she could have been the mother of Cassia Longina, mother of empress Domitia Longina, but this theory is not endorsed to any extent. Ronald Syme believes that if Cassia was a daughter of Lucius then she was so by a later wife.) After Caligula became emperor in 37, he ordered their divorce and married his sister to his friend Marcus Aemilius Lepidus.

During an illness in 37, Caligula changed his will to name Drusilla his heir, making her the first woman to be named heir in a Roman imperial will. This was probably an attempt to continue the Julian line through any children she might have, leaving her husband to rule in the meantime. Caligula recovered, however, and in 38, at the age of 21, Drusilla died. Her brother went on to deify her, consecrating her with the title Panthea (all-goddess) and mourning at her public funeral as though he were a widower.

== Reputation ==
Drusilla was widely reputed to be her brother's favorite, likely affording her great influence over Caligula. The rumors of incest that surrounded Drusilla could be attempts to discredit Caligula's leadership following his death. The most popular source of these rumors comes from Suetonius, a Roman historian born 28 years after Caligula's death; he wrote that "[Caligula] lived in habitual incest with all his sisters", claiming Caligula and Drusilla had once been caught together by their grandmother, Antonia.

Rumors reported the brother and sister were lovers from a young age, with their public relationship deemed incestuous by various contemporaries. Caligula treated Drusilla as if she were his "legal wife" even while she was married. Drusilla earned a rather poor reputation because of the close bond she shared with Caligula, and was likened to a prostitute by later scholars attempting to discredit Caligula.

Some historians suggest that Caligula was motivated by more than mere lust or love in pursuing intimate relationships with his sisters, instead employing a deliberate pattern for Roman lineage based on the Hellenistic monarchs of the Ptolemaic dynasty, where marriages between jointly ruling brothers and sisters had become tradition rather than sex scandals. This also has been used to explain why his despotism apparently was more evident to his contemporaries than those of Augustus and Tiberius.

One source of rumors surrounding Caligula and Drusilla may be derived from formal Roman dining habits. It was customary in patrician households for the host and hostess of a dinner (typically the husband and wife, as heads of the household) to be seated in positions of honor at banquets in their residence. In the case of a young bachelor being the head of the household, the female position of honor was traditionally filled by his sisters, in rotation: in Caligula's case, Agrippina the Younger, Drusilla, and Julia Livilla would have taken turns sitting in the place of honor. Caligula apparently broke with this tradition and reserved the place of honor exclusively for Drusilla. This could also be understood as Caligula placing Drusilla in a place of public prominence after naming her as heir.

== Death and aftermath ==
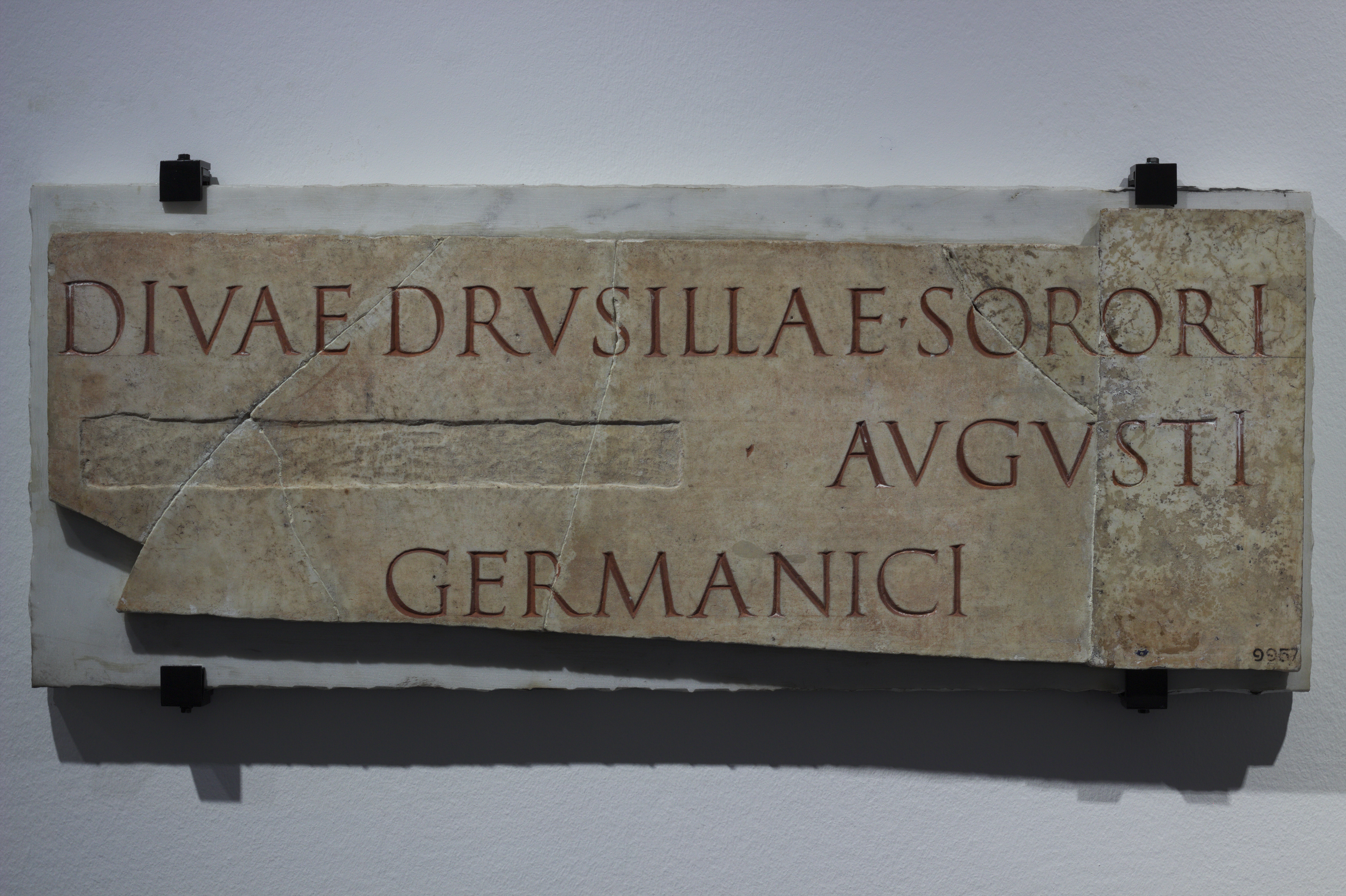
Inscription found at Caere (Etruria), dedicated to deified Drusilla, sister of Caius Augustus, whose name is cancelled. CIL XI, 3598

Drusilla died on 10 June 38 AD, probably of an illness that was rampant in Rome at the time. Caligula was said never to have left her side throughout her illness and, after she had died, he would not let anyone take away her body.

Caligula was badly affected by the loss. He buried his sister with the honors of an Augusta and acted as a grieving widower. He had the Roman Senate declare her a goddess, as Diva Drusilla, deifying her as a representation of the Roman goddess Venus or the Greek goddess Aphrodite. Drusilla was consecrated as Panthea, most likely on the anniversary of the birthday of Augustus. R. B. Hoffsten considered Drusilla to have also become Augusta, because, after her death, she received all the honors that Livia had received.

In addition to the other honors she was given after her death by Caligula, he also declared a period of mourning. During this time, it became a capital crime to laugh, bathe, or dine with your parents, spouse, or children.

A year later, Caligula named his only known daughter, Julia Drusilla, after his dead sister. Meanwhile, the widowed husband of Drusilla, Marcus Aemilius Lepidus, reportedly became a lover to her sisters, Julia Livilla and Agrippina the Younger, in an apparent attempt to gain their support so that he could succeed Caligula. This political conspiracy was discovered during that autumn by Caligula while in Germania Superior. Lepidus was swiftly executed and Livilla and Agrippina were exiled to the Pontine Islands.

== Portrayals ==
- The narrator of the story in the Robert Graves novel I, Claudius states that Drusilla was killed by Caligula, though admitting he does not have firm evidence of this belief.
- This theme was embellished considerably in the 1976 BBC television adaptation of I, Claudius, where Drusilla was played by Beth Morris. A pregnant Drusilla was subjected to a brutal Caesarean section by an insane Caligula, who swallows the child off-camera as Chronos did his children. A subsequent shot depicting Caligula and his blood-soaked beard was cut from the episode before broadcast in the United States, but has since been restored in later VHS and DVD releases.
- Teresa Ann Savoy played Drusilla in the 1979 motion picture Caligula, which showed a version of Drusilla dying from a fever, followed by a scene of Caligula licking her corpse in mourning.

== See also ==
- Julio-Claudian family tree
