= Gustav Wertheimer =

Austrian painter

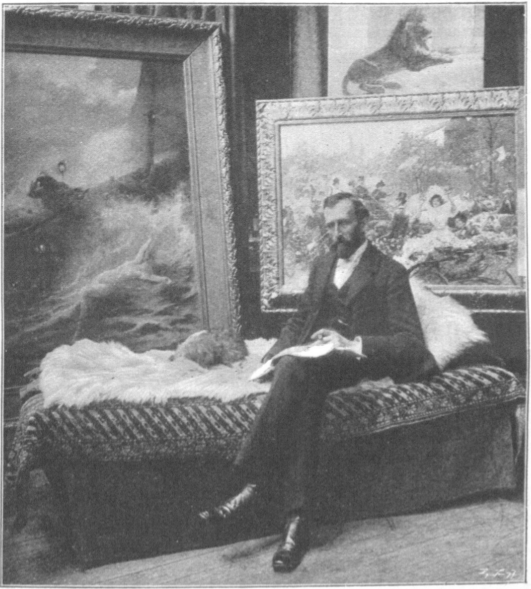
The artist in his studio (c. 1901)

Gustav Wertheimer (1847–1902) was an Austrian painter, active mainly in Paris. He produced history paintings, portraits, and genre scenes.

== Life ==
Gustav Wertheimer was born in Vienna on 28 January 1847. He trained under Carl Mayer and Joseph von Führich at the Academy of Fine Arts Vienna from 1863 to 1867, and under Wilhelm von Dietz at the Academy of Fine Arts, Munich. He exhibited the large historical painting Nero während des Brandes in Rom ('Nero during the Fire in Rome') at the 1873 Vienna World's Fair.

In 1882 he moved to Paris, where he enjoyed his greatest success. Le repas des lions chez Pezon ('Lions Eating at Pezon'), exhibited in the Salon of 1886, received particular attention. According to the Benezit Dictionary of Artists, "His compositions take on a fantastic character, seeming to belong to the realm of dreams, and are tainted with anguish and anxiety."

Wertheimer was awarded medals at exhibitions in Amsterdam, London, New Orleans and Paris, and received honourable mentions at the Expositions Universelle of 1889 and 1900. He also participated in the last Salon de la Rose-Croix in 1897.

Shortly after 1900, at the end of his life, the patrons abandoned him. He died of consumption in the Hôpital Larisboisière on 24 August 1902, destitute and alone. However, his obituary in the Viennese magazine Sport & Salon was flattering:

In Vienna, one could only see relatively few works by the master in art exhibitions, since Wertheimer, if his pictures were not already sold off the easel, always sold them at the first exhibition in the Paris Salon.

== Selected works ==
- Nero während des Brandes in Rom ('Nero during the Fire in Rome'), 1873.
- Schiffbruch der Agrippina ('Shipwreck of Agrippina'), also called Tod der Agrippina ('Death of Agrippina'), 1874.
- Le repas des lions chez Pezon ('Lions Eating at Pezon'), 1886.

== Gallery ==
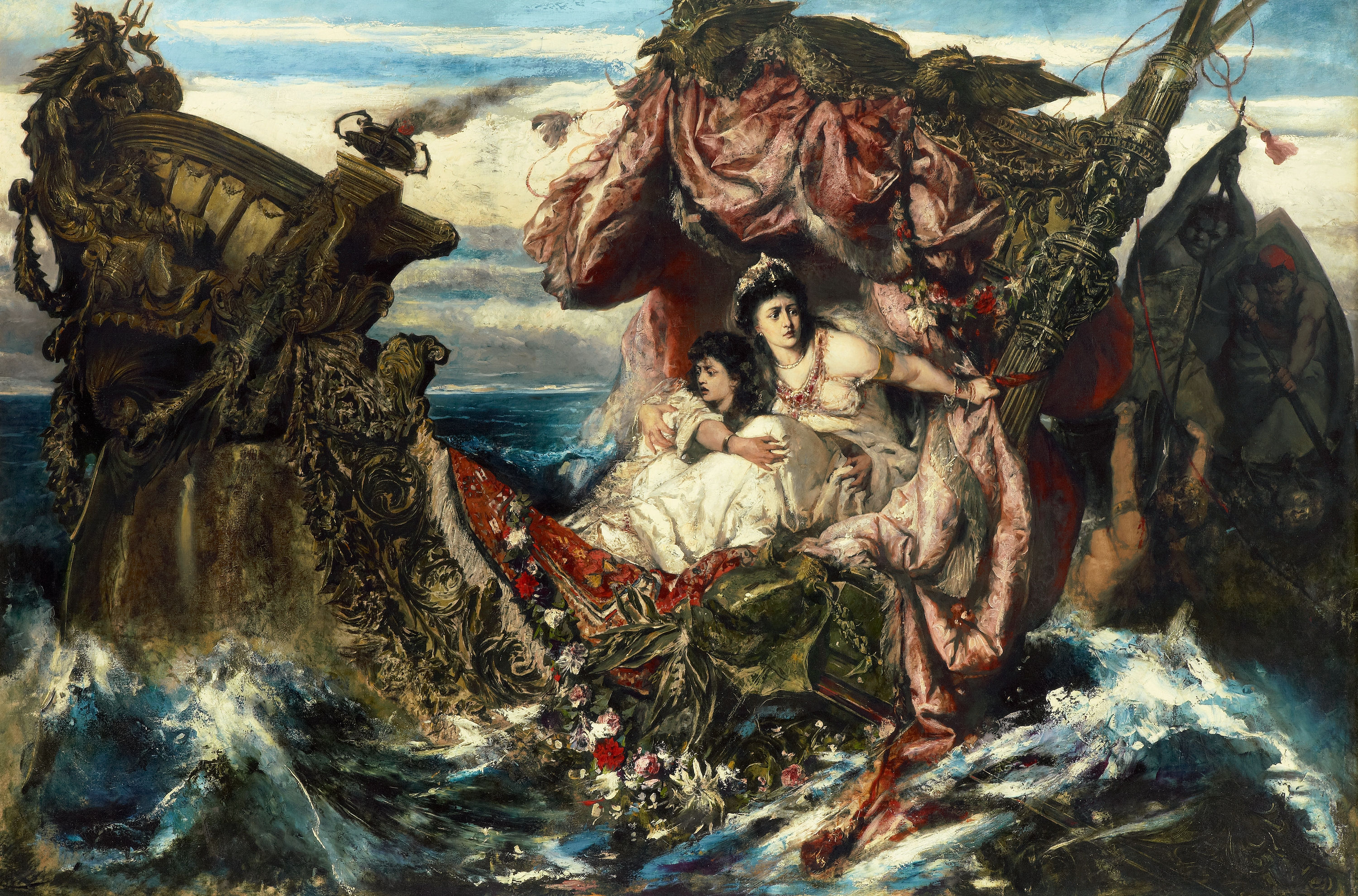
The Shipwreck of Agrippina (1874)

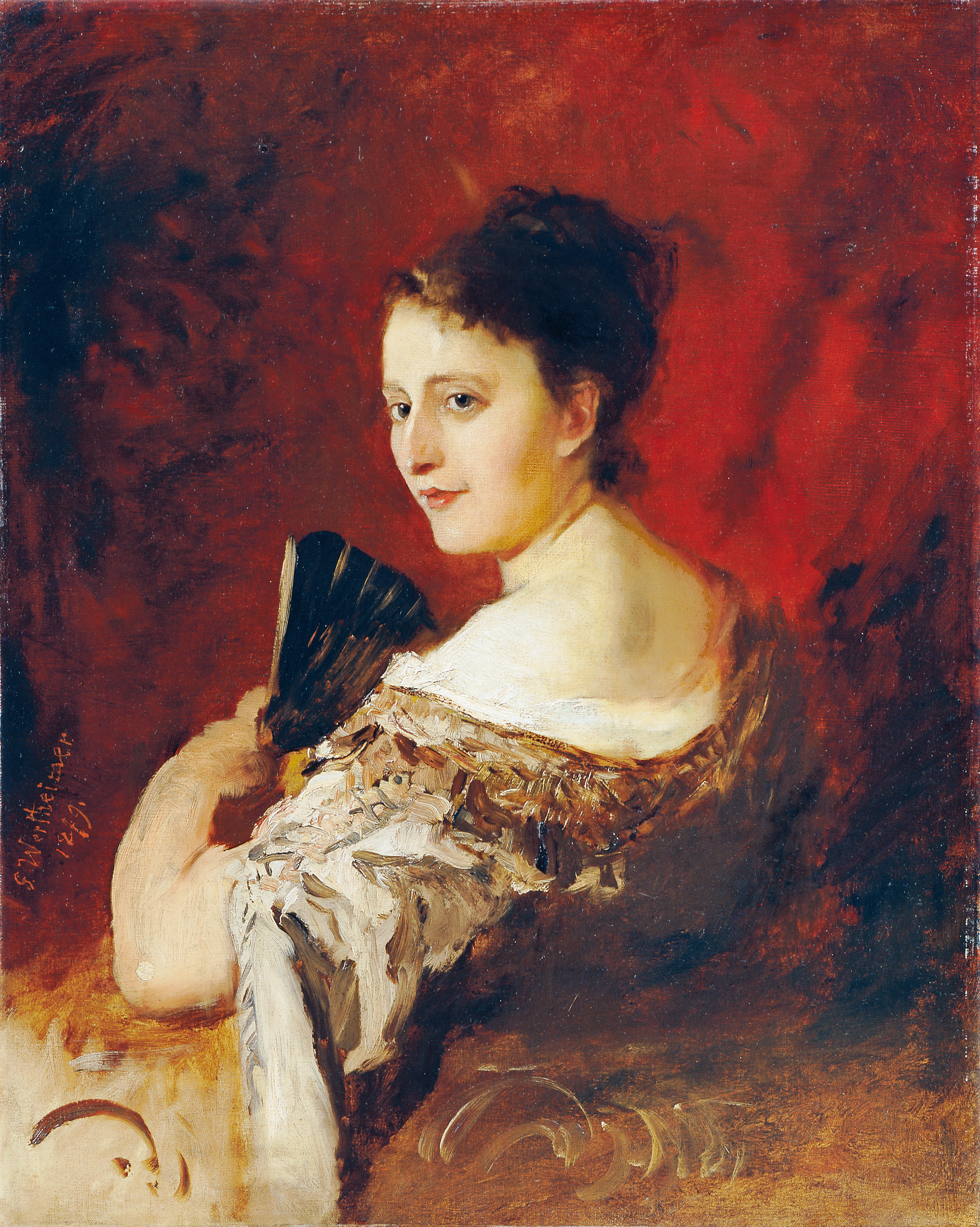
Theresia Fritz (1879)

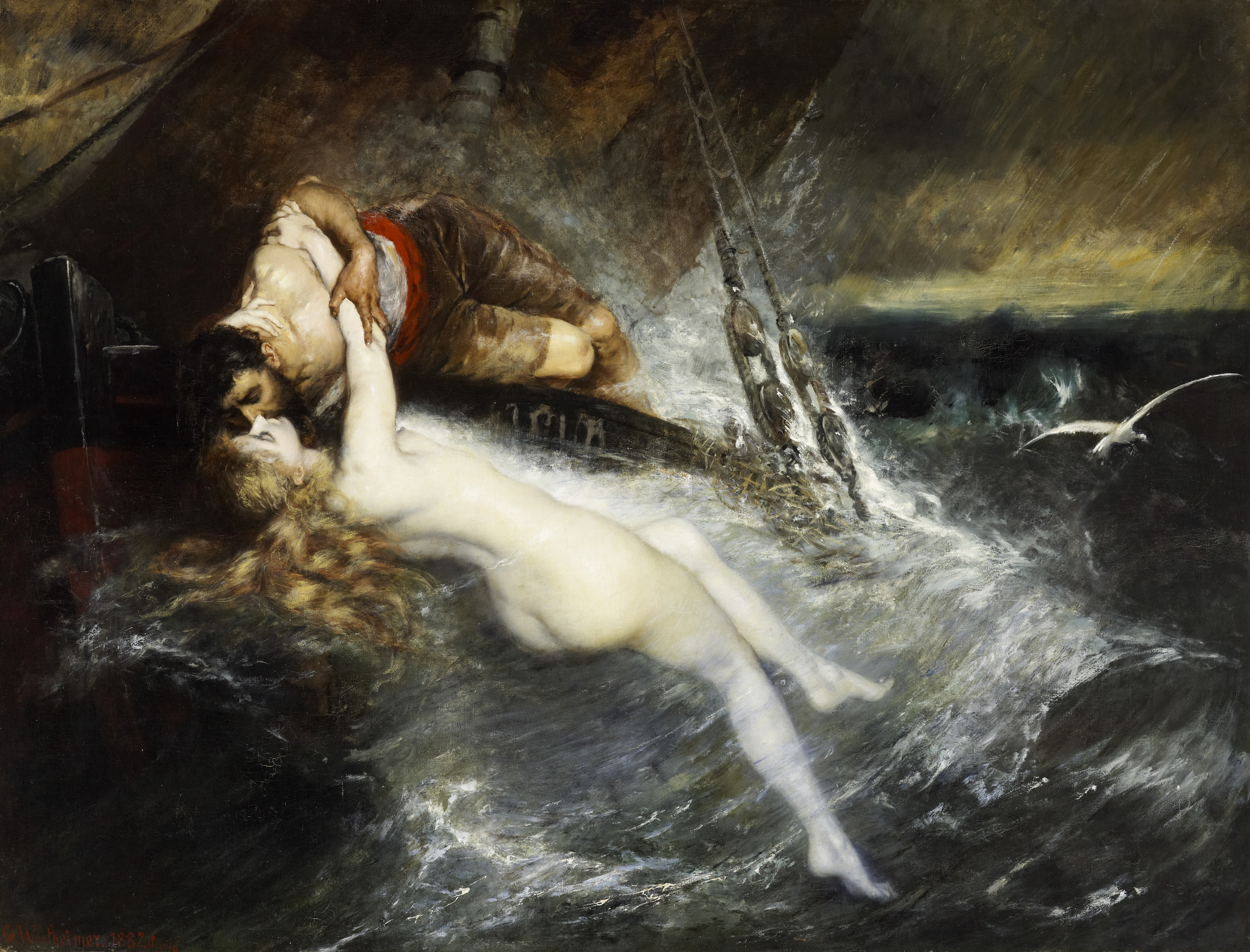
The Kiss of the Siren (1882)

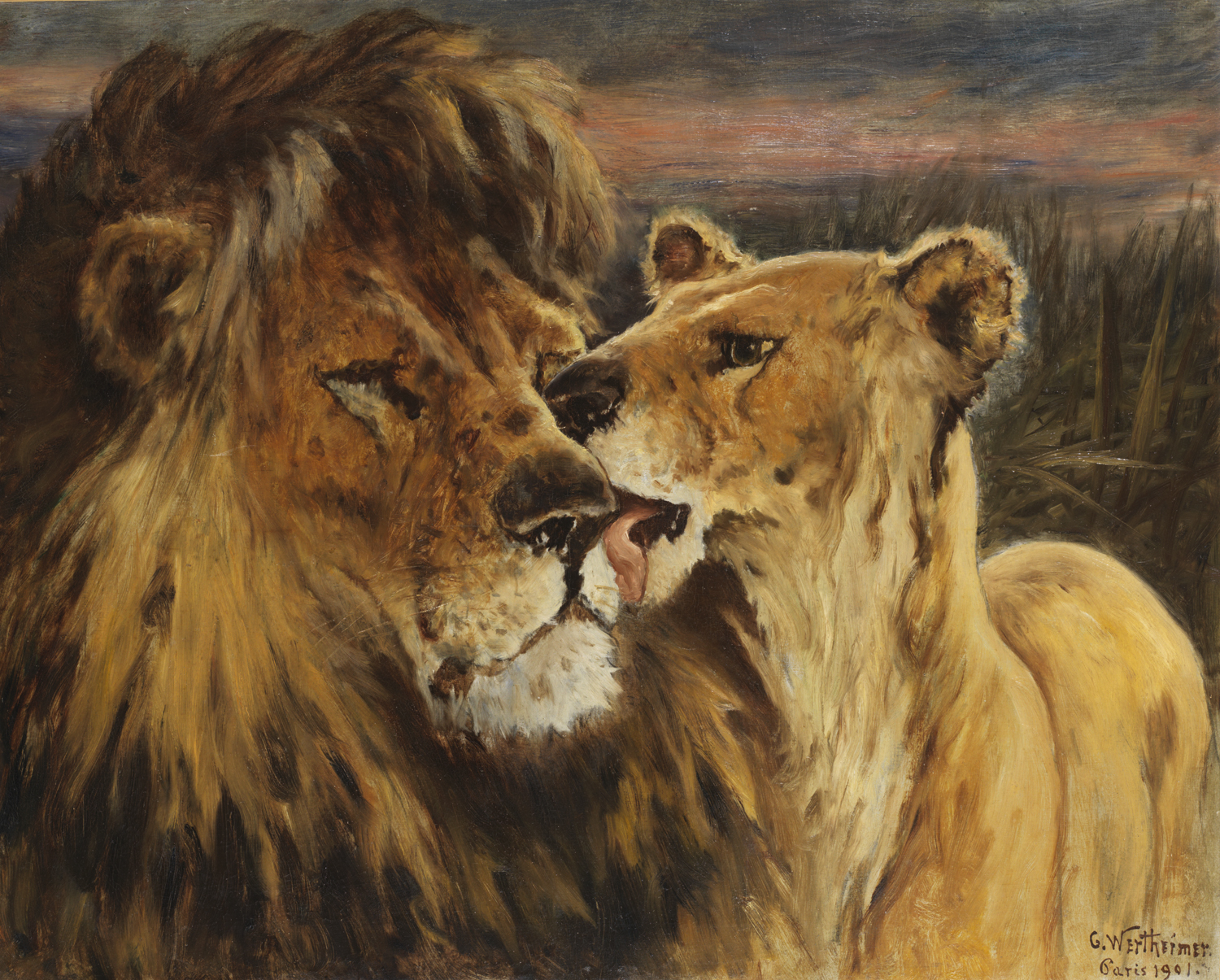
Couple of Lions (1901)

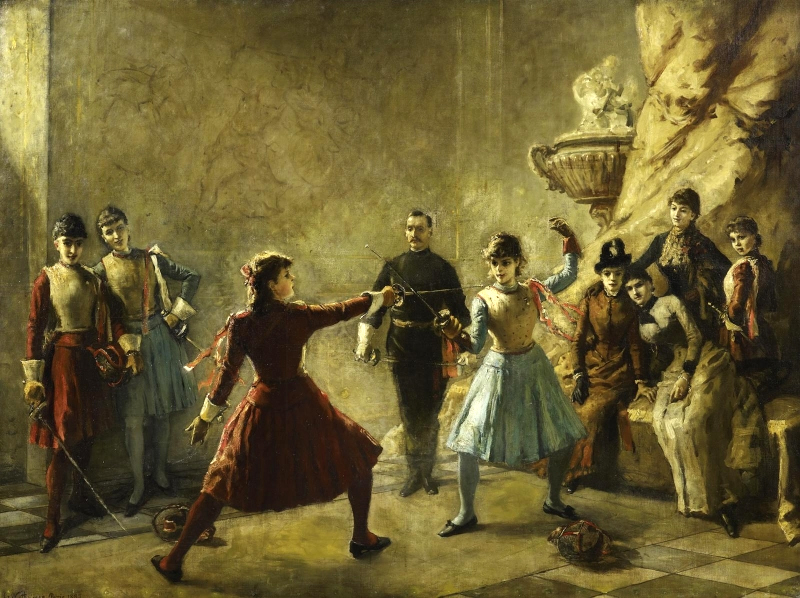
The Women's Fencing Lesson

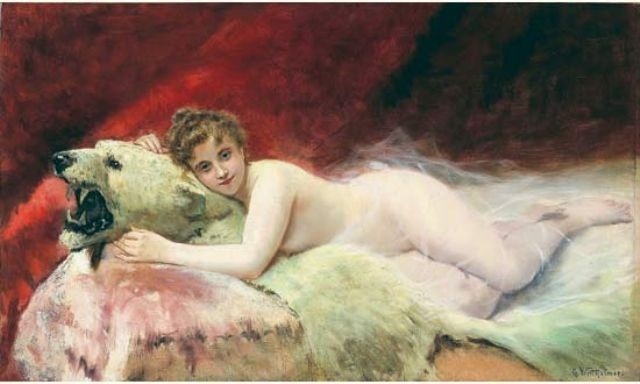
Bear-skin Nude
