= Pro Tullio =

Fragmentary oration of Cicero, 72 BC

Pro Tullio (Latin for "On behalf of Tullius") is a partially preserved speech delivered by the Roman orator Cicero in 72 or 71 BC. The speech was made on behalf of Cicero's client, Marcus Tullius, who claimed legal damages from his neighbor, Publius Fabius, on the basis that Fabius had murdered several of Tullius' slaves in a property dispute.
