= Agrippina the Younger =

Roman empress from AD 49 to 54

- Augusta
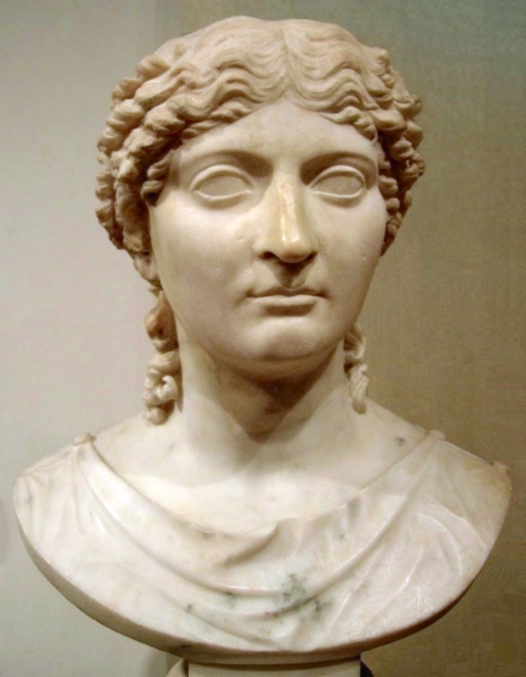
- A bust at the National Museum, Warsaw

Roman empress
- Tenure: 1 January AD 49 – 13 October AD 54
- Born: 6 November AD 15; Oppidum Ubiorum (present-day Cologne, Germany)
- Died: 23 March AD 59 (aged 43); Misenum, Italy
- Spouses: Gnaeus Domitius Ahenobarbus; Gaius Sallustius Passienus Crispus; Claudius
- Issue: Nero
- Dynasty: Julio-Claudian
- Father: Germanicus
- Mother: Agrippina the Elder

Julia Agrippina (6 November AD 15 – 23 March AD 59), also referred to as Agrippina the Younger, was Roman empress from AD 49 to 54, the fourth wife and niece of emperor Claudius, and the mother of Nero.

Agrippina was one of the most prominent women in the Julio-Claudian dynasty. She was the great-granddaughter of Augustus (the first Roman emperor) and the daughter of the Roman general Germanicus and Agrippina the Elder. Her father, Germanicus, was the nephew and heir apparent of the second emperor, Tiberius. Agrippina's brother Caligula became emperor in AD 37. After Caligula was assassinated in AD 41, Germanicus' brother Claudius took the throne. Agrippina married Claudius in AD 49.

Agrippina has been described by ancient sources as ruthless, ambitious, domineering, and using her powerful political ties to influence the affairs of the Roman state, particularly in maneuvering her son Nero into the line of succession. Claudius eventually became aware of her plotting, but died in AD 54 under suspicious circumstances, potentially poisoned by Agrippina herself. She exerted significant political influence in the early years of her son's reign, but eventually fell out of favor with him and was killed in AD 59. Physically, Agrippina was described as a beautiful and reputable woman; and, according to Pliny the Elder, had a double canine in her upper right jaw, which was regarded as a sign of good fortune in Ancient Rome.

== Family ==
Agrippina was the first daughter and fourth living child of Agrippina the Elder and Germanicus.

She had three elder brothers, Nero Caesar, Drusus Caesar, and the future emperor Caligula, and two younger sisters, Julia Drusilla and Julia Livilla. Agrippina's two eldest brothers and her mother were victims of the intrigues of the Praetorian Prefect Lucius Aelius Sejanus.

She was the namesake of her mother. Agrippina the Elder was remembered as a modest and heroic matron, who was the second daughter and fourth child of Julia the Elder and the statesman Marcus Vipsanius Agrippa. The father of Julia the Elder was the emperor Augustus, and Julia was his only natural child from his second marriage to Scribonia, who had close blood relations with Pompey the Great and Lucius Cornelius Sulla.

Germanicus, Agrippina's father, was a very popular general and politician. His mother was Antonia Minor and his father was the general Nero Claudius Drusus. He was Antonia Minor's first child. Germanicus had two younger siblings: Livilla and Claudius, making the pair Agrippina's aunt and uncle, respectively. Not only would Claudius later serve as Roman emperor, he would also go on to take Agrippina, his own niece, as his wife.

Antonia Minor was a daughter to Octavia the Younger by her second marriage to triumvir Mark Antony, and Octavia was the second eldest sister and full-blooded sister of Augustus. Germanicus' father, Drusus the Elder, was the second son of the Empress Livia Drusilla by her first marriage to praetor Tiberius Nero, and was the emperor Tiberius's younger brother and Augustus's stepson.

In the year AD 9, Augustus ordered Tiberius to adopt Germanicus, who happened to be Tiberius's nephew, as his son and heir. Germanicus was a favourite of Augustus, who hoped that he would succeed Tiberius, who was Augustus's adopted son and heir and then emperor following Augustus' death in AD 14. This in turn meant that Tiberius was also Agrippina's adoptive grandfather in addition to her paternal great-uncle.

== Birth and early life ==
Agrippina was born on 6 November in AD 15, or possibly AD 14, at Oppidum Ubiorum, a Roman outpost on the Rhine River located in present-day Cologne, Germany. A second sister Julia Drusilla was born on 16 September AD 16, also in Germany.

Agrippina's place of birth is disputed, with Cologne being seen as a likely place considering how Agrippina would favor the city and the Colonia Claudia Ara Agrippinensium being established at her prompting there.

Suetonius however claims that both of Germanicus's eldest daughters were born in Trier in Gaul.

As a small child, Agrippina travelled with her parents throughout Germany until she and her siblings (apart from Caligula) returned to Rome to live with and be raised by their paternal grandmother Antonia. Tiberius gave her father Germanicus supreme command over the empire's eastern provinces, so in AD 18 her parents departed for Syria. According to Tacitus, their third daughter Julia Livilla was born en route on the island of Lesbos, probably on 18 March.

In October of AD 19 Germanicus died suddenly in Antioch (present-day Antakya, Turkey). His death caused much public grief in Rome and though it was officially attributed to illness, Gnaeus Calpurnius Piso (the governor of Syria) and his wife Munatia Plancina were widely suspected of poisoning him. His daughter Agrippina was then four years old; thereafter she was supervised by her mother, her paternal grandmother Antonia Minor, and her great-grandmother, Livia. She lived on the Palatine Hill in Rome.

== Marriage to Gnaeus Domitius Ahenobarbus ==
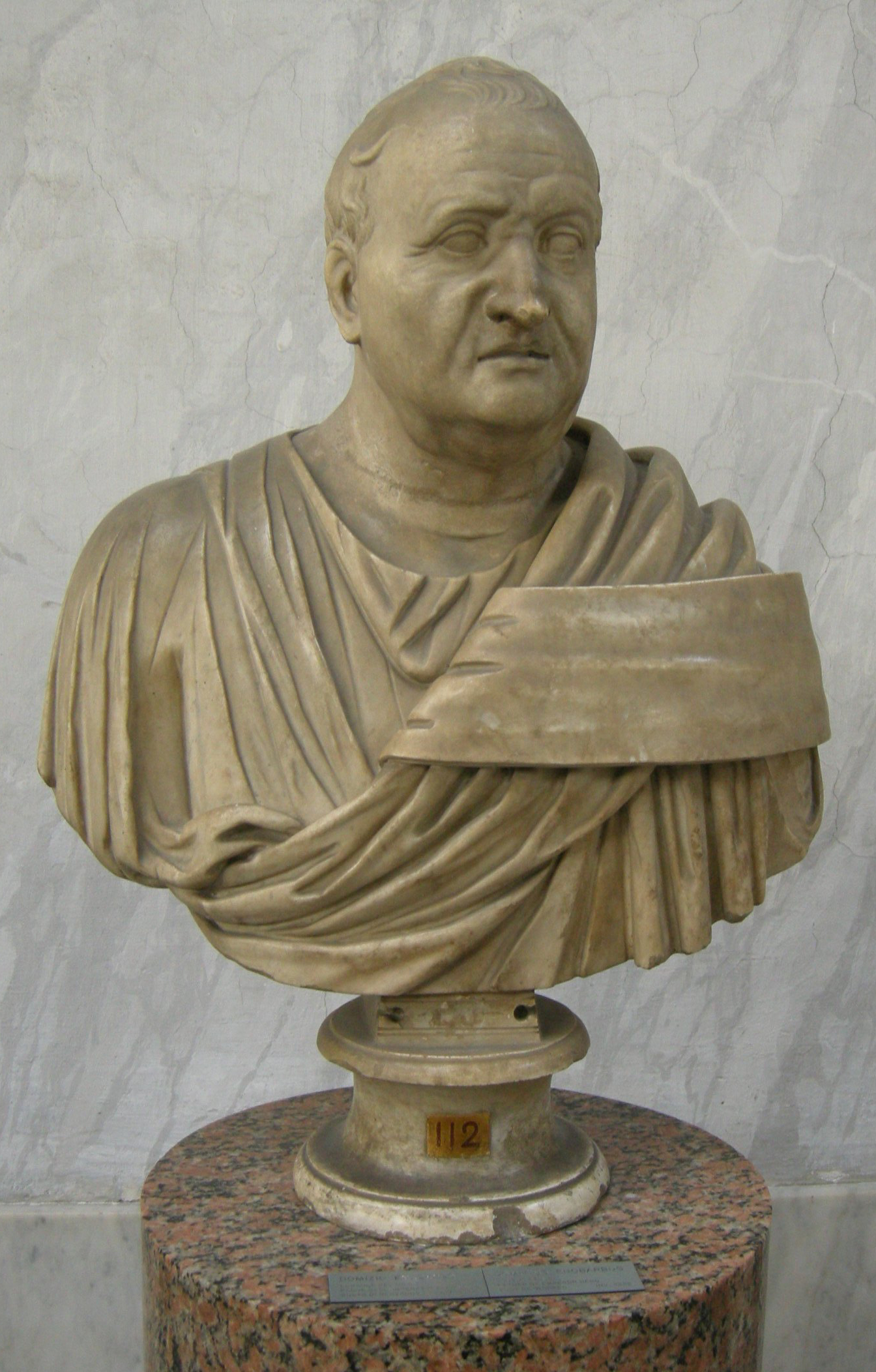
Bust of Gnaeus Domitius Ahenobarbus

After her thirteenth birthday in AD 28, Tiberius arranged for Agrippina to marry her paternal first cousin once removed Gnaeus Domitius Ahenobarbus and ordered the marriage to be celebrated in Rome. Domitius came from a distinguished family of consular rank. Through his mother Antonia Major, Domitius was a great nephew of Augustus, first cousin to Claudius, and first cousin once removed to Agrippina and Caligula. He had two sisters; Domitia Lepida the Elder and Domitia Lepida the Younger. Domitia Lepida the Younger was the mother of the Empress Valeria Messalina.

Antonia Major was the elder sister to Antonia Minor, and the first daughter of Octavia Minor and Mark Antony. Domitius, who was, according to Suetonius, "in every aspect of his life detestable," served as consul in AD 32. Agrippina and Domitius lived between Antium and Rome. Not much is known about the relationship between them.

== Reign of Caligula ==
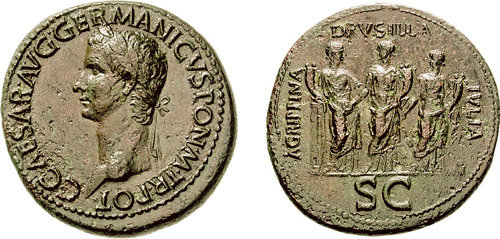
During the reign of Caligula, coins like the one pictured here were issued depicting his three sisters, Drusilla, Livilla, and Agrippina the Younger.

=== Public role and political intrigues ===
Tiberius died on 16 March AD 37, and Agrippina's only surviving brother, Caligula, became the new emperor. Being the emperor's sister gave Agrippina some influence.

Agrippina and her younger sisters Julia Drusilla and Julia Livilla received various honours from their brother, which included but were not limited to

- receiving the rights of the Vestal Virgins, such as the freedom to view public games from the upper seats in the stadium;
- being honoured with a new type of coinage, depicting images of Caligula and his sisters on opposite faces;
- having their names added to motions, including loyalty oaths (e.g., "I will not value my life or that of my children more highly than I do the safety of the Emperor and his sisters") and consular motions (e.g., "Good fortune attend to the Emperor and his sisters)".

Around the time that Tiberius died, Agrippina had become pregnant. Domitius had acknowledged the paternity of the child. On 15 December AD 37, in the early morning, in Antium, Agrippina gave birth to a son. Agrippina and Domitius named their son Lucius Domitius Ahenobarbus, after Domitius' recently deceased father. This child would grow up to become the emperor Nero. Nero was Agrippina's only natural child. Suetonius states that Domitius was congratulated by friends on the birth of his son, whereupon he replied "I don't think anything produced by me and Agrippina could possibly be good for the state or the people".

Caligula and his sisters were accused of having incestuous relationships. On 10 June AD 38, Drusilla died, possibly of a fever, rampant in Rome at the time. Caligula was particularly fond of Drusilla, claiming to treat her as he would his own wife, even though Drusilla had a husband. Following her death, Caligula showed no special love or respect toward the surviving sisters and was said to have gone insane.

In AD 39, Agrippina and Livilla, with their maternal cousin, Drusilla's widower Marcus Aemilius Lepidus, were involved in a failed plot to murder Caligula, a plot known as the Plot of the Three Daggers, which was to make Lepidus the new emperor. Lepidus, Agrippina and Livilla were accused of being lovers. Not much is known concerning this plot and the reasons behind it. At the trial of Lepidus, Caligula felt no compunction about denouncing them as adulteresses, producing handwritten letters discussing how they were going to kill him. The three were found guilty as accessories to the crime.

=== Exile ===
Lepidus was executed. According to the fragmentary inscriptions of the Arval Brethren, Agrippina was forced to carry the urn of Lepidus' ashes back to Rome. Agrippina and Livilla were exiled by their brother to the Ponza, in Pontine Islands, an archipelago of small volcanic islands about 70 miles away from Rome.

Caligula sold their furniture, jewellery, slaves and freedmen. In January of AD 40, Domitius died of edema (dropsy) at Pyrgi. Lucius had gone to live with his second paternal aunt Domitia Lepida the Younger after Caligula had taken his inheritance away from him.

Caligula, his wife Milonia Caesonia and their daughter Julia Drusilla were murdered on 24 January AD 41. Agrippina's paternal uncle, Claudius, brother of her father Germanicus, became the new Roman emperor.

== Reign of Claudius ==
=== Return from exile ===
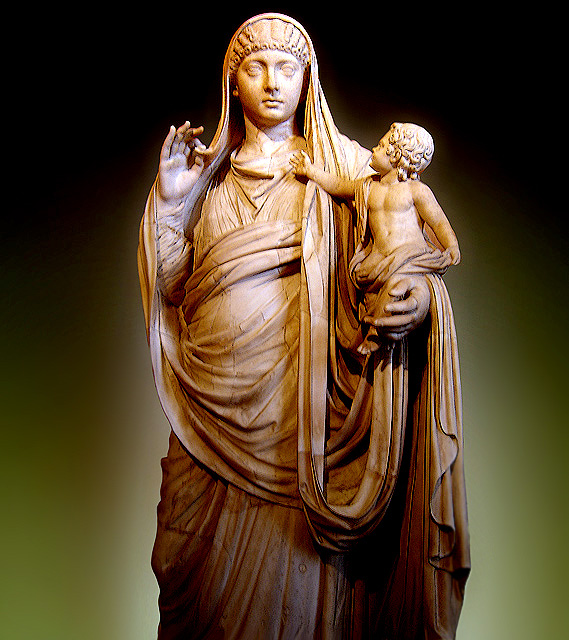
Messalina holding her son Britannicus (Louvre)

Claudius lifted the exiles of Agrippina and Livilla. Livilla returned to her husband, while Agrippina was reunited with her estranged son. After the death of her first husband, Agrippina tried to make shameless advances on the future emperor Galba. He showed no interest, being devoted to his wife Aemilia Lepida. On one occasion, Galba's mother-in-law gave Agrippina a public reprimand and a slap in the face before a whole bevy of married women.

Claudius had Lucius' inheritance reinstated. Lucius became more wealthy despite his youth shortly after Gaius Sallustius Crispus Passienus divorced Lucius' aunt, Domitia Lepida the Elder (Lucius' first paternal aunt) so that Crispus could marry Agrippina. They married, and Crispus became a step-father to Lucius. Crispus was an influential, wealthy and powerful man who served twice as consul. He was the adopted grandson and biological great-great-nephew of the historian Sallust. Little is known about their relationship, but Crispus soon died and left his estate to Nero.

During the first years his reign, Claudius was married to the Empress Valeria Messalina. Messalina was Agrippina's paternal second cousin. Among the victims of Messalina's intrigues were Agrippina's surviving sister Livilla, who was charged with adultery with Seneca the Younger. Although Agrippina was very influential at this time, she kept a low profile and stayed away from the imperial palace and the court of the emperor.

Messalina considered Agrippina's son a threat to her son's position and sent assassins to strangle Lucius during his siesta. The assassins left after they saw a snake beneath Lucius' pillow, considering it a bad omen. It was, however, only a sloughed-off snake-skin. By Agrippina's order, the serpent's skin was enclosed in a bracelet that the young Lucius wore on his right arm.

In AD 47, Crispus died. At his funeral, a rumour spread that Agrippina had poisoned Crispus to gain his estate. After being widowed a second time, Agrippina was left very wealthy. Later that year, Messalina and Britannicus attended the performance of the Troy Pageant at the Secular Games, where Agrippina was also present with Lucius. Agrippina and Lucius received greater applause from the audience than Messalina and Britannicus did. Many people began to show pity and sympathy to Agrippina, due to the unfortunate circumstances of her life.

=== Marriage to Claudius ===
Messalina was executed in AD 48 for conspiring with Gaius Silius to overthrow her husband. Around this time, Agrippina became the mistress to one of Claudius' advisers, the Greek freedman Marcus Antonius Pallas. After ending his marriage, Claudius considered remarrying for the fourth time and his advisers began discussing which noblewoman he should marry. Claudius had a reputation for being easily persuaded; but it has been suggested that the Senate may have pushed for the marriage between Agrippina and Claudius to end the feud between the Julian and Claudian branches. This feud dated back to Agrippina's mother's actions against Tiberius after the death of Germanicus. Another reason was to bring in Agrippina's son, Lucius Domitius Ahenobarbus, as a candidate for the succession. His prestige as the descendent of Augustus and Germanicus would have helped the survival of Claudius' regime.

Claudius was said to have made references to her in his speeches: "my daughter and foster child, born and bred, in my lap, so to speak". When Claudius decided to marry her, he persuaded a group of senators that the marriage should be arranged in the public interest. In Roman society, an uncle (Claudius) marrying his niece (Agrippina) was considered incestuous and immoral.

Agrippina and Claudius married on New Year's Day in AD 49 and the marriage was met with widespread disapproval. Agrippina's marriage to Claudius was not based on love, but power – possibly being a part of her plan to make her son Lucius the new emperor. Shortly after marrying Claudius, Agrippina eliminated her rival Lollia Paulina by persuading Claudius to charge Paulina with allegations of black magic use. Claudius stipulated that Paulina did not receive a hearing and her property was confiscated. She left Italy, but Agrippina was unsatisfied. Allegedly on Agrippina's orders, a tribune forced Lollia Paulina to commit suicide.

In the months leading up to her marriage to Claudius, Agrippina's maternal second cousin, the praetor Lucius Junius Silanus Torquatus, was betrothed to Claudius' daughter Claudia Octavia. This betrothal was broken off in AD 48, when Agrippina, scheming with the consul Lucius Vitellius the Elder, the father of the future emperor Aulus Vitellius, falsely accused Silanus of incest with his sister Junia Calvina. Agrippina did this hoping to secure a marriage between Octavia and her son. Consequently, Claudius broke off the engagement and forced Silanus to resign from public office.

Silanus committed suicide on the day that Agrippina married her uncle, and Calvina was exiled from Italy in early AD 49. Towards the end of AD 54, Agrippina was accused of the murder of Silanus' eldest brother Marcus Junius Silanus Torquatus without Nero's knowledge, so that he would not seek revenge against her over his brother's death.

=== Empress ===
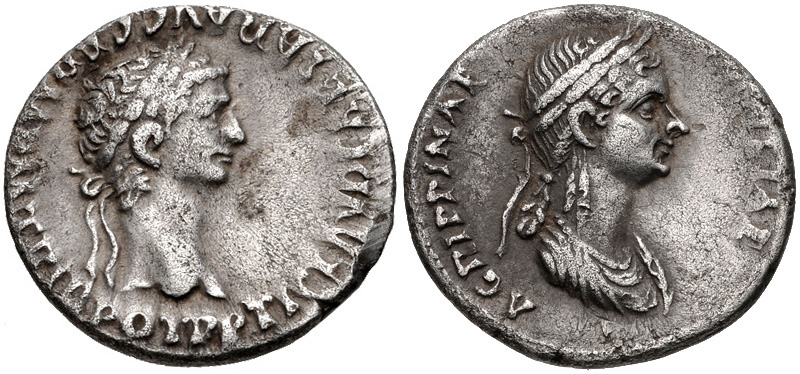
Denarius of Agrippina and Claudius, minted in AD 50–54. She was the first Roman empress to be depicted on official Roman coins in an unambiguous manner

Agrippina became empress in AD 49 upon marrying her uncle Claudius. She also became stepmother to Claudia Antonia, Claudius' daughter and only child from his second marriage to Aelia Paetina; and to the young Claudia Octavia and Britannicus, Claudius' children with Valeria Messalina. Agrippina removed or eliminated anyone from the palace or the imperial court whom she thought was loyal and dedicated to the memory of the late Messalina. She also eliminated or removed anyone whom she considered was a potential threat to her position and the future of her son, one of her victims being Lucius' second paternal aunt and Messalina's mother Domitia Lepida the Younger.

Griffin describes how Agrippina "had achieved this dominant position for her son and herself by a web of political alliances," which included Claudius chief secretary and bookkeeper Pallas, his doctor Xenophon, and Afranius Burrus: the head of the Praetorian Guard (the imperial bodyguard), who owed his promotion to Agrippina. Neither ancient nor modern historians of Rome have doubted that Agrippina had her eye on securing the throne for Nero from the very day of the marriage – if not earlier. Dio Cassius writes: "As soon as Agrippina had come to live in the palace she gained complete control over Claudius."

In AD 51, Agrippina was seated on a dais at a parade of captives when their leader the Celtic King Caratacus bowed before her with the same homage and gratitude as he accorded the emperor. In AD 50, Agrippina was granted the honorific title of Augusta. She was the third Roman woman (after Livia Drusilla and Antonia Minor) and only the second living Roman woman (the first being Livia) to receive this title.

In her capacity as Augusta, Agrippina quickly became a trusted advisor to Claudius, and by AD 54, she exerted a considerable influence over the decisions of the emperor. Statues of her were erected in many cities across the Empire and her face appeared on official Roman coins unambiguously, a first for a living empress. In the Senate, her followers were advanced with public offices and governorships. She listened to the Senate from behind the scenes. According to Cassius Dio, Agrippina was often present with Claudius in public, seated on her own platform, when he was transacting government businesses or receiving foreign ambassadors. Pliny the Elder writes that he saw her seated beside the emperor during mock naval combats, wearing a golden cloak. Tacitus claims that she boasted being a "partner in the empire". However, this privileged position caused resentment among the senatorial class and the imperial family.

Also that year, Claudius founded a Roman colony and called the colony Colonia Claudia Ara Agrippinensis or Agrippinensium, today known as Cologne, after Agrippina, who was born there. This was the only Roman colony to be named after a Roman woman. In AD 51, she was given a carpentum: a ceremonial carriage usually reserved for priests such as the Vestal Virgins and sacred statues. That same year she secured the appointment of Sextus Afranius Burrus as the head of the Praetorian Guard, replacing the previous head of the Praetorian Guard, Rufrius Crispinus.

She assisted Claudius in administering the empire and became very wealthy and powerful. Ancient sources claim that Agrippina successfully influenced Claudius into adopting her son and making him his successor. Lucius Domitius Ahenobarbus was adopted by his great maternal uncle and stepfather in AD 50. Lucius' name was changed to Nero Claudius Caesar Drusus Germanicus and he became Claudius's adopted son, heir and recognized successor. Agrippina and Claudius betrothed Nero to his step sister Claudia Octavia, and Agrippina arranged to have Seneca the Younger return from exile to tutor the future emperor. Claudius chose to adopt Nero because of his Julian and Claudian lineage.

Agrippina deprived Britannicus of his heritage and further isolated him from his father and succession for the throne in every way possible. For instance, in AD 51, Agrippina ordered the execution of Britannicus' tutor Sosibius. Sosibus had confronted her, outraged by Claudius' adoption of Nero and his choice of Nero as successor over his own son Britannicus.

Nero and Octavia were married on 9 June AD 53. Claudius later regretted marrying Agrippina and adopting Nero and began to favor Britannicus, preparing him for the throne. These actions gave Agrippina a motive to allegedly eliminate Claudius. Ancient sources say she poisoned Claudius on 13 October AD 54 with a plate of deadly mushrooms at a banquet, thus enabling Nero to quickly take the throne as emperor. Accounts vary wildly with regard to this private incident, and according to more modern sources, it is possible that Claudius died of natural causes, being 63 years old. In the aftermath of Claudius's death, Agrippina, who initially kept the death secret, tried to consolidate power by immediately ordering that the palace and the capital be sealed. After all the gates were blockaded and exit of the capital forbidden, she introduced Nero first to the soldiers and then to the senators as emperor.

== Reign of Nero ==
=== Relationship with Nero ===
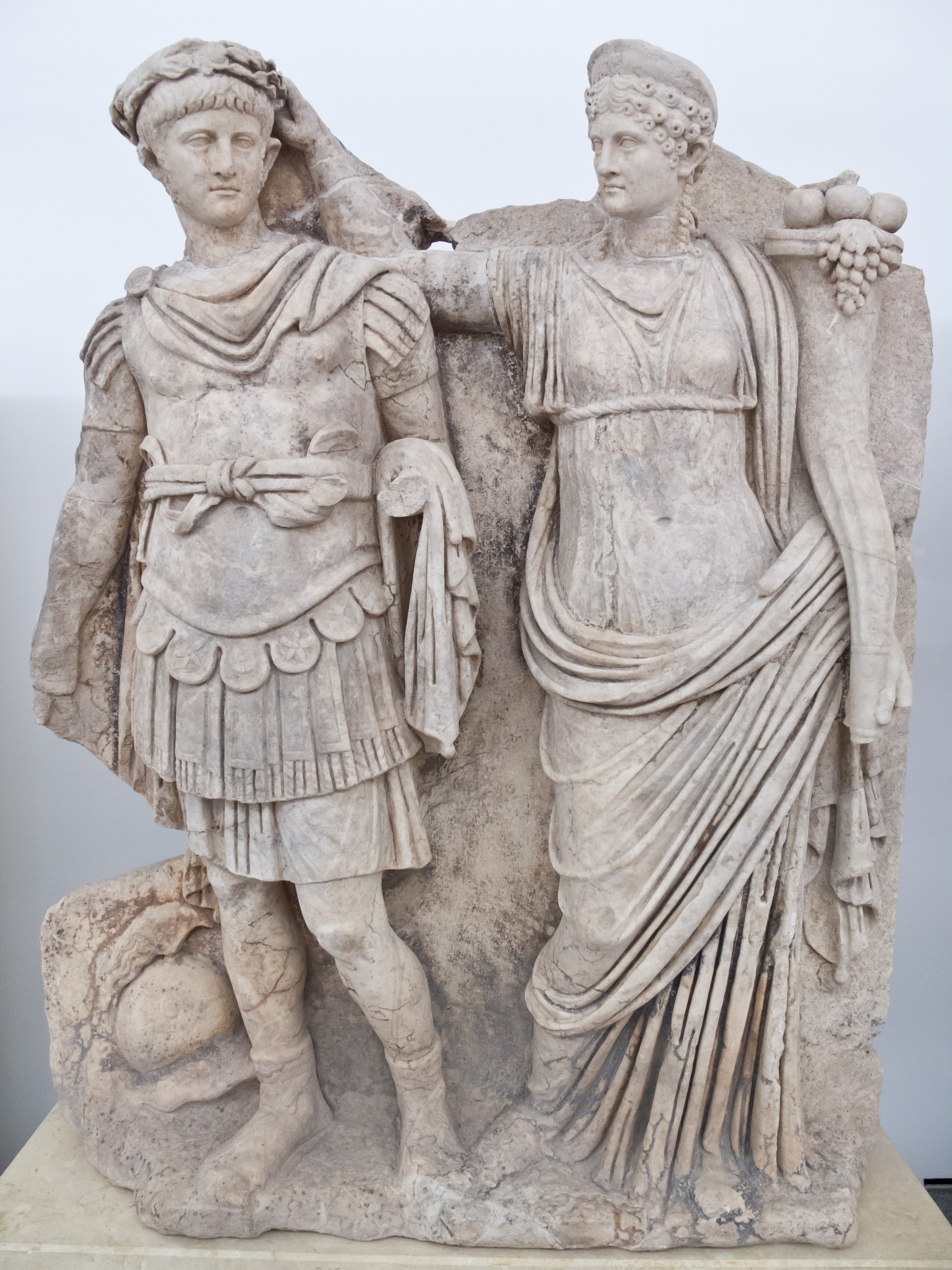
Sculpture of Agrippina crowning her young son Nero (c. AD 54–59)

Nero was raised to emperor and Agrippina was named a priestess of the cult of the deified Claudius. She now attempted to use her son's youth to participate in the rule of the Roman Empire. She enjoyed imperial prerogatives: being allowed to visit the senate meetings from behind a curtain, and appearing as a partner to her son in the official coinage and statues. The historian Tacitus depicts her as attempting a diarchy with her son when she demanded that the Praetorian Guard pledge their loyalty to her. She was also said to have tried to participate in her son's meeting with Armenian ambassadors until Seneca and Burrus persuaded Nero to stop her.

In year one of Nero's reign, Agrippina began losing influence over Nero when he began to have an affair with the freed woman Claudia Acte, which Agrippina strongly disapproved of and violently scolded him for. Agrippina began to support Britannicus in her possible attempt to make him emperor, or to threaten Nero. The panicking emperor decided on whether to eliminate his mother or his step-brother. Soon, Nero had Britannicus secretly poisoned during his own banquet in February AD 55. The power struggle between Agrippina and her son had begun.

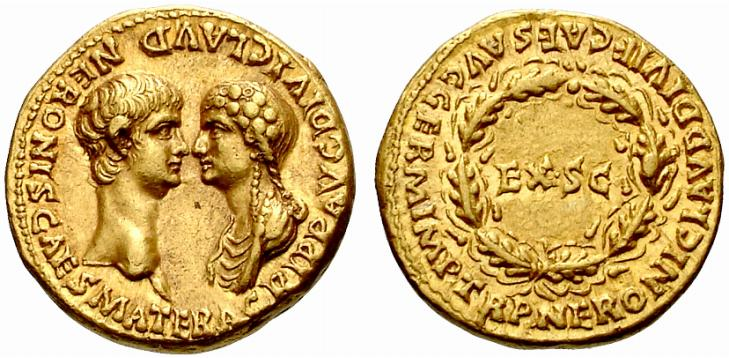
Aureus of Nero and Agrippina, minted at Lugdunum, AD 54

Between AD 56 and 58, Agrippina became very watchful and critical of her son. In AD 56, Agrippina was forced out of the palace by her son to live in the imperial residence. However, Agrippina retained some degree of influence over her son for several more years, and they are considered the best years of Nero's reign. But, as their relationship grew more hostile, Nero gradually began to deprive his mother of honours and power, and even removed her Roman and German bodyguards. Nero even threatened his mother that he would abdicate the throne and would go to live on the Greek Island of Rhodes, a place where Tiberius had lived after divorcing Julia the Elder. Pallas also was dismissed from the court. The fall of Pallas and the opposition of Burrus and Seneca to Agrippina contributed to her scaling down of authority. In mid AD 56, she was forced out of everyday and active participation in the governance of Rome.

While Agrippina lived in her residence or when she went on short visits to Rome, Nero sent people to annoy her. Although living in Misenum, she was always hailed as "Augusta", and Agrippina and Nero would see each other on short visits. In late AD 58, Agrippina and a group of soldiers and senators were accused of attempting to overthrow Nero, and it was said they planned to move with Gaius Rubellius Plautus. In addition, she revealed Nero's relationship with Poppaea Sabina.

=== Death and aftermath ===
The circumstances that surround Agrippina's death are uncertain due to historical contradictions and anti-Nero bias. However, ancient accounts agree that Nero had her murdered following an unsuccessful attempt on her life on a boat.

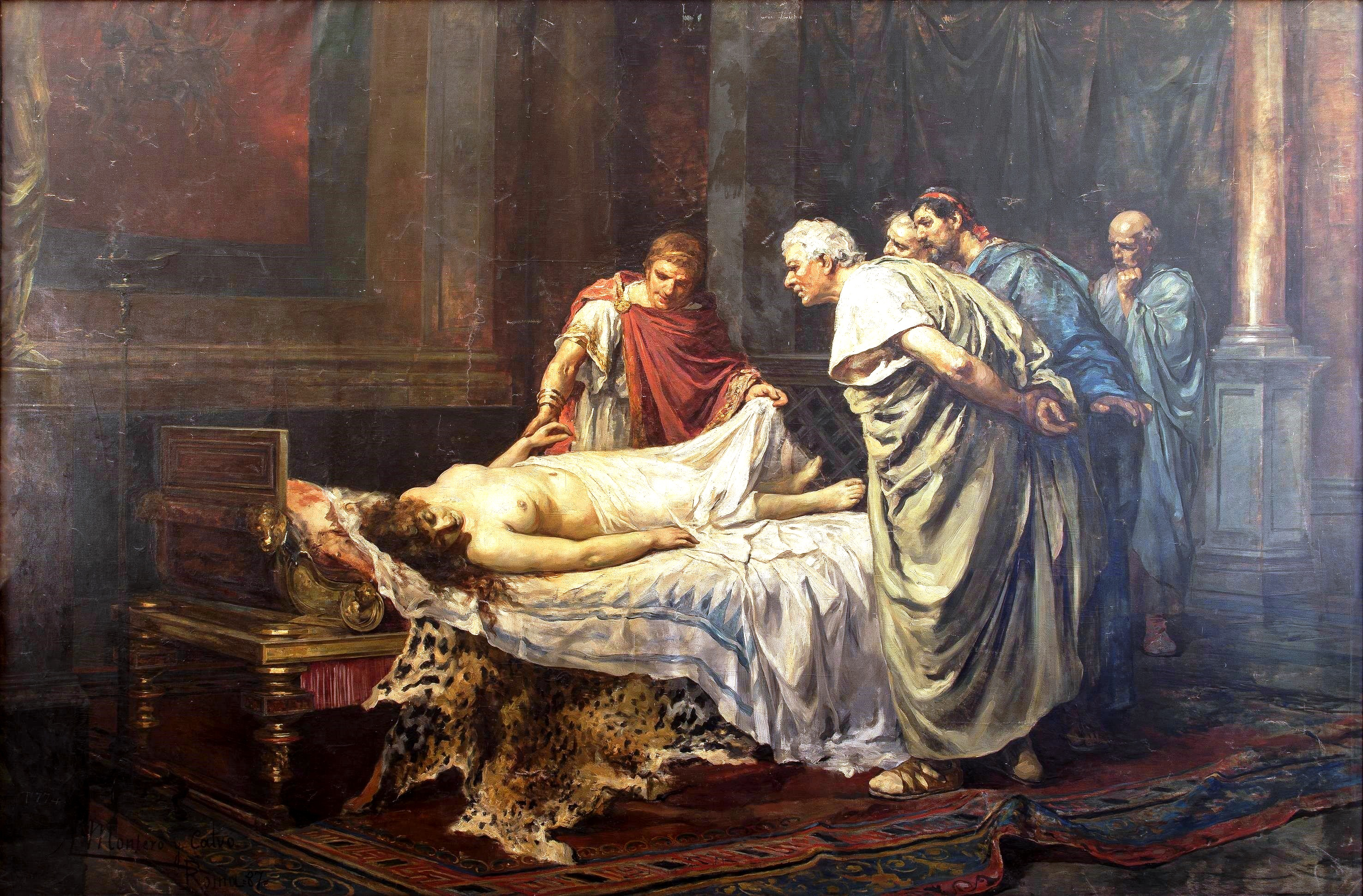
Nero before the corpse of his mother, Agrippina the Younger, by Arturo Montero y Calvo, 1887

==== Tacitus's account ====
According to Tacitus, in AD 58, Nero became involved with the noble woman Poppaea Sabina. She taunted him for being a "mummy's boy". She also convinced him of the autonomy of any other emperor. With the reasoning that a divorce from Octavia and a marriage to Poppaea was not politically feasible with Agrippina alive, Nero decided to kill Agrippina. Yet, Nero did not marry Poppaea until AD 62, calling into question this motive. Additionally, Suetonius reveals that Poppaea's husband, Otho, was not sent away by Nero until after Agrippina's death in AD 59, making it highly unlikely that already married Poppaea would be pressing Nero. Some modern historians theorise that Nero's decision to kill Agrippina was prompted by her plot to replace him with either Gaius Rubellius Plautus (Nero's maternal second cousin) or Britannicus (Claudius' biological son).

Tacitus claims that Nero considered poisoning or stabbing her, but felt these methods were too difficult and suspicious, so he settled on – after the advice of his former tutor and freedman Anicetus – building a self-sinking boat. Though aware of the plot, Agrippina embarked on this boat and was nearly crushed by a collapsing lead ceiling only to be saved by the side of a couch breaking the ceiling's fall. Though the collapsing ceiling missed Agrippina, it crushed her attendant who was outside by the helm.

The boat failed to sink as a result of the collapse of the lead ceiling, so the crew then sank the boat, but Agrippina swam to shore. Her friend Acerronia Polla was attacked by oarsmen while still in the water, and was either bludgeoned to death or drowned, since she was exclaiming that she was Agrippina, in the hope of being saved. Agrippina was met at the shore by crowds of admirers. News of Agrippina's survival reached Nero so he asked Seneca and Burrus for the advice. After a moment of silence, they recommended Anicetus to carry out the act, since the Praetorians were loyal to the children of Germanicus. So Nero sent Anicetus, the trierach Herculeius, and the marine centurion Obaritus, as well as an "armed and menacing column" to kill her.

After surrounding the villa, which scared away Agrippina's supporters, they eventually made their way to the bedroom. After the last slave girl departed her side, (whom she asked "Are you too deserting me?"), Agrippina was surrounded in her bed and struck in the head with a cudgel, before proffering her womb, crying out "Stab my belly!" and finally dying after experiencing many fatal wounds to that area.

==== Suetonius's account ====
Suetonius says that Agrippina's "over-watchful" and "over-critical" eye that she kept over Nero drove him to murder her. After months of attempting to humiliate her by depriving her of her power, honour, and bodyguards, he also expelled her from the Palatine Hill, followed by the people he sent to "pester" her with lawsuits and "jeers and catcalls".

When he eventually turned to murder, he first tried poison, three times in fact. She prevented her death by taking the antidote in advance. Afterwards, he rigged up a machine in her room which would drop her ceiling tiles onto her as she slept, but she once again escaped death after she received word of the plan. Nero's final plan was to get her in a boat which would collapse and sink.

He sent her a friendly letter asking to reconcile and inviting her to celebrate the Quinquatrus at Baiae with him. He arranged an "accidental" collision between her galley and one of his captains. When returning home, he offered her his collapsible boat, as opposed to her damaged galley.

The day after the boat sank, Nero received word of her survival from her freedman Agermus. Panicking, Nero ordered a guard to "surreptitiously" drop a blade behind Agermus and Nero immediately had him arrested on a charge of attempted murder. Nero ordered the assassination of Agrippina. He made it look as if Agrippina had committed suicide after her plot to kill Nero had been uncovered.

Suetonius says that after Agrippina's death, Nero examined Agrippina's corpse and discussed her good and bad points. Nero also believed Agrippina would haunt him after her death.

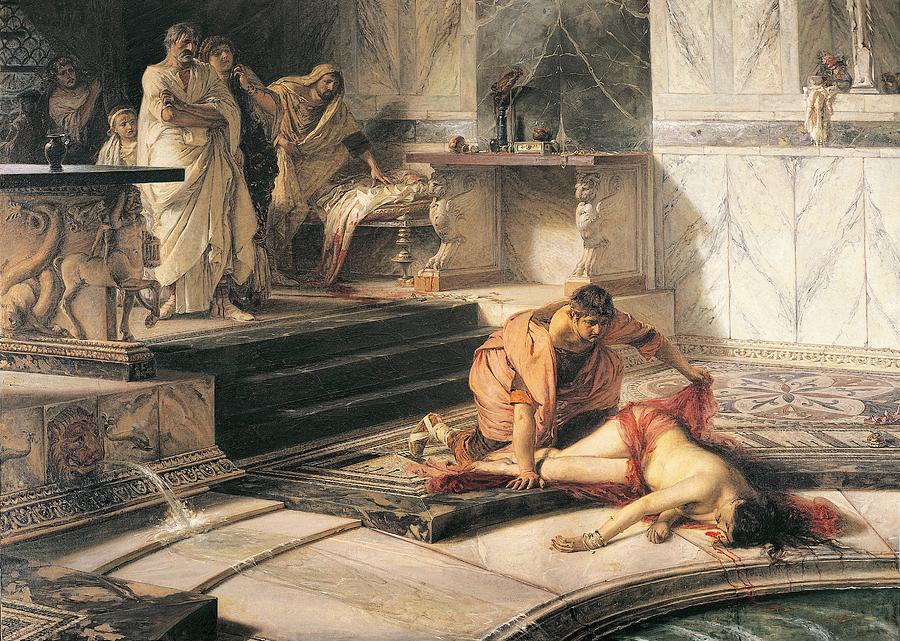
Nero and Agrippina, painting by Antonio Rizzi

==== Cassius Dio's account ====
The tale of Cassius Dio is also somewhat different. It starts again with Poppaea and Seneca as the motive behind the murder. Nero designed a ship that would open at the bottom while at sea. Then he pretended to reconcile with Agrippina and put her aboard on the vessel. Once the bottom of the ship opened up, she fell into the water. However, the sailors ended up killing Acerronia Polla instead and Agrippina swam to shore. Pretending to ignore the conspiracy, she sent Nero a letter informing of her well-being, so Nero sent Anicetus to kill her. Her reputed last words, uttered as the assassin was about to strike, were "Strike here, Anicetus, strike here, for this bore Nero".

Nero then told the Senate that Agrippina had plotted to kill him and committed suicide.

==== Burial ====
After Agrippina's death, Nero viewed her corpse and, according to some, commented how beautiful she was. Her body was cremated that night on a dining couch. At his mother's funeral, Nero was witless, speechless and rather scared. When the news spread that Agrippina had died, the Roman army, senate, and various people sent him letters of congratulations that he had been saved from his mother's plots.

==== Aftermath ====
During the remainder of Nero's reign, Agrippina's grave was not covered or enclosed. Her household later on gave her a modest tomb in Misenum. Nero would have his mother's death on his conscience. He felt so guilty he would sometimes have nightmares of her, even seeing his mother's ghost and getting Persian magicians to ask her for forgiveness. Years before she died, Agrippina had visited astrologers to ask about her son's future. The astrologers had rather accurately predicted that her son would become emperor and would kill her. She replied, "Let him kill me, provided he becomes emperor," according to Tacitus.

===== Agrippina's alleged victims =====
- 47
  - Passienus Crispus: Agrippina's 2nd husband, poisoned (Suet.).
- 49
  - Lollia Paulina: as she was a rival for Claudius' hand in marriage as proposed by the freedman Callistus (Tac. & Dio).
  - Lucius Silanus: betrothed to Octavia, Claudius' daughter, before his marriage of Agrippina. He committed suicide on their wedding day.
  - Sosibius: Britannicus' tutor, executed for plotting against Nero.
  - Calpurnia: banished (Tac.) and/or executed (Dio) because Claudius had commented on her beauty.
- 53
  - Statilius Taurus: forced to commit suicide because Agrippina wanted his gardens (Tac.).
- 54
  - Claudius: her husband, poisoned (Tac., Sen., Juv., Suet., Dio).
  - Domitia Lepida: mother of Messalina, executed (Tac.).
  - Marcus Junius Silanus: a potential rival to Nero, poisoned (Pliny, Tac., Dio).
  - Cadius Rufus: executed on the charge of extortion.
  - Tiberius Claudius Narcissus: Because of the competition with Agrippina.
- 55
  - Britannicus: Claudius' son, poisoned (Juv.).
  - Junia Silana: Agrippina's friend turned enemy. Unsuccessfully accused Agrippina of conspiracy against Nero, and was exiled (Tac.).

== Legacy and cultural references ==
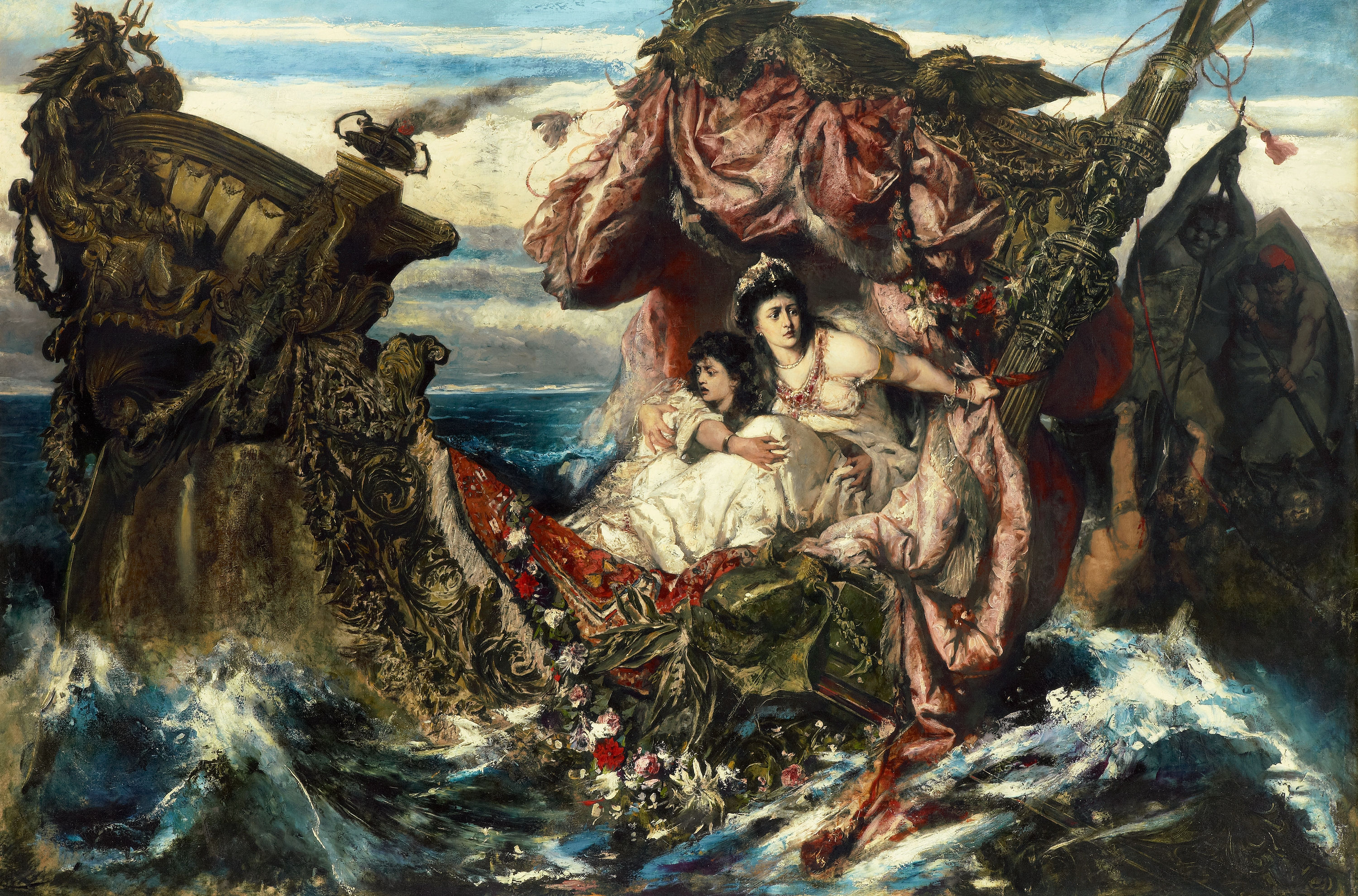
Gustav Wertheimer: The Shipwreck of Agrippina (1874)

=== Memoirs ===
Agrippina left memoirs of her life and the misfortunes of her family, which Tacitus used when writing his Annals, but they have not survived.

Tacitus explicitly cites Agrippina’s memoirs in Annals 4.53 as a primary account of her father Germanicus’s life and death, suggesting that the work included personal and political insights into the Julio-Claudian dynasty. Scholars interpret the existence of her memoirs as evidence of Agrippina’s political self-awareness and her attempt to shape her historical legacy—an unusual endeavor for a Roman woman of her time. The loss of the memoirs represents a significant gap in understanding the internal dynamics of the imperial household, especially from a female perspective.

=== In music and literature ===
She is remembered in De Mulieribus Claris, a collection of biographies of historical and mythological women by the Florentine author Giovanni Boccaccio, composed in 1361–62. It is notable as the first collection devoted exclusively to biographies of women in western literature.

- Octavia, a Roman tragedy written during the Flavian period
- Agrippina: Trauerspiel (1665), a German baroque tragedy by Daniel Casper von Lohenstein
- G.F. Handel's 1709 opera Agrippina with a libretto by Vincenzo Grimani
- Claudius the God by Robert Graves, where she is an important character
- Empress of Rome (1978), a novel by Robert DeMaria (Vineyard Press edition, 2001, ISBN 1-930067-05-4)
- Agrippina is considered to be the founder of Cologne and is still symbolised there today by the robe of the virgin of the Cologne triumvirate. In the sculpture programme of the Cologne town hall tower, a figure by Heribert Calleen was dedicated to Agrippina on the ground floor.

=== In film, television, and radio ===
- The 1911 Italian film Agrippina
- Mio Figlio Nerone (1956) played by Gloria Swanson
- I, Claudius (1976) played by Barbara Young (here called Agrippinilla).
- Caligula (1979) and also Messalina, Messalina (1977) played by Lori Wagner.
- Caligula and Messalina (1981) played by Françoise Blanchard.
- A.D. (1985 miniseries) played by Ava Gardner.
- Boudica (2003) played by Frances Barber.
- Imperium: Nero (2005) played by Laura Morante.
- Ancients Behaving Badly (2009), History Channel documentary. Episode Nero.
- Roman Empire (2016), Netflix, played by Teressa Liane.
- Agrippina the Younger was portrayed by Betty Lou Gerson in the August 31, 1953, episode of the CBS radio program Crime Classics that was entitled "Your Loving Son, Nero." The episode chronicles the killing of Agrippina by her son Nero who was portrayed by William Conrad.
- Horrible Histories – The Movie (2019) Agrippina is portrayed by Kim Catrall

== Historiography ==
=== Ancient ===
Most ancient Roman sources are quite critical of Agrippina the Younger. Tacitus considered her vicious and had a strong disposition against her. Other sources are Suetonius and Cassius Dio.

=== Modern ===
- Barrett, Anthony A., Agrippina: Sex, Power and Politics in the Early Roman Empire, Yale University Press, New Haven, 1996.
- Guglielmo Ferrero, The Women of the Caesars (1911)
- L. Foubert, Agrippina. Keizerin van Rome, Leuven, 2006.
- Annelise Freisenbruch, The first ladies of Rome
- Girod, Virginie, Agrippine, sexe, crimes et pouvoir dans la Rome impériale , Paris, Tallandier, 2015, (in French).
- Godolphin, F. R. B. (1934). "A Note on the Marriage of Claudius and Agrippina". Classical Philology. 29 (2): 143–145. doi:10.1086/361706. S2CID 162288546.
- Graves, Robert. Claudius, the god and his wife Messalina: the troublesome reign of Tiberius Claudius Caesar, Emperor of the Romans (born B.C. 10, died A.D. 54), as described by himself: also his murder at the hands of the notorious Agrippina (mother of the Emperor Nero) and his subsequent deification, as described by others. OCLC 178197.
- Grimm-Samuel, Veronika (1991). "On the Mushroom that Deified the Emperor Claudius". The Classical Quarterly. 41: 178–182. doi:10.1017/S0009838800003657. S2CID 170941059.
- E. Groag, A. Stein, L. Petersen, Prosopographia Imperii Romani saeculi I, II et III, Berlin, 1933
- Donna Hurley, Agrippina the Younger (Wife of Claudius).
- McDaniel, Walton Brooks (1910). "Bauli the Scene of the Murder of Agrippina". The Classical Quarterly. 4 (2): 96–102. doi:10.1017/S0009838800018814. S2CID 170137862.
- Minaud, Gérard, Les vies de 12 femmes d'empereur romain – Devoirs, Intrigues & Voluptés , Paris, L'Harmattan, 2012, ch. 3, La vie d'Agrippine, femme de Claude, pp. 65–96, (in French).
- Rogers, Robert Samuel (1931). "The Conspiracy of Agrippina". Transactions and Proceedings of the American Philological Association. 62: 141–168. doi:10.2307/282970. JSTOR 282970.
- H. H. Scullard, From the Gracchi to Nero: History of Rome from 133 B.C. to A.D. 68, London, 1982^{5}
- Trier, Marcus; Naumann-Steckner, Friederike (eds) (2015). Agrippina. Kaiserin aus Köln [Agrippina. Empress from Cologne]. Cologne: Römisch-Germanisches Museum, ISBN 978-3-00-051497-5.
- Wood, Susan (1995). "Diva Drusilla Panthea and the Sisters of Caligula". American Journal of Archaeology. 99 (3): 457–482. doi:10.2307/506945. JSTOR 506945. S2CID 191386576.

== See also ==
- List of unsolved murders

== Notes ==
- Boccaccio, Giovanni (2003). Famous Women. I Tatti Renaissance Library. Vol. 1. Translated by Virginia Brown. Cambridge, MA: Harvard University Press. ISBN 0-674-01130-9.
- Tacitus, Annales xii.1–10, 64–69, xiv.1–9
- Suetonius, De vita Caesarum – Claudius v.44 and Nero vi.5.3, 28.2, 34.1–4
