= Livia (mother of Cato) =

Mother of Cato the Younger (c. 120–c. 92 BC)

- Known for: Mother of Cato and Servilia
- Spouse(s): Quintus Servilius Caepio; Marcus Porcius Cato
- Children: Servilia; Servilia Minor; Gnaeus Servilius Caepio; Porcia; Cato the Younger
- Parents: Marcus Livius Drusus (father); Cornelia (mother)

Livia Drusa (c. 120 BC – c. 92 BC) was a Roman matron. She was the daughter of Marcus Livius Drusus, consul in 112 BC, and sister of Marcus Livius Drusus, tribune of the plebs in 91 BC. She was the mother of Cato the Younger, and grandmother of Marcus Junius Brutus, through her oldest daughter Servilia.

== Life and family ==
Livia's father died in 108 BC, and she passed into the care of her brother, the younger Livius Drusus. About 106, Drusus arranged for her to marry his friend, Quintus Servilius Caepio. They had three children:

- Servilia, born before 100 BC, married Marcus Junius Brutus, and was the mother of Brutus, the tyrannicide. She was the mistress of Caesar, for which reason Caesar was rumoured to be Brutus' father. (Note: This rumour is not credited by historians, since Caesar was only fifteen years old when Brutus was born.)
- Servilia Minor, born circa 99 BC, the second wife of Lucius Licinius Lucullus, consul in 74 BC.
- Gnaeus Servilius Caepio, born circa 98 BC, a military tribune during the Third Servile War.

Livia and Caepio must have divorced about 98 BC, for reasons not stated by any ancient historian; (Note: At one time it was commonly believed that Caepio was Livia's second husband, as he survived her. But from chronology, Manutius demonstrated that Caepio must have been her first husband, since her daughter, Servilia, was the mother of Brutus, who was born in 85 BC, and must therefore have been several years older than her half-brother, the younger Cato, who was born in 95. However, no ancient source explicitly states that Livia and Caepio were divorced.) but Pliny the Elder reports that Caepio and Drusus had fallen out over the sale of a ring for which each was bidding at auction. Livia then married Marcus Porcius Cato, a grandson of Cato the Elder. They had two children:

- Porcia, born circa 96 BC, married Lucius Domitius Ahenobarbus, consul in 54 BC.
- Marcus Porcius Cato Uticensis, or Cato the Younger, born 95 BC, a statesman, orator, and political opponent of Caesar.

Cato and Livia both died in the late 90s BC, and their children were raised in the household of Livia's brother, Marcus Livius Drusus.

== Family ==
Brutus family tree

Salonia (2) | Cato the Elder | Licinia (1)
Marcus Porcius Cato Salonianus | Marcus Porcius Cato Licinianus | Marcus Livius Drusus
Marcus Porcius Cato (2) | Livia | Quintus Servilius Caepio (1) | Marcus Livius Drusus
Atilia (1) | Cato the Younger | Marcus Livius Drusus Claudianus, adopted son
Marcus Junius Brutus (1) | Servilia, mistress of Julius Caesar (see AUGUSTUS below) | Decimus Junius Silanus (2) | Servilia | Gnaeus Servilius Caepio | Lucius Appuleius SATURNINUS
Marcus Porcius Cato | Porcia | Marcus Junius Brutus† | Junia Prima | Junia Tertia | Gaius Cassius Longinus x | Marcus Aemilius Lepidus (consul 78 BC) | Appuleia, daughter of SATURNINUS
Junia Secunda | Marcus Aemilius Lepidus (triumvir) | Lucius Aemilius Paullus (consul 50 BC)
Descendant of POMPEY MAGNUS and Lucius Cornelius SULLA | son (perhaps Quintus Aemilius Lepdius?) | Marcus Aemilius Lepidus Minor (the Younger) | Servilia Isaurica, daughter of Junia Prima (see above) and Publius Servilius Isauricus | Emperor AUGUSTUS (possibly, see JULIO-CLAUDIANS for descendants) | Paullus Aemilius Lepidus | Cornelia, daughter of Gnaeus Cornelius Lentulus Marcellinus and Scribonia, wife of AUGUSTUS and mother of Julia the Elder
Manius Aemilius Lepidus | Aemilia Lepida II (also engaged to Lucius Caesar, see JULIO-CLAUDIANS and AUGUSTUS) | Publius Sulpicius Quirinius (of the Sulpicia gens, related to GALBA below) | Lucius Aemilius Paullus (consul 1) | Julia the Younger, daughter of Julia the Elder and Marcus Vispanius Agrippa, see AUGUSTUS and Cornelia above | Marcus Aemilius Lepidus (consul 6 AD)
daughter (perhaps known as Aemilia Lepida?)
Aemilia Lepida | Servius Sulpicius GALBA | Mamercus Aemilius Scaurus (of the Aemilia gens, related to the Lepidae) | Marcus Junius Silanus Torquatus (of the Junia gens, related to BRUTUS, see above) | Aemilia Lepida | CLAUDIUS (see AUGUSTUS above and JULIO-CLAUDIANS) | Lucius Vitellius (consul 34) | Livilla, daughter of Drusus the Elder and sister of Germanicus and CLAUDIUS, aunt of Drusus Caesar (see JULIO-CLAUDIANS and to the right) | Lucius Aelius Sejanus, the almost emperor | Aemilia Lepida | Drusus Caesar, son of Agrippina the Elder, daughter of Julia the Elder (see AUGUSTUS and Julia the Younger above and see JULIO-CLAUDIANS)
Gaius Cassius Longinus (descended from or related to GAIUS CASSIUS LONGINUS, see above) | Junia Lepida | Junia Calvina | Lucius Vitellius (consul 48) | Aulus VITELLIUS (for Otho's relation, in terms of the Year of the Four Emperors, he married Poppaea Sabina, who married NERO, see AUGUSTUS and CLAUDIUS above)
Cassia Longina | Gnaeus Domitius Corbulo, brother of Milona, wife of CALIGULA, see JULIO-CLAUDIANS and see above
Lucius Aelius Lamia Plautius Aelianus | Domitia Longina | Domitian, see FLAVIANS and VESPASIAN
Plautia (possibly existed, although unsure, but if so, then her brother is Lucius Fundanius Lamia Aelianus, father of Lucius Plautius Lamia Silvanus, alleged ancestor of Fabia Orestilla, wife of Gordian I, see GORDIANS) | Lucius Ceionius Commodus
Lucius Aelius Caesar | Marcus Aurelius (see NERVA-ANTONINES)
Lucius Verus (for further relations, see NERVA-ANTONINES) | Lucilla

(1): 1st spouse
(2): 2nd spouse
†: assassin of Caesar

== In fiction ==
Livia Drusa appears as a major character in the first two books of Colleen McCullough's Masters of Rome series. In The First Man in Rome, her brother coerces her into marrying Caepio, whom she dislikes. In The Grass Crown, McCullough depicts Livia's relationship with Cato as having begun before her divorce from Caepio and makes Caepio's youngest son (his only son and heir, in this fictional account) the natural son of Cato.

== See also ==
- Livia gens

== Bibliography ==
- Marcus Tullius Cicero, Brutus, Epistulae ad Atticum, Pro Milone.
- Gaius Sallustius Crispus (Sallust), Bellum Catilinae (The Conspiracy of Catiline).
- Titus Livius (Livy), History of Rome.
- Valerius Maximus, Factorum ac Dictorum Memorabilium (Memorable Facts and Sayings).
- Gaius Plinius Secundus (Pliny the Elder), Historia Naturalis (Natural History).
- Plutarchus, Lives of the Noble Greeks and Romans.
- Sextus Aurelius Victor, De Viris Illustribus (On Famous Men).
- Paulus Manutius, Ad Ciceronis de Finibus (Commentary on Cicero's De Finibus Bonorum et Malorum), Venice (1541).
- Wilhelm Drumann, Geschichte Roms in seinem Übergang von der republikanischen zur monarchischen Verfassung, oder: Pompeius, Caesar, Cicero und ihre Zeitgenossen, Königsberg (1834–1844).
- Emilio Gabba, Republican Rome, the Army, and the Allies, Berkley (1976).
- Helena Stegman, "Livia", in Brill's New Pauly.
