= Servilia (wife of Lucullus) =

Second wife of Roman politician and general Lucullus

Servilia, also known as Servilia Minor or Servilia the Younger, was the second wife of Roman politician and general Lucullus.

== Biography ==
=== Early life ===
There is some debate as to who her father was. Older authors who follow Plutarch deem her to be the daughter of Quintus Servilius Caepio and Livia, thus the younger full sister of Servilia Major and Gnaeus Servilius Caepio and half-sister to Cato the Younger and Porcia. Some modern historians such as Susan Treggiari tend to believe that she was actually the daughter of Gnaeus Servilius Caepio, thus a niece of Cato; but this is not universally accepted, Judith P. Hallett has argued that is implausible that the younger Caepio (who was born in 98 BC) would have married so young and sired a daughter fast enough that she would be old enough to marry Lucullus in 66 BC.

The historian Edward Courtney identified her as the Servilia who was married to Quintus Lutatius Catulus, but that woman was more likely her aunt, also named Servilia.

=== Marriage ===
Lucullus married her on his return from the Third Mithridatic War around 66 BC, after divorcing his first wife Claudia. Servilia bore him a son whose name is uncertain. She was unfaithful to her husband with his enemy Gaius Memmius. Lucullus, after putting up with her conduct for some time out of regard to Cato the Younger at length divorced her. On the outbreak of the civil war in 49 BC, she accompanied Cato, with her child, to Sicily, and thence to the Roman province Asia. Cato left her behind in Rhodes, while he went to join Pompey.

== Family ==
Brutus family tree

Salonia (2)	Cato the Elder	Licinia (1)
Marcus Porcius Cato Salonianus	Marcus Porcius Cato Licinianus	Marcus Livius Drusus
Marcus Porcius Cato (2)	Livia	Quintus Servilius Caepio (1)	Marcus Livius Drusus
Atilia (1)	Cato the Younger	Marcus Livius Drusus Claudianus, adopted son
Marcus Junius Brutus (1)	Servilia, mistress of Julius Caesar (see AUGUSTUS below)	Decimus Junius Silanus (2)	Servilia	Gnaeus Servilius Caepio	Lucius Appuleius SATURNINUS
Marcus Porcius Cato	Porcia	Marcus Junius Brutus†	Junia Prima	Junia Tertia	Gaius Cassius Longinus x	Marcus Aemilius Lepidus (consul 78 BC)	Appuleia, daughter of SATURNINUS
Junia Secunda	Marcus Aemilius Lepidus (triumvir)	Lucius Aemilius Paullus (consul 50 BC)
Descendant of POMPEY MAGNUS and Lucius Cornelius SULLA	son (perhaps Quintus Aemilius Lepdius?)	Marcus Aemilius Lepidus Minor (the Younger)	Servilia Isaurica, daughter of Junia Prima (see above) and Publius Servilius Isauricus	Emperor AUGUSTUS (possibly, see JULIO-CLAUDIANS for descendants)	Paullus Aemilius Lepidus	Cornelia, daughter of Gnaeus Cornelius Lentulus Marcellinus and Scribonia, wife of AUGUSTUS and mother of Julia the Elder
Manius Aemilius Lepidus	Aemilia Lepida II (also engaged to Lucius Caesar, see JULIO-CLAUDIANS and AUGUSTUS)	Publius Sulpicius Quirinius (of the Sulpicia gens, related to GALBA below)	Lucius Aemilius Paullus (consul 1)	Julia the Younger, daughter of Julia the Elder and Marcus Vispanius Agrippa, see AUGUSTUS and Cornelia above	Marcus Aemilius Lepidus (consul 6 AD)
daughter (perhaps known as Aemilia Lepida?)
Aemilia Lepida	Servius Sulpicius GALBA	Mamercus Aemilius Scaurus (of the Aemilia gens, related to the Lepidae)	Marcus Junius Silanus Torquatus (of the Junia gens, related to BRUTUS, see above)	Aemilia Lepida	CLAUDIUS (see AUGUSTUS above and JULIO-CLAUDIANS)	Lucius Vitellius (consul 34)	Livilla, daughter of Drusus the Elder and sister of Germanicus and CLAUDIUS, aunt of Drusus Caesar (see JULIO-CLAUDIANS and to the right)	Lucius Aelius Sejanus, the almost emperor	Aemilia Lepida	Drusus Caesar, son of Agrippina the Elder, daughter of Julia the Elder (see AUGUSTUS and Julia the Younger above and see JULIO-CLAUDIANS)
Gaius Cassius Longinus (descended from or related to GAIUS CASSIUS LONGINUS, see above)	Junia Lepida	Junia Calvina	Lucius Vitellius (consul 48)	Aulus VITELLIUS (for Otho's relation, in terms of the Year of the Four Emperors, he married Poppaea Sabina, who married NERO, see AUGUSTUS and CLAUDIUS above)
Cassia Longina	Gnaeus Domitius Corbulo, brother of Milona, wife of CALIGULA, see JULIO-CLAUDIANS and see above
Lucius Aelius Lamia Plautius Aelianus	Domitia Longina	Domitian, see FLAVIANS and VESPASIAN
Plautia (possibly existed, although unsure, but if so, then her brother is Lucius Fundanius Lamia Aelianus, father of Lucius Plautius Lamia Silvanus, alleged ancestor of Fabia Orestilla, wife of Gordian I, see GORDIANS)	Lucius Ceionius Commodus
Lucius Aelius Caesar	Marcus Aurelius (see NERVA-ANTONINES)
Lucius Verus (for further relations, see NERVA-ANTONINES)	Lucilla

(1): 1st spouse
(2): 2nd spouse
†: assassin of Caesar

== Cultural depictions ==
In Colleen McCullough's Masters of Rome series Servilia is called "Servililla" or just "Lilla" and is depicted as having been married to her cousin Drusus before marrying Lucullus, it is stated that Drusus divorced her for infidelity.

== See also ==
- Servilia gens
- Women in ancient Rome
