= Marcus Junius Brutus (tribune 83 BC) =

Roman politician and soldier

Marcus Junius Brutus (died 77 BC) was a plebeian tribune of the Roman Republic in 83 BC and the founder of the colony in Capua. He was an associate of Marcus Aemilius Lepidus, who led a revolt against the senate after the death of Sulla. He was captured by Pompey and treacherously executed. He was the father of a homonymous son, who assassinated Julius Caesar in 44.

== Biography ==
He served as tribune of the plebs in 83 BC. During his year, he passed a bill establishing a colony at Capua. François Hinard, in Les proscriptions de Rome républicaine, argues that this Brutus was proscribed in the Sullan proscriptions but survived through the dictatorship by taking refuge in Gaul.

In 77 BC, Brutus was stationed, probably as a legate, under Lepidus in Cisalpine Gaul. He was allied with Marcus Aemilius Lepidus, who as consul was agitating against Sulla's constitutional settlement, advocating for the victims of the proscriptions, and opposed a state funeral for Sulla. Lepidus turned to violence and raised an army against his consular colleague Quintus Lutatius Catulus when Catulus successfully blocked his proposals. There is no evidence that he held the praetorship.

Lepidus' army was defeated outside of Rome by Catulus' forces. Some sources assert that Pompey or both Catulus and Pompey were responsible, but the most reliable narratives mention Catulus only. Brutus was stationed at Mutina, where he defended the stronghold against Pompey, who had been sent by the senate to dislodge him. He withstood Pompey's attacks for some time, but was eventually surrendered – his troops either turned on him or he surrendered of his own accord – after which he was allowed to go free. Following this, he went to the town of Regium Lepidi, where he was murdered by Pompey's close ally Geminius. According to Plutarch,

For Brutus, whether he himself betrayed his army, or whether his army changed sides and betrayed him, put himself in the hands of Pompey, and receiving an escort of horsemen, retired to a little town upon the Po. Here, after a single day had passed, he was slain by Geminius, who was sent by Pompey to do the deed.

Pompey forwarded to Rome the news of his surrender and execution. The senate blamed Pompey for the perfidious act. John Leach, in his biography of Pompey, defends his subject by arguing that Brutus "presumably began to whip up further support for Lepidus (the name of the town suggests that there were hereditary clients of his there)" and so Pompey was "forced" to send Geminius to Regium Lepidi to recapture and execute him. The incident would later be used as anti-Pompeian propaganda to brand the general as a "teenaged butcher".

Brutus is quoted by Cicero, who says he was well skilled in public and private law.

== Family ==
He was the first husband to Servilia, the elder half-sister of Cato the Younger. His homonymous son by Servilia is the Marcus Junius Brutus who was one of the chief assassins of Julius Caesar. The assassin was adopted by one of his maternal relatives, becoming Quintus Servilius Caepio Brutus; if this Brutus was proscribed, the adoption would have had the effect of lifting any civic disabilities – persons proscribed and their heirs were barred from seeking political office at Rome – that transmitted to his son.

Brutus family tree

Salonia (2)	Cato the Elder	Licinia (1)
Marcus Porcius Cato Salonianus	Marcus Porcius Cato Licinianus	Marcus Livius Drusus
Marcus Porcius Cato (2)	Livia	Quintus Servilius Caepio (1)	Marcus Livius Drusus
Atilia (1)	Cato the Younger	Marcus Livius Drusus Claudianus, adopted son
Marcus Junius Brutus (1)	Servilia, mistress of Julius Caesar (see AUGUSTUS below)	Decimus Junius Silanus (2)	Servilia	Gnaeus Servilius Caepio	Lucius Appuleius SATURNINUS
Marcus Porcius Cato	Porcia	Marcus Junius Brutus†	Junia Prima	Junia Tertia	Gaius Cassius Longinus x	Marcus Aemilius Lepidus (consul 78 BC)	Appuleia, daughter of SATURNINUS
Junia Secunda	Marcus Aemilius Lepidus (triumvir)	Lucius Aemilius Paullus (consul 50 BC)
Descendant of POMPEY MAGNUS and Lucius Cornelius SULLA	son (perhaps Quintus Aemilius Lepdius?)	Marcus Aemilius Lepidus Minor (the Younger)	Servilia Isaurica, daughter of Junia Prima (see above) and Publius Servilius Isauricus	Emperor AUGUSTUS (possibly, see JULIO-CLAUDIANS for descendants)	Paullus Aemilius Lepidus	Cornelia, daughter of Gnaeus Cornelius Lentulus Marcellinus and Scribonia, wife of AUGUSTUS and mother of Julia the Elder
Manius Aemilius Lepidus	Aemilia Lepida II (also engaged to Lucius Caesar, see JULIO-CLAUDIANS and AUGUSTUS)	Publius Sulpicius Quirinius (of the Sulpicia gens, related to GALBA below)	Lucius Aemilius Paullus (consul 1)	Julia the Younger, daughter of Julia the Elder and Marcus Vispanius Agrippa, see AUGUSTUS and Cornelia above	Marcus Aemilius Lepidus (consul 6 AD)
daughter (perhaps known as Aemilia Lepida?)
Aemilia Lepida	Servius Sulpicius GALBA	Mamercus Aemilius Scaurus (of the Aemilia gens, related to the Lepidae)	Marcus Junius Silanus Torquatus (of the Junia gens, related to BRUTUS, see above)	Aemilia Lepida	CLAUDIUS (see AUGUSTUS above and JULIO-CLAUDIANS)	Lucius Vitellius (consul 34)	Livilla, daughter of Drusus the Elder and sister of Germanicus and CLAUDIUS, aunt of Drusus Caesar (see JULIO-CLAUDIANS and to the right)	Lucius Aelius Sejanus, the almost emperor	Aemilia Lepida	Drusus Caesar, son of Agrippina the Elder, daughter of Julia the Elder (see AUGUSTUS and Julia the Younger above and see JULIO-CLAUDIANS)
Gaius Cassius Longinus (descended from or related to GAIUS CASSIUS LONGINUS, see above)	Junia Lepida	Junia Calvina	Lucius Vitellius (consul 48)	Aulus VITELLIUS (for Otho's relation, in terms of the Year of the Four Emperors, he married Poppaea Sabina, who married NERO, see AUGUSTUS and CLAUDIUS above)
Cassia Longina	Gnaeus Domitius Corbulo, brother of Milona, wife of CALIGULA, see JULIO-CLAUDIANS and see above
Lucius Aelius Lamia Plautius Aelianus	Domitia Longina	Domitian, see FLAVIANS and VESPASIAN
Plautia (possibly existed, although unsure, but if so, then her brother is Lucius Fundanius Lamia Aelianus, father of Lucius Plautius Lamia Silvanus, alleged ancestor of Fabia Orestilla, wife of Gordian I, see GORDIANS)	Lucius Ceionius Commodus
Lucius Aelius Caesar	Marcus Aurelius (see NERVA-ANTONINES)
Lucius Verus (for further relations, see NERVA-ANTONINES)	Lucilla

(1): 1st spouse
(2): 2nd spouse
†: assassin of Caesar

== See also ==
- Junia gens
- Servilia, his wife
- Marcus Junius Brutus, his homonymous son

== Bibliography ==
- Badian, Ernst (2012). "Iunius Brutus, Marcus". In Hornblower, Simon; et al. (eds.). The Oxford Classical Dictionary (4th ed.). Oxford University Press. doi:10.1093/acrefore/9780199381135.013.3439. ISBN 978-0-19-954556-8. OCLC 959667246.
- Broughton, Thomas Robert Shannon (1952). The Magistrates of the Roman Republic. Vol. II. New York: American Philological Association.
- Broughton, Thomas Robert Shannon (1986). The Magistrates of the Roman Republic. Vol. III. Atlanta: Scholars Press.
- Flower, Harriet (2010). Roman Republics. Princeton University Press. ISBN 978-0-691-14043-8. LCCN 2009004551.
- Golden, Gregory K (2013). Crisis Management During the Roman Republic. Cambridge University Press. ISBN 978-1-107-05590-2. OCLC 842919750.
- Hinard, François (1985). Les proscriptions de Rome républicaine (in French). Ecole français du Rome. ISBN 2-7283-0094-1.
- Plutarch (1917) [2nd century AD]. "Life of Pompey". Parallel Lives. Translated by Perrin, Bernadotte. Loeb Classical Library – via LacusCurtius.
- Tempest, Kathryn (2017). Brutus: The Noble Conspirator. London: Yale University Press. ISBN 978-0-300-18009-1.
