= Marcus Porcius Cato =

Marcus Porcius Cato can refer to:

- Cato the Elder (consul 195 BC; called "Censorinus"), politician renowned for austerity and author
- Cato the Younger (praetor 54 BC; called "Uticensis"), opponent of Caesar
- Marcus Porcius Cato (consul 118 BC)
- Marcus Porcius Cato (consul 36)
- Marcus Porcius Cato (father of Cato the Younger)
- Marcus Porcius Cato (son of Cato the Younger)
- Marcus Porcius Cato Licinianus (praetor 152 BC)
- Marcus Porcius Cato Salonianus (praetor c. 113 BC)
