= Salonia =

Second wife of Cato the Elder

Salonia was the daughter of a Roman slave and freedman who lived during the mid-2nd century BC, and who was the second wife of Cato the Elder. She was the young daughter of the freedman Salonius who was an under-secretary to Cato the Elder. She is sometimes erroneously equated with the enslaved woman who, following the death of his first wife, secretly visited Cato in his bed.

Cato's son Marcus Porcius Cato Licinianus and his wife disapproved of Cato sleeping with an enslaved girl so Cato decided to marry in order to solve the problem. His choice of Salonia seems rather random, yet also reveals Cato's relationship with his freed clients. However, when Licinianus found out about it he complained about having a stepmother, which was viewed unfavorably in Rome due to inheritance laws. Cato replied that he loved his son, and for that reason, wished to have more sons like him.

In 154 BC, Salonia gave birth to Marcus Porcius Cato Salonianus who was only five when his father died. Through her son, Salonia was grandmother of Lucius Porcius Cato and Marcus Porcius Cato, the great-grandmother of Cato the Younger.

Brutus family tree

Salonia (2)	Cato the Elder	Licinia (1)
Marcus Porcius Cato Salonianus	Marcus Porcius Cato Licinianus	Marcus Livius Drusus
Marcus Porcius Cato (2)	Livia	Quintus Servilius Caepio (1)	Marcus Livius Drusus
Atilia (1)	Cato the Younger	Marcus Livius Drusus Claudianus, adopted son
Marcus Junius Brutus (1)	Servilia, mistress of Julius Caesar (see AUGUSTUS below)	Decimus Junius Silanus (2)	Servilia	Gnaeus Servilius Caepio	Lucius Appuleius SATURNINUS
Marcus Porcius Cato	Porcia	Marcus Junius Brutus†	Junia Prima	Junia Tertia	Gaius Cassius Longinus x	Marcus Aemilius Lepidus (consul 78 BC)	Appuleia, daughter of SATURNINUS
Junia Secunda	Marcus Aemilius Lepidus (triumvir)	Lucius Aemilius Paullus (consul 50 BC)
Descendant of POMPEY MAGNUS and Lucius Cornelius SULLA	son (perhaps Quintus Aemilius Lepdius?)	Marcus Aemilius Lepidus Minor (the Younger)	Servilia Isaurica, daughter of Junia Prima (see above) and Publius Servilius Isauricus	Emperor AUGUSTUS (possibly, see JULIO-CLAUDIANS for descendants)	Paullus Aemilius Lepidus	Cornelia, daughter of Gnaeus Cornelius Lentulus Marcellinus and Scribonia, wife of AUGUSTUS and mother of Julia the Elder
Manius Aemilius Lepidus	Aemilia Lepida II (also engaged to Lucius Caesar, see JULIO-CLAUDIANS and AUGUSTUS)	Publius Sulpicius Quirinius (of the Sulpicia gens, related to GALBA below)	Lucius Aemilius Paullus (consul 1)	Julia the Younger, daughter of Julia the Elder and Marcus Vispanius Agrippa, see AUGUSTUS and Cornelia above	Marcus Aemilius Lepidus (consul 6 AD)
daughter (perhaps known as Aemilia Lepida?)
Aemilia Lepida	Servius Sulpicius GALBA	Mamercus Aemilius Scaurus (of the Aemilia gens, related to the Lepidae)	Marcus Junius Silanus Torquatus (of the Junia gens, related to BRUTUS, see above)	Aemilia Lepida	CLAUDIUS (see AUGUSTUS above and JULIO-CLAUDIANS)	Lucius Vitellius (consul 34)	Livilla, daughter of Drusus the Elder and sister of Germanicus and CLAUDIUS, aunt of Drusus Caesar (see JULIO-CLAUDIANS and to the right)	Lucius Aelius Sejanus, the almost emperor	Aemilia Lepida	Drusus Caesar, son of Agrippina the Elder, daughter of Julia the Elder (see AUGUSTUS and Julia the Younger above and see JULIO-CLAUDIANS)
Gaius Cassius Longinus (descended from or related to GAIUS CASSIUS LONGINUS, see above)	Junia Lepida	Junia Calvina	Lucius Vitellius (consul 48)	Aulus VITELLIUS (for Otho's relation, in terms of the Year of the Four Emperors, he married Poppaea Sabina, who married NERO, see AUGUSTUS and CLAUDIUS above)
Cassia Longina	Gnaeus Domitius Corbulo, brother of Milona, wife of CALIGULA, see JULIO-CLAUDIANS and see above
Lucius Aelius Lamia Plautius Aelianus	Domitia Longina	Domitian, see FLAVIANS and VESPASIAN
Plautia (possibly existed, although unsure, but if so, then her brother is Lucius Fundanius Lamia Aelianus, father of Lucius Plautius Lamia Silvanus, alleged ancestor of Fabia Orestilla, wife of Gordian I, see GORDIANS)	Lucius Ceionius Commodus
Lucius Aelius Caesar	Marcus Aurelius (see NERVA-ANTONINES)
Lucius Verus (for further relations, see NERVA-ANTONINES)	Lucilla

(1): 1st spouse
(2): 2nd spouse
†: assassin of Caesar
