= Decimus Junius Silanus (consul) =

Consul in 62 BC, husband of Servilia

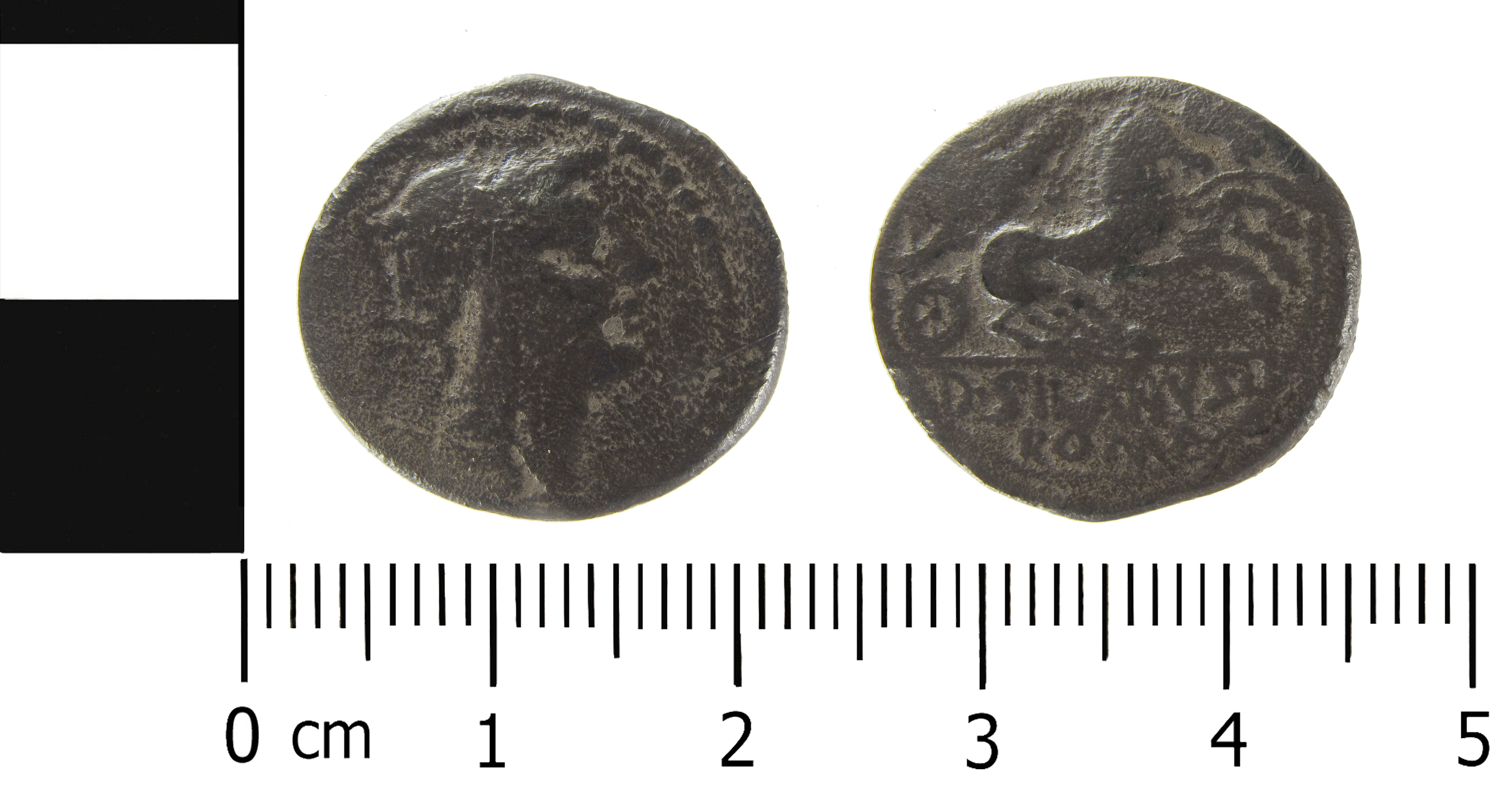
A coin featuring the consul

Decimus Junius Silanus (107 – after 62 BC) was a consul of the Roman Republic. He may have been the son of Marcus Junius Silanus, consul in 109 BC. He was the stepfather of Marcus Junius Brutus, having married Brutus' mother, Servilia.

== Biography ==
=== Early life ===
Born in 107 BC, Decimus Junius M. f. D. n. Silanus was the son of a Marcus Junius Silanus; presumably Decimus had an elder brother named Marcus, but he might have died young.

=== Marriage ===
Silanus married Servilia after her first husband died. Together they had four children, a son, Marcus Junius Silanus, and three daughters, Junia Prima, Junia Secunda, and Junia Tertia. Silanus may also have been the father of a Decimus Junius Silanus.

=== Political career ===
He was aedile in 70 BC, but he lost the election to be a consul of 63. He was successful the following year, and so in consequence of his being consul designatus he was first asked for his opinion by Cicero in the debate in the senate on the punishment of the Catilinarian conspirators. At first he spoke in favor of "the supreme penalty" for the conspirators, but when Julius Caesar suggested life imprisonment, Silanus insisted that was what he had really meant. As such, it was left to Cato the Younger to force through the decision to actually execute the conspirators.

He was consul in 62 BC with Lucius Licinius Murena. They proposed the lex Junia Licinia, which provided that a rogatio (a proposed law) must be promulgated three nundinae, or market-intervals, before the people voted on it. It also confirmed the lex Caecilia Didia.

== Family ==
Brutus family tree

Salonia (2)	Cato the Elder	Licinia (1)
Marcus Porcius Cato Salonianus	Marcus Porcius Cato Licinianus	Marcus Livius Drusus
Marcus Porcius Cato (2)	Livia	Quintus Servilius Caepio (1)	Marcus Livius Drusus
Atilia (1)	Cato the Younger	Marcus Livius Drusus Claudianus, adopted son
Marcus Junius Brutus (1)	Servilia, mistress of Julius Caesar (see AUGUSTUS below)	Decimus Junius Silanus (2)	Servilia	Gnaeus Servilius Caepio	Lucius Appuleius SATURNINUS
Marcus Porcius Cato	Porcia	Marcus Junius Brutus†	Junia Prima	Junia Tertia	Gaius Cassius Longinus x	Marcus Aemilius Lepidus (consul 78 BC)	Appuleia, daughter of SATURNINUS
Junia Secunda	Marcus Aemilius Lepidus (triumvir)	Lucius Aemilius Paullus (consul 50 BC)
Descendant of POMPEY MAGNUS and Lucius Cornelius SULLA	son (perhaps Quintus Aemilius Lepdius?)	Marcus Aemilius Lepidus Minor (the Younger)	Servilia Isaurica, daughter of Junia Prima (see above) and Publius Servilius Isauricus	Emperor AUGUSTUS (possibly, see JULIO-CLAUDIANS for descendants)	Paullus Aemilius Lepidus	Cornelia, daughter of Gnaeus Cornelius Lentulus Marcellinus and Scribonia, wife of AUGUSTUS and mother of Julia the Elder
Manius Aemilius Lepidus	Aemilia Lepida II (also engaged to Lucius Caesar, see JULIO-CLAUDIANS and AUGUSTUS)	Publius Sulpicius Quirinius (of the Sulpicia gens, related to GALBA below)	Lucius Aemilius Paullus (consul 1)	Julia the Younger, daughter of Julia the Elder and Marcus Vispanius Agrippa, see AUGUSTUS and Cornelia above	Marcus Aemilius Lepidus (consul 6 AD)
daughter (perhaps known as Aemilia Lepida?)
Aemilia Lepida	Servius Sulpicius GALBA	Mamercus Aemilius Scaurus (of the Aemilia gens, related to the Lepidae)	Marcus Junius Silanus Torquatus (of the Junia gens, related to BRUTUS, see above)	Aemilia Lepida	CLAUDIUS (see AUGUSTUS above and JULIO-CLAUDIANS)	Lucius Vitellius (consul 34)	Livilla, daughter of Drusus the Elder and sister of Germanicus and CLAUDIUS, aunt of Drusus Caesar (see JULIO-CLAUDIANS and to the right)	Lucius Aelius Sejanus, the almost emperor	Aemilia Lepida	Drusus Caesar, son of Agrippina the Elder, daughter of Julia the Elder (see AUGUSTUS and Julia the Younger above and see JULIO-CLAUDIANS)
Gaius Cassius Longinus (descended from or related to GAIUS CASSIUS LONGINUS, see above)	Junia Lepida	Junia Calvina	Lucius Vitellius (consul 48)	Aulus VITELLIUS (for Otho's relation, in terms of the Year of the Four Emperors, he married Poppaea Sabina, who married NERO, see AUGUSTUS and CLAUDIUS above)
Cassia Longina	Gnaeus Domitius Corbulo, brother of Milona, wife of CALIGULA, see JULIO-CLAUDIANS and see above
Lucius Aelius Lamia Plautius Aelianus	Domitia Longina	Domitian, see FLAVIANS and VESPASIAN
Plautia (possibly existed, although unsure, but if so, then her brother is Lucius Fundanius Lamia Aelianus, father of Lucius Plautius Lamia Silvanus, alleged ancestor of Fabia Orestilla, wife of Gordian I, see GORDIANS)	Lucius Ceionius Commodus
Lucius Aelius Caesar	Marcus Aurelius (see NERVA-ANTONINES)
Lucius Verus (for further relations, see NERVA-ANTONINES)	Lucilla

(1): 1st spouse
(2): 2nd spouse
†: assassin of Caesar

== Footnotes ==
Political offices
Preceded by M. Tullius Cicero; G. Antonius Hybrida	Roman consul 62 BC; With: Lucius Licinius Murena	Succeeded by M. Pupius Piso Frugi; M. Valerius Messalla Niger
