= Marcus Porcius Cato Licinianus =

Son of Cato the Elder (191–152 BCE)

Marcus Porcius Cato Licinianus (191–152 BC) was son of Cato the Elder by his first wife Licinia, and thence called Licinianus, to distinguish him from his half-brother, Marcus Salonianus, the son of Salonia. He was distinguished as a jurist.

== Biography ==
=== Early life and education ===
His father paid great attention to his education, physical as well as mental, and studied to preserve his young mind from every immoral taint. He was taught to ride, swim, wrestle, fence, and, perhaps to the injury of a weak constitution, was exposed to vicissitudes of cold and heat in order to harden his frame. His father would not allow his learned slave Chilo to superintend the education of his son, lest the boy should acquire slavish notions or habits, but wrote lessons of history for him in large letters with his own hand, and afterwards composed a kind of Encyclopaedia for his use. Under such tuition, the young Cato became a wise and virtuous man.

=== Life as a soldier ===
He first entered life as a soldier, in 173 BC and served in Liguria under the consul Marcus Laenas. The legion to which he belonged having been disbanded, he took the military oath a second time, by the advice of his father, in order to qualify himself legally to fight against the enemy. In 168 BC, he fought against Perseus of Macedon at the Battle of Pydna under the consul Lucius Macedonicus, whose daughter, Aemilia Tertia, he afterwards married. He distinguished himself in the battle by his personal prowess in a combat in which he first lost and finally recovered his sword. The details of this combat are related with variations by several authors. He returned to the troops on his own side covered with wounds, and was received with applause by the consul, who gave him his discharge in order that he might get cured. Here again his father seems to have cautioned him to take no further part in battle, as after his discharge he was no longer a soldier.

=== Life as a jurist ===
Henceforward he appears to have devoted himself to the practice of the law, in which he attained considerable eminence. In the obscure and corrupt fragment of Sextus Pomponius' de Origine Juris, after mentioning Sextus and Publius Aelius and Publius Atilius, the author proceeds to speak of the two Catos. This passage seems to speak of a Cato before the Censor, but Pomponius wrote in paragraphs, devoting one to each succession of jurists, and the word Deinde commences that of the Catos, though the Censor had been mentioned by anticipation at the end of the preceding paragraph. From the Catos, father and son, the subsequent jurists traced their succession. Apollinaris Sulpicius, in that passage of Aulus Gellius which is the principal authority with respect to the genealogy of the Cato family, speaks of the son as having written “egregios de juris disciplina libros”. Festus (under Mundus) cites the commentarii juris civilis of Cato, probably the son, and Julius Paullus cites Cato's 15th book. Cicero censures Cato and Brutus for introducing in their published responsa the names of the persons who consulted them. Celsus cites an opinion of Cato concerning the intercalary month, and the regula or sententia Catoniana is frequently mentioned in the Digest. The regula Catoniana was a celebrated rule of Roman law to the effect, that a legacy should never be valid unless it would have been valid if the testator had died immediately after he had made his will. This rule (which had several exceptions) was a particular case of a more general maxim: “Quod initio non valet, id tractu temporis non potest convalescere”. The greater celebrity of the son as a jurist, and the language of the citations from Cato, render it likely that the son is the Cato of the Digest. From the manner in which Cato is mentioned in the Institutes,—“Apud Catonem bene scriptum refert antiquitas,”—it may be inferred, that he was known only at second hand in the time of Justinian.

He died when praetor designatus, around 152 BC, a few years before his father, who bore his loss with resignation, and, on the ground of poverty, gave him a frugal funeral.

His wife was the Aemilia who was the daughter of Lucius Aemilius Paullus Macedonicus (consul in 182 BC) and granddaughter of Lucius Aemilius Paullus (consul in 219). His elder son was the consul of 118 BC, Marcus Cato. He was also the father of the Gaius Cato who was consul in 114.

== Family ==
Brutus family tree

Salonia (2)	Cato the Elder	Licinia (1)
Marcus Porcius Cato Salonianus	Marcus Porcius Cato Licinianus	Marcus Livius Drusus
Marcus Porcius Cato (2)	Livia	Quintus Servilius Caepio (1)	Marcus Livius Drusus
Atilia (1)	Cato the Younger	Marcus Livius Drusus Claudianus, adopted son
Marcus Junius Brutus (1)	Servilia, mistress of Julius Caesar (see AUGUSTUS below)	Decimus Junius Silanus (2)	Servilia	Gnaeus Servilius Caepio	Lucius Appuleius SATURNINUS
Marcus Porcius Cato	Porcia	Marcus Junius Brutus†	Junia Prima	Junia Tertia	Gaius Cassius Longinus x	Marcus Aemilius Lepidus (consul 78 BC)	Appuleia, daughter of SATURNINUS
Junia Secunda	Marcus Aemilius Lepidus (triumvir)	Lucius Aemilius Paullus (consul 50 BC)
Descendant of POMPEY MAGNUS and Lucius Cornelius SULLA	son (perhaps Quintus Aemilius Lepdius?)	Marcus Aemilius Lepidus Minor (the Younger)	Servilia Isaurica, daughter of Junia Prima (see above) and Publius Servilius Isauricus	Emperor AUGUSTUS (possibly, see JULIO-CLAUDIANS for descendants)	Paullus Aemilius Lepidus	Cornelia, daughter of Gnaeus Cornelius Lentulus Marcellinus and Scribonia, wife of AUGUSTUS and mother of Julia the Elder
Manius Aemilius Lepidus	Aemilia Lepida II (also engaged to Lucius Caesar, see JULIO-CLAUDIANS and AUGUSTUS)	Publius Sulpicius Quirinius (of the Sulpicia gens, related to GALBA below)	Lucius Aemilius Paullus (consul 1)	Julia the Younger, daughter of Julia the Elder and Marcus Vispanius Agrippa, see AUGUSTUS and Cornelia above	Marcus Aemilius Lepidus (consul 6 AD)
daughter (perhaps known as Aemilia Lepida?)
Aemilia Lepida	Servius Sulpicius GALBA	Mamercus Aemilius Scaurus (of the Aemilia gens, related to the Lepidae)	Marcus Junius Silanus Torquatus (of the Junia gens, related to BRUTUS, see above)	Aemilia Lepida	CLAUDIUS (see AUGUSTUS above and JULIO-CLAUDIANS)	Lucius Vitellius (consul 34)	Livilla, daughter of Drusus the Elder and sister of Germanicus and CLAUDIUS, aunt of Drusus Caesar (see JULIO-CLAUDIANS and to the right)	Lucius Aelius Sejanus, the almost emperor	Aemilia Lepida	Drusus Caesar, son of Agrippina the Elder, daughter of Julia the Elder (see AUGUSTUS and Julia the Younger above and see JULIO-CLAUDIANS)
Gaius Cassius Longinus (descended from or related to GAIUS CASSIUS LONGINUS, see above)	Junia Lepida	Junia Calvina	Lucius Vitellius (consul 48)	Aulus VITELLIUS (for Otho's relation, in terms of the Year of the Four Emperors, he married Poppaea Sabina, who married NERO, see AUGUSTUS and CLAUDIUS above)
Cassia Longina	Gnaeus Domitius Corbulo, brother of Milona, wife of CALIGULA, see JULIO-CLAUDIANS and see above
Lucius Aelius Lamia Plautius Aelianus	Domitia Longina	Domitian, see FLAVIANS and VESPASIAN
Plautia (possibly existed, although unsure, but if so, then her brother is Lucius Fundanius Lamia Aelianus, father of Lucius Plautius Lamia Silvanus, alleged ancestor of Fabia Orestilla, wife of Gordian I, see GORDIANS)	Lucius Ceionius Commodus
Lucius Aelius Caesar	Marcus Aurelius (see NERVA-ANTONINES)
Lucius Verus (for further relations, see NERVA-ANTONINES)	Lucilla

(1): 1st spouse
(2): 2nd spouse
†: assassin of Caesar
