= Junia Secunda =

Ancient Roman woman

- Born: Rome
- Died: Rome
- Known for: Daughter of Servilia, sister of Brutus
- Spouse: Lepidus
- Children: Marcus Aemilius Lepidus Minor; Quintus Aemilius Lepidus; Aemilia Lepida (possibly)
- Parents: Decimus Junius Silanus (father); Servilia (mother)

Junia, called Junia Secunda by modern historians to distinguish her from her sisters, was an ancient Roman woman who lived in the 1st century BC. She was the half-sister of Marcus Brutus, and was married to the triumvir Marcus Aemilius Lepidus.

== Biography ==
=== Early life ===
Junia Secunda was daughter of Servilia (who was the half-sister of Cato the Younger and mistress of Julius Caesar) and Decimus Junius Silanus. She was the half-sister of Marcus Junius Brutus through her mother and full sister of Marcus Junius Silanus, Junia Prima and Junia Tertia.

=== Marriage ===
She married Lepidus, who later became a member of the Second Triumvirate, alongside Mark Antony and Octavian (later Augustus). Unlike his fellow triumvirs, Lepidus remained married to the same woman throughout his life, and seems to have been devoted to Junia.

In his speeches, Cicero praised Junia as the ideal wife. In a private letter to Atticus, however, Cicero claimed that Junia was unfaithful to Lepidus, on the grounds that her portrait was seen among the chattels of a debauchee called Publius Vedius (possibly Publius Vedius Pollio), and expresses surprise that her husband and brother took no notice of her conduct. However some have argued that it was Junia Prima, rather than Junia Secunda, who had the affair with Vedius.

=== Plot against Octavian ===
After her husband was forced from power by Octavian, Junia lost much of her status. After the battle of Actium she became part of a plot to kill Octavian, formed by her son Lepidus the Younger. However it was foiled by Gaius Maecenas. Her son was executed after being sent to Octavian, who was still in the east at the time. She was summoned to follow him to appear before Octavian. Her husband had to plead with his former enemy Lucius Saenius Balbinus to grant her bail so that she could remain with him until Octavian returned.

== Family ==
Brutus family tree

Salonia (2)	Cato the Elder	Licinia (1)
Marcus Porcius Cato Salonianus	Marcus Porcius Cato Licinianus	Marcus Livius Drusus
Marcus Porcius Cato (2)	Livia	Quintus Servilius Caepio (1)	Marcus Livius Drusus
Atilia (1)	Cato the Younger	Marcus Livius Drusus Claudianus, adopted son
Marcus Junius Brutus (1)	Servilia, mistress of Julius Caesar (see AUGUSTUS below)	Decimus Junius Silanus (2)	Servilia	Gnaeus Servilius Caepio	Lucius Appuleius SATURNINUS
Marcus Porcius Cato	Porcia	Marcus Junius Brutus†	Junia Prima	Junia Tertia	Gaius Cassius Longinus x	Marcus Aemilius Lepidus (consul 78 BC)	Appuleia, daughter of SATURNINUS
Junia Secunda	Marcus Aemilius Lepidus (triumvir)	Lucius Aemilius Paullus (consul 50 BC)
Descendant of POMPEY MAGNUS and Lucius Cornelius SULLA	son (perhaps Quintus Aemilius Lepdius?)	Marcus Aemilius Lepidus Minor (the Younger)	Servilia Isaurica, daughter of Junia Prima (see above) and Publius Servilius Isauricus	Emperor AUGUSTUS (possibly, see JULIO-CLAUDIANS for descendants)	Paullus Aemilius Lepidus	Cornelia, daughter of Gnaeus Cornelius Lentulus Marcellinus and Scribonia, wife of AUGUSTUS and mother of Julia the Elder
Manius Aemilius Lepidus	Aemilia Lepida II (also engaged to Lucius Caesar, see JULIO-CLAUDIANS and AUGUSTUS)	Publius Sulpicius Quirinius (of the Sulpicia gens, related to GALBA below)	Lucius Aemilius Paullus (consul 1)	Julia the Younger, daughter of Julia the Elder and Marcus Vispanius Agrippa, see AUGUSTUS and Cornelia above	Marcus Aemilius Lepidus (consul 6 AD)
daughter (perhaps known as Aemilia Lepida?)
Aemilia Lepida	Servius Sulpicius GALBA	Mamercus Aemilius Scaurus (of the Aemilia gens, related to the Lepidae)	Marcus Junius Silanus Torquatus (of the Junia gens, related to BRUTUS, see above)	Aemilia Lepida	CLAUDIUS (see AUGUSTUS above and JULIO-CLAUDIANS)	Lucius Vitellius (consul 34)	Livilla, daughter of Drusus the Elder and sister of Germanicus and CLAUDIUS, aunt of Drusus Caesar (see JULIO-CLAUDIANS and to the right)	Lucius Aelius Sejanus, the almost emperor	Aemilia Lepida	Drusus Caesar, son of Agrippina the Elder, daughter of Julia the Elder (see AUGUSTUS and Julia the Younger above and see JULIO-CLAUDIANS)
Gaius Cassius Longinus (descended from or related to GAIUS CASSIUS LONGINUS, see above)	Junia Lepida	Junia Calvina	Lucius Vitellius (consul 48)	Aulus VITELLIUS (for Otho's relation, in terms of the Year of the Four Emperors, he married Poppaea Sabina, who married NERO, see AUGUSTUS and CLAUDIUS above)
Cassia Longina	Gnaeus Domitius Corbulo, brother of Milona, wife of CALIGULA, see JULIO-CLAUDIANS and see above
Lucius Aelius Lamia Plautius Aelianus	Domitia Longina	Domitian, see FLAVIANS and VESPASIAN
Plautia (possibly existed, although unsure, but if so, then her brother is Lucius Fundanius Lamia Aelianus, father of Lucius Plautius Lamia Silvanus, alleged ancestor of Fabia Orestilla, wife of Gordian I, see GORDIANS)	Lucius Ceionius Commodus
Lucius Aelius Caesar	Marcus Aurelius (see NERVA-ANTONINES)
Lucius Verus (for further relations, see NERVA-ANTONINES)	Lucilla

(1): 1st spouse
(2): 2nd spouse
†: assassin of Caesar
