= Marcus Porcius Cato Salonianus =

Son of Cato the Elder, magistrate (born 154)

Marcus Porcius M. f. M. n. Cato Salonianus (born c. 154 BC) was the younger son of Cato the Elder, and grandfather of Marcus Porcius Cato Uticensis, also known as "Cato the Younger".

Salonianus' father was Marcus Porcius Cato, consul in 195 BC, and censor in 184. Celebrated for his courage, austerity, and strict moral code, the elder Cato, who already had a grown son by his first wife, Licinia, took a second wife at an advanced age, choosing the daughter of his client and scribe, Salonius. He was eighty years old when his younger son was born, and since both sons bore the praenomen Marcus, they later came to be referred to as Cato Licinianus and Cato Salonianus, after their mothers.

Licinianus died soon after the birth of his younger brother, and Cato the Elder died in 149, when Salonianus was five years old. The younger Cato lived to attain the praetorship, but died during his year of office, leaving two sons, Marcus and Lucius. Both would pursue public careers, like their father and grandfather, and also like Saloninus and his brother, neither were long-lived. Marcus was tribune of the plebs, and a candidate for the praetorship at the time of his death, some time before the outbreak of the Social War, in 91 BC, while Lucius would achieve the consulship in 89 BC, only to fall in the course of the war.

By his son Marcus, Salonianus was the grandfather of Cato the Younger, a notable adherent of Stoicism, whose lifestyle emulated that of Cato the Elder. Famed for his conservative views, austerity, and stubbornness, the younger Cato served as praetor, and became a staunch supporter of Gnaeus Pompeius Magnus during the Civil War, choosing to take his own life rather than be captured by Caesar, even though he would almost certainly have been pardoned.

== Family ==
Brutus family tree

Salonia (2)	Cato the Elder	Licinia (1)
Marcus Porcius Cato Salonianus	Marcus Porcius Cato Licinianus	Marcus Livius Drusus
Marcus Porcius Cato (2)	Livia	Quintus Servilius Caepio (1)	Marcus Livius Drusus
Atilia (1)	Cato the Younger	Marcus Livius Drusus Claudianus, adopted son
Marcus Junius Brutus (1)	Servilia, mistress of Julius Caesar (see AUGUSTUS below)	Decimus Junius Silanus (2)	Servilia	Gnaeus Servilius Caepio	Lucius Appuleius SATURNINUS
Marcus Porcius Cato	Porcia	Marcus Junius Brutus†	Junia Prima	Junia Tertia	Gaius Cassius Longinus x	Marcus Aemilius Lepidus (consul 78 BC)	Appuleia, daughter of SATURNINUS
Junia Secunda	Marcus Aemilius Lepidus (triumvir)	Lucius Aemilius Paullus (consul 50 BC)
Descendant of POMPEY MAGNUS and Lucius Cornelius SULLA	son (perhaps Quintus Aemilius Lepdius?)	Marcus Aemilius Lepidus Minor (the Younger)	Servilia Isaurica, daughter of Junia Prima (see above) and Publius Servilius Isauricus	Emperor AUGUSTUS (possibly, see JULIO-CLAUDIANS for descendants)	Paullus Aemilius Lepidus	Cornelia, daughter of Gnaeus Cornelius Lentulus Marcellinus and Scribonia, wife of AUGUSTUS and mother of Julia the Elder
Manius Aemilius Lepidus	Aemilia Lepida II (also engaged to Lucius Caesar, see JULIO-CLAUDIANS and AUGUSTUS)	Publius Sulpicius Quirinius (of the Sulpicia gens, related to GALBA below)	Lucius Aemilius Paullus (consul 1)	Julia the Younger, daughter of Julia the Elder and Marcus Vispanius Agrippa, see AUGUSTUS and Cornelia above	Marcus Aemilius Lepidus (consul 6 AD)
daughter (perhaps known as Aemilia Lepida?)
Aemilia Lepida	Servius Sulpicius GALBA	Mamercus Aemilius Scaurus (of the Aemilia gens, related to the Lepidae)	Marcus Junius Silanus Torquatus (of the Junia gens, related to BRUTUS, see above)	Aemilia Lepida	CLAUDIUS (see AUGUSTUS above and JULIO-CLAUDIANS)	Lucius Vitellius (consul 34)	Livilla, daughter of Drusus the Elder and sister of Germanicus and CLAUDIUS, aunt of Drusus Caesar (see JULIO-CLAUDIANS and to the right)	Lucius Aelius Sejanus, the almost emperor	Aemilia Lepida	Drusus Caesar, son of Agrippina the Elder, daughter of Julia the Elder (see AUGUSTUS and Julia the Younger above and see JULIO-CLAUDIANS)
Gaius Cassius Longinus (descended from or related to GAIUS CASSIUS LONGINUS, see above)	Junia Lepida	Junia Calvina	Lucius Vitellius (consul 48)	Aulus VITELLIUS (for Otho's relation, in terms of the Year of the Four Emperors, he married Poppaea Sabina, who married NERO, see AUGUSTUS and CLAUDIUS above)
Cassia Longina	Gnaeus Domitius Corbulo, brother of Milona, wife of CALIGULA, see JULIO-CLAUDIANS and see above
Lucius Aelius Lamia Plautius Aelianus	Domitia Longina	Domitian, see FLAVIANS and VESPASIAN
Plautia (possibly existed, although unsure, but if so, then her brother is Lucius Fundanius Lamia Aelianus, father of Lucius Plautius Lamia Silvanus, alleged ancestor of Fabia Orestilla, wife of Gordian I, see GORDIANS)	Lucius Ceionius Commodus
Lucius Aelius Caesar	Marcus Aurelius (see NERVA-ANTONINES)
Lucius Verus (for further relations, see NERVA-ANTONINES)	Lucilla

(1): 1st spouse
(2): 2nd spouse
†: assassin of Caesar

== See also ==
- Porcia gens

== Bibliography ==
- Plutarchus, Lives of the Noble Greeks and Romans.
- Aulus Gellius, Noctes Atticae (Attic Nights).
- Dictionary of Greek and Roman Biography and Mythology, William Smith, ed., Little, Brown and Company, Boston (1849).
