= Marcus Porcius Cato (father of Cato the Younger) =

Ancient Rome politician

Marcus Porcius M. f. M. n. Cato was the father of Cato the Younger. His promising political career was cut short by his sudden death, early in the first century BC.

== Family ==
Cato was the son of Marcus Porcius Cato Salonianus, the son of Cato the Elder by his second wife, Salonia. Cato Salonianus was born in 154 BC, and lived to obtain the praetorship, but then died in office, leaving two sons, Marcus and Lucius. When Marcus was grown, he married Livia, daughter of Marcus Livius Drusus, consul in 112 BC. Livia had previously been married to Quintus Servilius Caepio, (Note: Some scholars hold that Cato was Livia's first husband, and Caepio her second; but chronology favours Livia having married Caepio first, since her grandson, Brutus, was born in 85 BC, meaning that his mother, Servilia, must have been older than her half-siblings, Marcus (born in 95) and Porcia.) and had three children: Gnaeus, Servilia, who married Marcus Junius Brutus, and Servilia Minor, wife of Lucius Licinius Lucullus. Since Caepio died during the Social War, he and Livia must have been divorced. The cause is not known, but it might have been the result of the enmity that developed between Caepio and his brother-in-law, Marcus Livius Drusus, although they had previously been close friends. Cato and Livia had a son, Marcus, born in 95 BC, and a daughter, Porcia.

Brutus family tree

Salonia (2) | Cato the Elder | Licinia (1)
Marcus Porcius Cato Salonianus | Marcus Porcius Cato Licinianus | Marcus Livius Drusus
Marcus Porcius Cato (2) | Livia | Quintus Servilius Caepio (1) | Marcus Livius Drusus
Atilia (1) | Cato the Younger | Marcus Livius Drusus Claudianus, adopted son
Marcus Junius Brutus (1) | Servilia, mistress of Julius Caesar (see AUGUSTUS below) | Decimus Junius Silanus (2) | Servilia | Gnaeus Servilius Caepio | Lucius Appuleius SATURNINUS
Marcus Porcius Cato | Porcia | Marcus Junius Brutus† | Junia Prima | Junia Tertia | Gaius Cassius Longinus x | Marcus Aemilius Lepidus (consul 78 BC) | Appuleia, daughter of SATURNINUS
Junia Secunda | Marcus Aemilius Lepidus (triumvir) | Lucius Aemilius Paullus (consul 50 BC)
Descendant of POMPEY MAGNUS and Lucius Cornelius SULLA | son (perhaps Quintus Aemilius Lepdius?) | Marcus Aemilius Lepidus Minor (the Younger) | Servilia Isaurica, daughter of Junia Prima (see above) and Publius Servilius Isauricus | Emperor AUGUSTUS (possibly, see JULIO-CLAUDIANS for descendants) | Paullus Aemilius Lepidus | Cornelia, daughter of Gnaeus Cornelius Lentulus Marcellinus and Scribonia, wife of AUGUSTUS and mother of Julia the Elder
Manius Aemilius Lepidus | Aemilia Lepida II (also engaged to Lucius Caesar, see JULIO-CLAUDIANS and AUGUSTUS) | Publius Sulpicius Quirinius (of the Sulpicia gens, related to GALBA below) | Lucius Aemilius Paullus (consul 1) | Julia the Younger, daughter of Julia the Elder and Marcus Vispanius Agrippa, see AUGUSTUS and Cornelia above | Marcus Aemilius Lepidus (consul 6 AD)
daughter (perhaps known as Aemilia Lepida?)
Aemilia Lepida | Servius Sulpicius GALBA | Mamercus Aemilius Scaurus (of the Aemilia gens, related to the Lepidae) | Marcus Junius Silanus Torquatus (of the Junia gens, related to BRUTUS, see above) | Aemilia Lepida | CLAUDIUS (see AUGUSTUS above and JULIO-CLAUDIANS) | Lucius Vitellius (consul 34) | Livilla, daughter of Drusus the Elder and sister of Germanicus and CLAUDIUS, aunt of Drusus Caesar (see JULIO-CLAUDIANS and to the right) | Lucius Aelius Sejanus, the almost emperor | Aemilia Lepida | Drusus Caesar, son of Agrippina the Elder, daughter of Julia the Elder (see AUGUSTUS and Julia the Younger above and see JULIO-CLAUDIANS)
Gaius Cassius Longinus (descended from or related to GAIUS CASSIUS LONGINUS, see above) | Junia Lepida | Junia Calvina | Lucius Vitellius (consul 48) | Aulus VITELLIUS (for Otho's relation, in terms of the Year of the Four Emperors, he married Poppaea Sabina, who married NERO, see AUGUSTUS and CLAUDIUS above)
Cassia Longina | Gnaeus Domitius Corbulo, brother of Milona, wife of CALIGULA, see JULIO-CLAUDIANS and see above
Lucius Aelius Lamia Plautius Aelianus | Domitia Longina | Domitian, see FLAVIANS and VESPASIAN
Plautia (possibly existed, although unsure, but if so, then her brother is Lucius Fundanius Lamia Aelianus, father of Lucius Plautius Lamia Silvanus, alleged ancestor of Fabia Orestilla, wife of Gordian I, see GORDIANS) | Lucius Ceionius Commodus
Lucius Aelius Caesar | Marcus Aurelius (see NERVA-ANTONINES)
Lucius Verus (for further relations, see NERVA-ANTONINES) | Lucilla

(1): 1st spouse
(2): 2nd spouse
†: assassin of Caesar

== Career ==
Cato was tribune of the plebs in an uncertain year, probably early in the first decade of the first century BC. Broughton assigns his tribunate to 99 BC, in which year the tribunes Cato and Quintus Pompeius Rufus attempted to recall Quintus Caecilius Metellus Numidicus from exile. This bill was opposed by Gaius Marius, a prominent general and rival of Numidicus, and with his support the proposal was vetoed by the tribune Publius Furius. Drumann identifies this Cato as Lucius, the brother of Marcus, but the year of his tribunate is equally uncertain.

Cicero relates an anecdote concerning a decision that Cato gave in a civil trial, relating to a vendor's duty to disclose hidden defects to a purchaser. A certain Claudius, having been ordered by the augurs to demolish his house on the Caelian Hill, because it obstructed the auspices, sold the house to the plaintiff, Calpurnius, without mentioning the demand of the augurs. When Calpurnius learned that his house was to be demolished, he brought suit against Claudius for fraud, and Cato rendered a decision in his favour, requiring Claudius to pay him damages.

== Death ==
At the time of his death, which occurred some time before the outbreak of the Social War in 91 BC, Cato was a candidate for the praetorship. Livia also died while her children were young. They were raised in the household of their uncle, Marcus Livius Drusus. Both Drusus and Caepio were killed in the Social War, as was Cato's brother, Lucius, during his consulship in 89 BC. Marcus Cato had been a friend of the general Sulla, who took an interest in his son after Cato's death. Cato's daughter, Porcia, married Lucius Domitius Ahenobarbus, who became consul in 54 BC.

== See also ==
- Porcia gens

== Bibliography ==
- Marcus Tullius Cicero, De Officiis, Epistulae ad Atticum.
- Plutarchus, Lives of the Noble Greeks and Romans.
- Aulus Gellius, Noctes Atticae (Attic Nights).
- Wilhelm Drumann, Geschichte Roms in seinem Übergang von der republikanischen zur monarchischen Verfassung, oder: Pompeius, Caesar, Cicero und ihre Zeitgenossen, Königsberg (1834–1844).
- Dictionary of Greek and Roman Biography and Mythology, William Smith, ed., Little, Brown and Company, Boston (1849).
- T. Robert S. Broughton, The Magistrates of the Roman Republic, American Philological Association (1952).
