= Servilia (mother of Brutus) =

1st-century BC Roman noblewoman and mother of Brutus

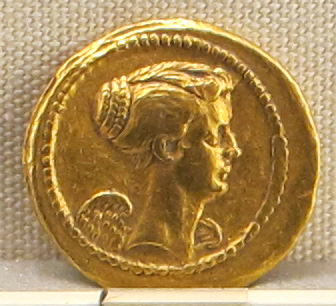
- Image of the goddess Victory on a coin of 41 BC, thought to be modelled on Servilia.
- Born: c. 100 BC
- Died: After 42 BC, probably around 27–23 BC.
- Known for: Mother of Marcus Junius Brutus; Julius Caesar's mistress
- Spouse(s): Marcus Junius Brutus; Decimus Junius Silanus
- Children: Brutus; Marcus Junius Silanus; Junia Prima; Junia Secunda; Junia Tertia
- Parent(s): Quintus Servilius Caepio and Livia

Servilia (c. 100 BC – after 42 BC) was a Roman matron from a distinguished family, the Servilii Caepiones. She was the daughter of Quintus Servilius Caepio and Livia, thus the maternal half-sister of Cato the Younger. She married Marcus Junius Brutus, with whom she had a son, the Brutus who, along with others in the Senate, assassinated Julius Caesar. After her first husband's death in 77 BC, she married Decimus Junius Silanus, and with him had a son and three daughters.

She gained fame as the mistress of Julius Caesar, whom her son Brutus and son-in-law Gaius Cassius Longinus would assassinate in 44 BC. Her affair with Caesar seems to have been publicly known in Rome at the time. Plutarch stated that she in turn was madly in love with Caesar. The relationship between the two started no later than 63 BC, although some argue it began in 59 BC, after the death of Servilia's second husband. Plutarch implied it began when they were teenagers.

== Biography ==
=== Early life ===
Servilia was a patrician who could trace her line back to Gaius Servilius Ahala, and was the eldest child of Livia and Quintus Servilius Caepio. Her parents had two other children, a younger Servilia and a Gnaeus Servilius Caepio; her father also likely had another son named Quintus Servilius Caepio from an earlier marriage. They divorced when she was three or four, and her mother then married Marcus Porcius Cato. From this union, Servilia's half-brother, Cato the Younger, and half-sister, Porcia, were born.

However, her mother and stepfather both died before 91 BC. As a result, Servilia, her younger siblings, and her half-siblings were all brought up in the house of their maternal uncle, Marcus Livius Drusus. He was assassinated during his tribunate in 91 BC, in his own atrium, when Servilia was nine. Her father was ambushed and killed in the immediately ensuing Social War, a war triggered by Drusus' assassination, mere months after her uncle's murder. After this she was probably brought up either by her other maternal uncle Mamercus Aemilius Lepidus Livianus, her maternal grandmother Cornelia or her paternal aunt Servilia. At adulthood, Servilia became legally independent and gained a considerable estate.

Servilia truly had great influence on her half-brother Cato the Younger. He was considered to be tough and wild as a child, which frames Servilia as his equal in those respects.

As a young girl belonging to Roman ruling class, Servilia would have been well educated. She likely would have been taught to read, write, sing, dance, and play an instrument. She would have read poetry, epics, and histories.

=== Marriages and children ===
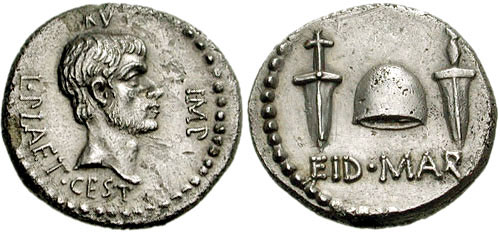
A denarius of Marcus Junius Brutus issued after the assassination of Julius Caesar, Servilia's son and lover, respectively.

At the age of 13 or 14, she married Marcus Junius Brutus in the early 80s, who later was tribune of the plebs (83 BC) and founder of a colony at Capua. They had one child, the future tyrannicide Marcus Junius Brutus, born around 85 BC. This was a profitable marriage for Brutus, who would gain fortune, stability, and political traction through Servilia. Although the elder Brutus survived Sulla's proscriptions, he was treacherously killed by Pompey after surrendering at Mutina in 77 BC. After the death of the elder Brutus, Servilia's bond with her son grew. She also arranged for her son to be adopted into her family, allowing for the name of the Servilii Caepiones to be preserved.

Servilia subsequently married Decimus Junius Silanus, by whom she had three daughters. Her daughters were all married into prominent and politically active families, Her first daughter married Publius Servilius Vatia Isauricus; her second married Marcus Aemilius Lepidus (later triumvir); and her third daughter married Gaius Cassius Longinus. Servilia was well connected and facilitated these advantageous marriages herself.

It is speculated that either soon after she married Silanus, or after the births of her daughters, Servilia's notorious affair with Caesar began. Silanus is not depicted to have been against the affair. Servilia did not remarry after the death of Silanus around 59 BC, and remained unmarried for the rest of her life. She was able to live independently as a widow, owning various estates due to inheritances from various wealthy relatives.

=== Relationship with Caesar ===
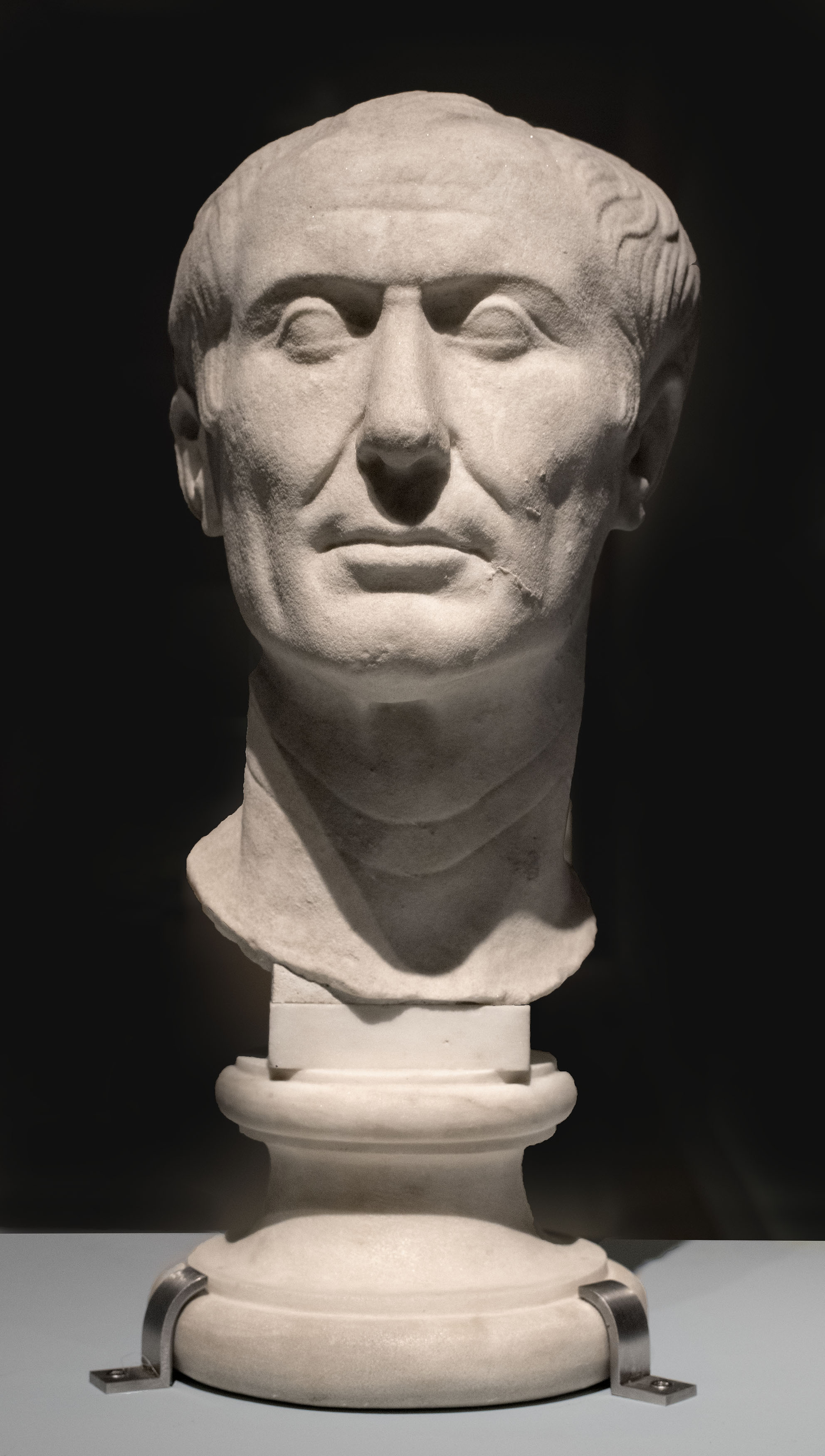
The Tusculum portrait, a contemporary Roman sculpture of Julius Caesar.

Caesar had numerous affairs with women married and unmarried, but none lasted as long, nor were they as passionate as his affair with Servilia. An intimate relationship between the two probably started in 59, after the death of Servilia's second husband. The affair was well known and Servilia suffered no damage to her reputation because of this relationship. Unlike most other aristocratic affairs, this one seemed also to have lasted over many years.

The relationship broadly is first recorded in extant sources in 63, when Servilia apparently was caught sneaking a love note to Caesar in the senate by her brother Cato. Cato was greatly displeased to find out about Caesar's correspondence with his half-sister. Modern scholars have made use of this incident to indicate the passion between Servilia and Caesar, noting that Servilia maintained long-distance contact while Caesar was away. Servilia's loyalties were torn during the Civil War, as both Cato and Brutus espoused the side of Pompey, despite the latter's role in the death of her former husband.

Plutarch only emphasized Servilia's devotion for Caesar, claiming that she was madly in love with him, but it is widely accepted that Caesar held a deep affection for Servilia. Scholars speculate that it was Caesar's affections which allowed the affair to continue for as long as it did. During his consulship in 59, Caesar supposedly presented Servilia with an outrageously expensive pearl worth some six million sesterces.

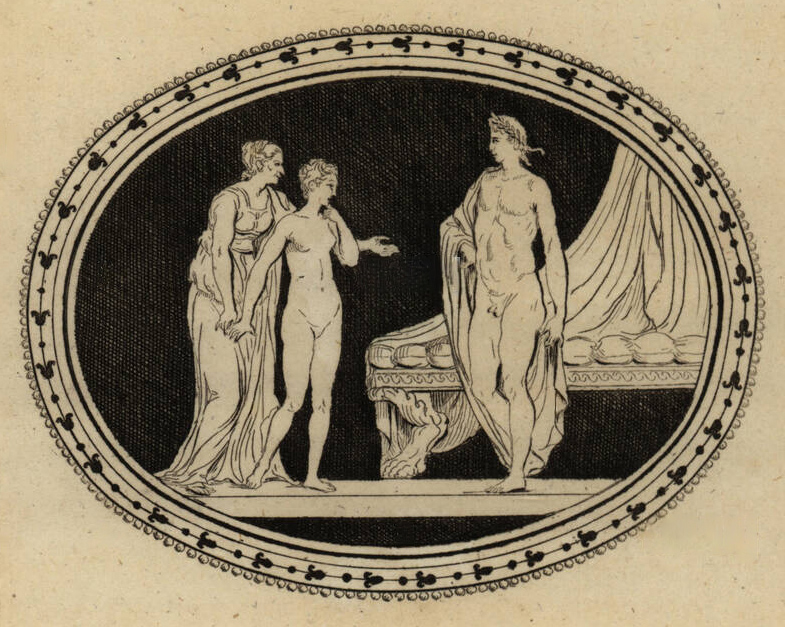
Servilia presents her daughter Junia Tertia to Caesar, illustration by Pierre-François Hugues d'Hancarville, 1780

Another popular rumor was that Servilia was prostituting her daughter Tertia to Caesar in 47 BC. At an estate auction where Caesar received several properties at a low rate to give to Servilia, Cicero remarked, "It's a better bargain than you think, for there is one-third deducted;" the Latin phrase, tertia deducta, is a pun, meaning both "a third off" and "with Tertia seduced". Some ancient sources refer to the possibility of Caesar being Brutus' real father, despite Caesar being only fifteen years old when Brutus was born. Ancient historians were sceptical of this possibility and "on the whole, scholars have rejected the possibility that Brutus was the love-child of Servilia and Caesar on the grounds of chronology". Perhaps out of a desire to avoid offending Servilia, Caesar gave orders that Brutus should not be harmed if encountered after the Pompeian defeat at Pharsalus.

When her son – Marcus Junius Brutus – divorced his wife Claudia to marry Cato's daughter Porcia in 45, she disapproved, having been instrumental in arranging the match and also disagreeing with the anti-Caesarian stance taken by her half-brother Cato. Servilia may also have been jealous of the affection that Brutus showed his new bride. Later that year, Caesar appointed her son urban praetor for 44.

=== After Caesar's death ===
After Caesar's assassination by a conspiracy which included Servilia's son – Brutus – and son-in-law – Gaius Cassius Longinus – on the Ides of March of 44 BC, the conspirators met at Servilia's house. It is unlikely she knew anything of the conspiracy, having been on good terms with Caesar until his death; regardless, she worked to protect her relatives from the ensuing political storm. Apart from Servilia, the only women in attendance were Porcia and Junia Tertia.

Servilia worked extensively in 44 BC to ensure the safety of her family both by attending senate meetings, and by contributing greatly to the discourses during their meetings. Cicero's letters detail other meetings of the senate that Servilia had called to discuss what actions should be taken which would protect her son and sons-in-law. Cicero described her as a 'nervous lady', which could be understood as politically cautious.

Servilia's opinions were often held in higher esteem than those of Cicero during meetings of the liberatores. Due to women being unable to hold office or vote, Servilia focused her political efforts on strategic marriages for her daughters and helping create a political career for her son Brutus.

Due to life-threatening unrest in the city, her son Brutus was able to get a special dispensation to leave the capital for more than 10 days, and he withdrew to one of his estates in Lanuvium, 20 miles south-east of Rome. By mid-May, Antony proposed reassigning Brutus and Cassius from their provinces to instead purchase grain in Asia and Sicily. There was a meeting at Brutus' house attended by Cicero, Brutus and Cassius (and wives), and Brutus' mother, in which Cassius announced his intention to go to Syria while Brutus wanted to return to Rome, but ended up going to Greece. His initial plan to go to Rome, however, was to put on games in early July commemorating his ancestor Lucius Junius Brutus and promoting his cause; he instead delegated the games to a friend. Servilia assisted in organising Brutus' games, in charge of decisions concerning the ceremony, finances, and senatorial contacts. Antony's proposed reassignment also was dropped by the senate; Cicero claims that it was because of some action by Servilia.

Servilia led a council meeting in July 43 to discuss the possible return of Brutus and Cassius from exile, which serves as the most explicit depiction of a woman overseeing a meeting in this period.

=== Later life ===
Despite her connections with the conspirators, Servilia escaped the purges of the Second Triumvirate unscathed due to the protection of her long-time friend Titus Pomponius Atticus. After Brutus' death, her son's ashes were sent to her by Antony from Philippi.

Very little is known about Servilia's life after the death of Brutus. She is suspected to have died a natural death between 27 and 23 BC. Her youngest daughter, Junia Tertia, out-lived Augustus and was noticed by Tacitus to have had a splendid funeral which kept the memory of Brutus and Cassius alive.

== Marriages and issue ==
- Marcus Junius Brutus
  - Marcus Junius Brutus
- Decimus Junius Silanus, the consul of 62 BC
  - Marcus Junius Silanus, the consul of 25 BC
  - Junia Prima (married Publius Servilius Isauricus)
  - Junia Secunda (married Marcus Aemilius Lepidus, future triumvir)
  - Junia Tertia (married Gaius Cassius Longinus, another prominent assassin of Julius Caesar)

Brutus family tree

Salonia (2)	Cato the Elder	Licinia (1)
Marcus Porcius Cato Salonianus	Marcus Porcius Cato Licinianus	Marcus Livius Drusus
Marcus Porcius Cato (2)	Livia	Quintus Servilius Caepio (1)	Marcus Livius Drusus
Atilia (1)	Cato the Younger	Marcus Livius Drusus Claudianus, adopted son
Marcus Junius Brutus (1)	Servilia, mistress of Julius Caesar (see AUGUSTUS below)	Decimus Junius Silanus (2)	Servilia	Gnaeus Servilius Caepio	Lucius Appuleius SATURNINUS
Marcus Porcius Cato	Porcia	Marcus Junius Brutus†	Junia Prima	Junia Tertia	Gaius Cassius Longinus x	Marcus Aemilius Lepidus (consul 78 BC)	Appuleia, daughter of SATURNINUS
Junia Secunda	Marcus Aemilius Lepidus (triumvir)	Lucius Aemilius Paullus (consul 50 BC)
Descendant of POMPEY MAGNUS and Lucius Cornelius SULLA	son (perhaps Quintus Aemilius Lepdius?)	Marcus Aemilius Lepidus Minor (the Younger)	Servilia Isaurica, daughter of Junia Prima (see above) and Publius Servilius Isauricus	Emperor AUGUSTUS (possibly, see JULIO-CLAUDIANS for descendants)	Paullus Aemilius Lepidus	Cornelia, daughter of Gnaeus Cornelius Lentulus Marcellinus and Scribonia, wife of AUGUSTUS and mother of Julia the Elder
Manius Aemilius Lepidus	Aemilia Lepida II (also engaged to Lucius Caesar, see JULIO-CLAUDIANS and AUGUSTUS)	Publius Sulpicius Quirinius (of the Sulpicia gens, related to GALBA below)	Lucius Aemilius Paullus (consul 1)	Julia the Younger, daughter of Julia the Elder and Marcus Vispanius Agrippa, see AUGUSTUS and Cornelia above	Marcus Aemilius Lepidus (consul 6 AD)
daughter (perhaps known as Aemilia Lepida?)
Aemilia Lepida	Servius Sulpicius GALBA	Mamercus Aemilius Scaurus (of the Aemilia gens, related to the Lepidae)	Marcus Junius Silanus Torquatus (of the Junia gens, related to BRUTUS, see above)	Aemilia Lepida	CLAUDIUS (see AUGUSTUS above and JULIO-CLAUDIANS)	Lucius Vitellius (consul 34)	Livilla, daughter of Drusus the Elder and sister of Germanicus and CLAUDIUS, aunt of Drusus Caesar (see JULIO-CLAUDIANS and to the right)	Lucius Aelius Sejanus, the almost emperor	Aemilia Lepida	Drusus Caesar, son of Agrippina the Elder, daughter of Julia the Elder (see AUGUSTUS and Julia the Younger above and see JULIO-CLAUDIANS)
Gaius Cassius Longinus (descended from or related to GAIUS CASSIUS LONGINUS, see above)	Junia Lepida	Junia Calvina	Lucius Vitellius (consul 48)	Aulus VITELLIUS (for Otho's relation, in terms of the Year of the Four Emperors, he married Poppaea Sabina, who married NERO, see AUGUSTUS and CLAUDIUS above)
Cassia Longina	Gnaeus Domitius Corbulo, brother of Milona, wife of CALIGULA, see JULIO-CLAUDIANS and see above
Lucius Aelius Lamia Plautius Aelianus	Domitia Longina	Domitian, see FLAVIANS and VESPASIAN
Plautia (possibly existed, although unsure, but if so, then her brother is Lucius Fundanius Lamia Aelianus, father of Lucius Plautius Lamia Silvanus, alleged ancestor of Fabia Orestilla, wife of Gordian I, see GORDIANS)	Lucius Ceionius Commodus
Lucius Aelius Caesar	Marcus Aurelius (see NERVA-ANTONINES)
Lucius Verus (for further relations, see NERVA-ANTONINES)	Lucilla

(1): 1st spouse
(2): 2nd spouse
†: assassin of Caesar

== Cultural depictions ==
=== Literature ===
Servilia is the subject of a poem by John Dryden. A fictionalized Servilia appears in the Emperor series of novels by Conn Iggulden, who has portrayed her as a courtesan. Servilia is a character in Colleen McCullough's Masters of Rome series.

=== Television and film ===
A fictionalised version of Servilia was among the principal characters in the 2005 HBO television series Rome, played by Lindsay Duncan. The Servilia of HBO's Rome was depicted as instigating actor in the plot against Caesar's life; there is no historical evidence thereof. A similarly fictionalised Servilia makes an appearance in the 2005 six-part mini series Empire, played by Trudie Styler. Natalie Medlock portrays Servilia in the 2018 Netflix television docudrama series Roman Empire.

== See also ==
- Servilia gens
- List of Roman women
