= Marcus Junius Silanus (consul 25 BC) =

Roman consul 25 BC

- Born: Rome
- Died: Rome
- Known for: Roman consul
- Spouse: Manlia Torquata
- Children: Marcus Junius Silanus; Gaius Junius Silanus
- Parents: Decimus Junius Silanus (father); Servilia (mother)

Marcus Junius D. f. M. n. Silanus was a Roman senator and consul in 25 BC as the colleague of Gaius Julius Caesar Octavianus, the emperor Augustus.

== Biography ==
Silanus was a descendant of the noble Roman house of the Junii Silani. He was probably the son of Decimus Junius Silanus, consul in 62 BC, (thus the grandson of Marcus Junius Silanus, consul in 109 BC.) and Servilia, mistress of Julius Caesar, (thus the half brother of Brutus the Younger, full brother of Junia Prima, Junia Secunda and Junia Tertia and the brother-in-law of Marcus Aemilius Lepidus, the triumvir, through Secunda.

Silanus was possibly the same man who served as one of Julius Caesar's legates in 53 BC. (Note: In his monumental Magistrates of the Roman Republic, T.R.S. Broughton suggests that the consul of 25 BC might be distinguished from the legate of 53 BC.)

He supported his brother-in-law Lepidus in 44 BC after Caesar's murder, accompanying Lepidus over the Alps. The following year, Lepidus sent him with a detachment of troops to join Marcus Antonius at Mutina, but refused to accept responsibility for the help which Silanus gave. After falling out of favor with the triumvirs, in 39 he fled to Sextus Pompeius. He was able to return to Antonius's service under the terms of the Pact of Misenum.

A Silanus later served under Antonius in Achaea and Macedonia from 34 to 32, with the title of Quaestor pro consule or perhaps Proquaestor. Although the inscription in Achaea names a Silanus whose parents were named Marcus and Sempronia. Around this time he was also elected as an Augur.

Before the Battle of Actium, Silanus went over to Octavianus. The future emperor raised him to the Patriciate in 30 BC, and they held the consulship together in 25.

Marcus may have married a woman named Manlia from the Manlii Torquati, based on his descendants names. Silanus' grandson, Marcus Junius Silanus Torquatus, was consul in AD 19, and married a great-granddaughter of Augustus.

== See also ==
- Junia gens

== Sources ==
- T. Robert S. Broughton, The Magistrates of the Roman Republic, Vol II (1952).
- Syme, Ronald, The Roman Revolution, Clarendon Press, Oxford, 1939.
- Anthon, Charles & Smith, William, A New Classical Dictionary of Greek and Roman Biography, Mythology and Geography (1860).

Political offices
Preceded by Augustus VIII; Titus Statilius Taurus II	Roman consul 25 BC with Augustus IX	Succeeded by Augustus X Gaius Norbanus Flaccus
