= Servilia (wife of Lepidus) =

1st century BC Roman woman

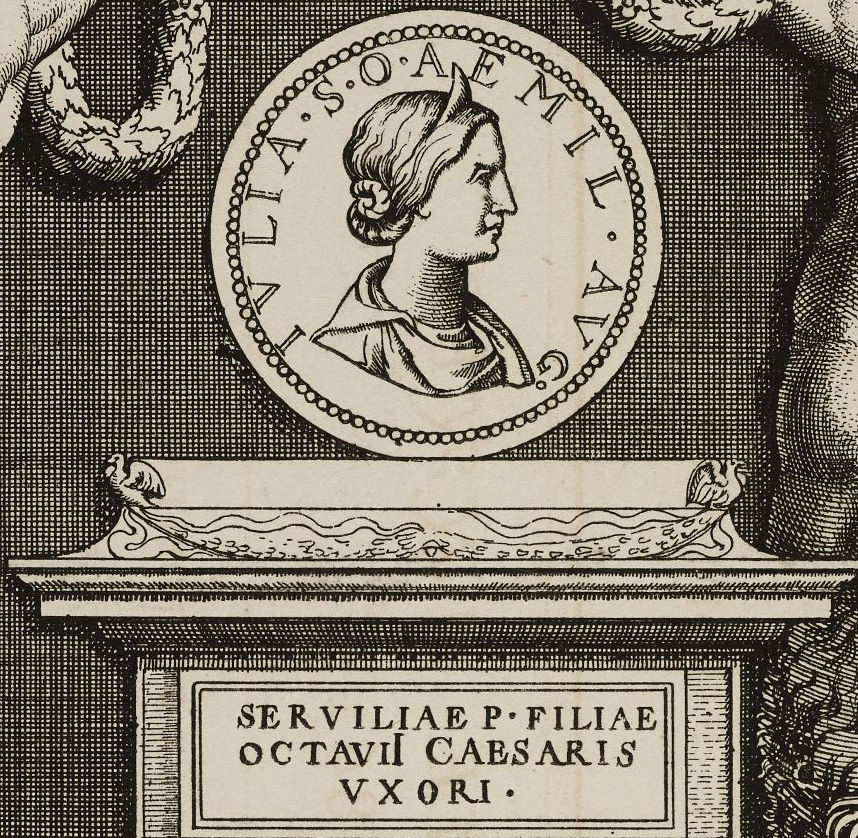
- Born: Rome
- Died: Rome
- Known for: Wife of Marcus Aemilius Lepidus Minor, possibly fiancée of Octavian
- Spouse: Marcus Aemilius Lepidus Minor
- Parents: Publius Servilius Vatia Isauricus (father); Junia Prima (mother)

Servilia (sometimes called Servilia Isaurica or Servilia Vatia) was an ancient Roman woman who was the wife of Marcus Aemilius Lepidus Minor, the son of the triumvir and Pontifex maximus Lepidus. She may also have been the same Servilia who was at one time engaged to Octavian (the future Emperor Augustus).

== Biography ==
Servilia was the daughter of Caesarian consul Publius Servilius Vatia Isauricus and Junia Prima, the eldest daughter of Servilia Caepionis, a mistress of Julius Caesar and prominent woman of the late republic. This made her the niece of Junia Secunda, Junia Tertia, Marcus Junius Silanus and Marcus Junius Brutus, Caesar's assassin.

Isaurica was likely the same Servilia who was engaged to Octavian as a young girl, (although it is possible that that girl was actually a sister of hers, as all women who shared fathers had the same name in Republican Rome). This was likely a politically motivated betrothal, since her father was one of Octavian's supporters and her mother, Junia Prima, was a sister-in-law of the triumvir Lepidus (married to Junia Secunda), thus the marriage would have strengthened Octavian's bonds with the two. Nonetheless, he eventually rejected Servilia and married Claudia instead. Servilia's later union with Lepidus was possibly proposed by her mother and the triumvirs in an attempt to soothe any ill feelings created by Octavian's rejection.

In 31 BC, her husband led a plot to assassinate Octavian, motivated by the banishment of his father (and possibly the scorning of his wife). He had tried to restore his exiled father to a position of authority but was caught and condemned to death. When her husband was killed, she committed suicide, the method of which is stated in ancient sources to have been swallowing hot coals or alternatively drinking to death, possibly due to coal-eating being regarded as too Gothic. Suicide by a widow was considered a great sign of devotion in Rome at the time. It has been proposed that her manner of death might have been misattributed to her cousin-once-removed Porcia historically.

== Legacy ==
In the past historians sometimes believed that the Servilia and Augustus had actually married, but it is widely agreed upon today that they were only ever engaged. It has been proposed that the character of Lavinia in The Aeneid was in part intended to represent Servilia.

Servilia appears Colleen McCullough's Masters of Rome series, first in The October Horse where Octavian promises her father to marry to get him on his side, when this is decided she is still too young to marry so Octavian plans to wait out the engagement until he can find someone he is actually in love with. In In the 2007 novel Antony and Cleopatra by Australian author Colleen McCullough, Servilia is mentioned several times. She is described as a virgin who Octavian has little interest in and knows she will marry Lepidus instead.

== See also ==
- Women in ancient Rome
