= Publius Servilius Isauricus =

1st century BC Roman senator and consul

Publius Servilius Isauricus was a Roman senator who served as consul in 48 BC together with Julius Caesar. He is generally regarded as a puppet of Caesar, having a long friendship with the Dictator.

== Biography ==
=== Early life ===
He was the son of Publius Servilius Vatia Isauricus.

=== Career ===
In 54 BC, Isauricus was praetor. As praetor he opposed Gaius Pomptinus in his endeavour to obtain a triumph. At the start of the civil war, Isauricus defected from the optimates to Caesar. Caesar made him his colleague as consul for 48 BC. Caesar soon left Rome to fight Pompey in Greece and left Isauricus in command of the city.

In March 48, praetor Marcus Caelius Rufus began talking of abolishing all debt in the city, as even the upper classes had begun to feel the pressure of shortage of money; even Cicero's wife Terentia was forced to sell most of her jewelry. Caelius, however, had no jurisdiction on the standing of debts, his only magistracy being in the administration of foreigners in Rome; instead, debts fell under Gaius Trebonius' jurisdiction.

After Caelius set up a tribunal within earshot of Trebonius in the Forum for the second time, Isauricus himself went to the Forum to confront the rogue magistrate, followed by a retinue of fasces-wielding guards. After a heated argument on the tribunal, Isauricus famously pulled an axe out of one of the fasces and destroyed Caelius's wooden magistrate's chair. Caelius and Isauricus nearly came to blows, and the mob became so confrontational with the Consul that the guards actually needed to unsheathe their axes to ward them off.

Caelius made fun of Isauricus by holding up his repaired magistrate's chair, which was held together with leather straps. Famously, Isauricus was beaten by his father with a strap of leather, which was shameful for the family name, though Isauricus himself claimed it had toughened him up. Caelius repeatedly escaped Isauricus, and was not arrested but went to join Titus Annius Milo in an insurrection against Caesar, and were both captured and executed.

=== Later life and family ===
Isauricus married Junia Prima. After Caesar's murder, Isauricus took the side of the Senate against Mark Antony. When Octavian, to whom Isauricus's daughter Servilia was engaged to be married, deserted the cause of the Senate and made peace with Antony, Isauricus deserted the cause of the Senate as well. On the formation of the Triumvirate, Octavian broke his engagement with Servilia in order to marry Claudia, the daughter of Fulvia, the wife of Antony. As compensation for this injury, Isauricus was made consul in 41 BC with Lucius Antonius as his colleague. Servilia seems to have married Lepidus the Younger, the son of the triumvir. It is also possible that Isauricus had a son who married a Lepida who was a relative of Claudia Marcella Minor.

== In popular culture ==
In John Milius, William J. MacDonald and Bruno Heller's HBO series Rome, Publius Servilius Isauricus is portrayed by Simon Callow.

Political offices
Preceded by Gaius Claudius Marcellus; Lucius Cornelius Lentulus Crus	Roman consul 48 BC; With: Julius Caesar	Succeeded by Quintus Fufius Calenus; Publius Vatinius
Preceded by Marcus Aemilius Lepidus; Lucius Munatius Plancus	Roman consul II; 41 BC; With: Lucius Antonius	Succeeded by Gnaeus Domitius Calvinus; Gaius Asinius Pollio
