= Drusus Caesar =

Heir to Roman emperor Tiberius (died AD 33)

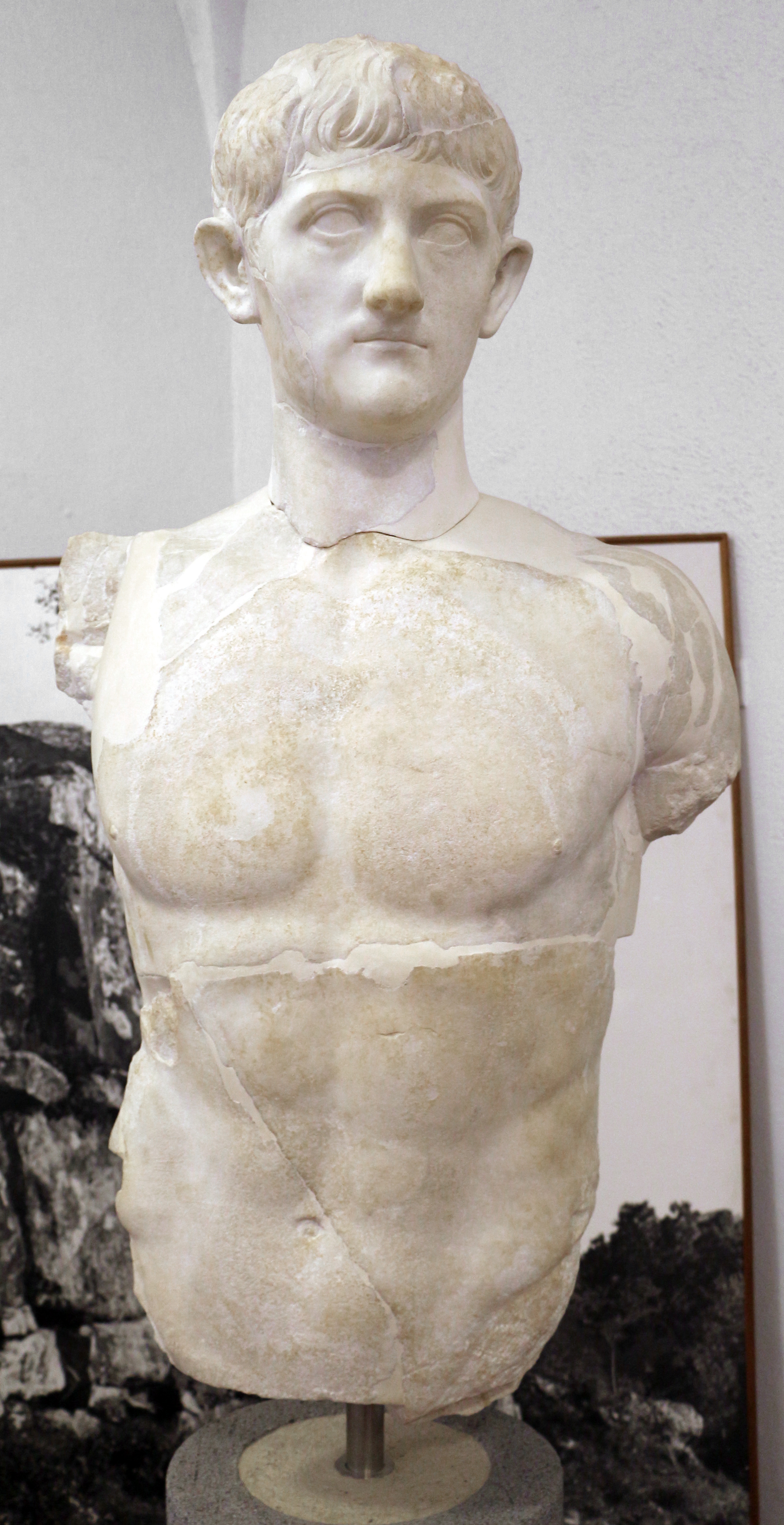
- Possible statue of Drusus Caesar, from Roselle (Grosseto)
- Born: c. AD 8
- Died: AD 33 (aged approx. 25)
- Burial: Mausoleum of Augustus
- Spouse: Aemilia Lepida
Names
- Drusus Julius Caesar (Germanicus)
- Dynasty: Julio-Claudian
- Father: Germanicus
- Mother: Agrippina the Elder

Drusus Caesar (Note: An arch at Ticinum erected immediately after his birth calls him 'Drusus Julius Germanicus', but everywhere else, in coins and other inscriptions, his name invariably appears simply as 'Drusus Caesar'. Modern sources sometimes give his full name as 'Drusus Julius Caesar Germanicus'. He has also been called "Drusus III", after Drusus the Younger and Drusus the Elder.) (c. AD 8 – 33) was the grandson by adoption and heir of the Roman emperor Tiberius, alongside his brother Nero. Born into the prominent Julio-Claudian dynasty, Drusus was the son of Tiberius' general and heir, Germanicus.

Sejanus, the prefect of the Praetorian Guard, had become powerful in Rome and is believed by ancient writers such as Suetonius and Tacitus to have been responsible for the downfall of Tiberius' son, Drusus the Younger. As Sejanus' power grew, other members of the imperial family began to fall as well. In AD 29, Tiberius wrote a letter to the Senate attacking Drusus' mother Agrippina and brother Nero, and the Senate had them both exiled. Two years later, Nero died in exile on the island of Ponza. Drusus was later imprisoned following similar charges as his brother, and remained in prison from AD 30 until his death three years later. Their deaths allowed for the ascension of their third brother, Gaius Caligula, following the death of Tiberius in AD 37.

== Background and family ==
Drusus was born in AD 8 to Germanicus and Agrippina the Elder. (Note: He assumed the toga virilis in AD 23, meaning he was at least 14 years old at the time.) Drusus' paternal grandparents were Nero Claudius Drusus (Drusus the Elder) and Antonia Minor, daughter of Mark Antony and Octavia Minor. His maternal grandparents were Marcus Vipsanius Agrippa, a close friend of Augustus, and Augustus' daughter Julia the Elder. Drusus had eight siblings: four brothers (Tiberius and Gaius, who died young; Nero Julius Caesar; and another Gaius, nicknamed "Caligula"), three sisters (Agrippina the Younger, Julia Drusilla, and Julia Livilla), and a brother — born around 17AD — of unknown name (normally referenced as Ignotus).

As a member of the Julio-Claudian dynasty, he was a close relative of all five Julio-Claudian emperors: his great-grandfather Augustus was the first emperor of the dynasty, his great-uncle Tiberius was the second emperor, his brother Gaius (Caligula) was the third emperor, his uncle Claudius was the fourth emperor, and his nephew Lucius Domitius (more commonly known as "Nero") was the fifth and final emperor of the dynasty.

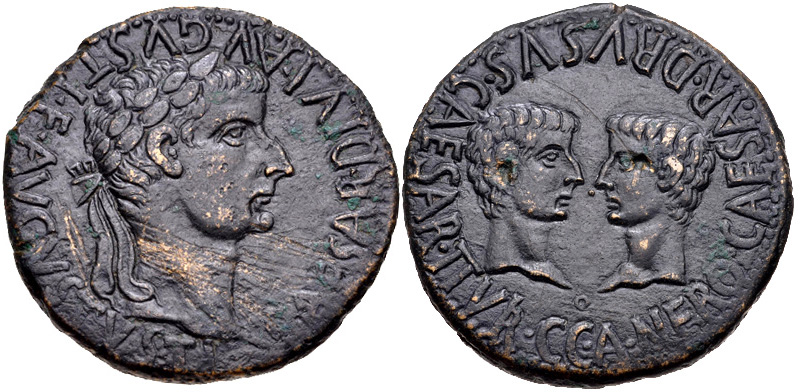
As depicting Tiberius on the obverse and heads of Nero and Drusus on reverse

His father was the adopted son of Tiberius, who was himself the adoptive son of Augustus, whose adoptions were the result of the death of Gaius Caesar in February AD 4. Gaius, who was the heir of Augustus, had died of illness in Syria. Germanicus was for some time considered a potential heir by Augustus, but Augustus later decided in favor of his stepson Tiberius. As a result, in June AD 4, Augustus adopted Tiberius on the condition that Tiberius first adopt Germanicus. As a corollary to the adoption, Germanicus was wed to his second cousin Agrippina the Elder the following year.

In AD 13, his father was appointed commander of the forces on the Rhine, from where he led three campaigns into Germany against the forces of Arminius, which had made him popular as he avenged the humiliating Roman defeat at the Battle of Teutoburg Forest. In October AD 14, Germanicus received a delegation from the Senate giving its condolences for the death of Augustus. Augustus had died in August and Tiberius became emperor, making Germanicus heir to the empire.

At the direction of Tiberius, Germanicus was dispatched to Asia to reorganize the provinces and assert imperial authority there. The provinces were in such disarray that the attention of a member of the leading family was deemed necessary. However, after two years in the east, Germanicus came at odds with the governor of Syria, Gnaeus Calpurnius Piso. During their feud, Germanicus fell ill and died in October AD 19.

Drusus married Aemilia Lepida around AD 29. She was the daughter of Marcus Aemilius Lepidus, his second cousin. Tacitus reports that during their marriage "she had pursued her husband with ceaseless accusations". In 36, she was charged with adultery with a slave and committed suicide, "since there was no question about her guilt".

His mother Agrippina believed her husband was murdered to promote Drusus the Younger as heir, and feared that the birth of his twin sons would give him motive to displace her own sons. However, her fears were unfounded, with Nero being elevated by Tiberius in AD 20. Nero received the toga virilis (toga of manhood), was promised the office of quaestor five years in advance, and was wed to Drusus the Younger's daughter Julia.

Following the death of Germanicus, Drusus the Younger was Tiberius' new heir. He received a second consulship in AD 21 and tribunicia potestas (tribunician power) in AD 22. At the same time, Praetorian prefect Sejanus now came to exert considerable influence over the emperor, who referred to Sejanus as socius laborum ("my partner in my toils"). According to Tacitus and Cassius Dio, the Younger Drusus and Sejanus began bickering and entered a feud during which Drusus became ill and died of seemingly natural causes on 14 September 23. Ancient sources say the cause of death was poison, whereas modern authors, such as Barbara Levick, suggest that it may have been due to illness.

== Career ==
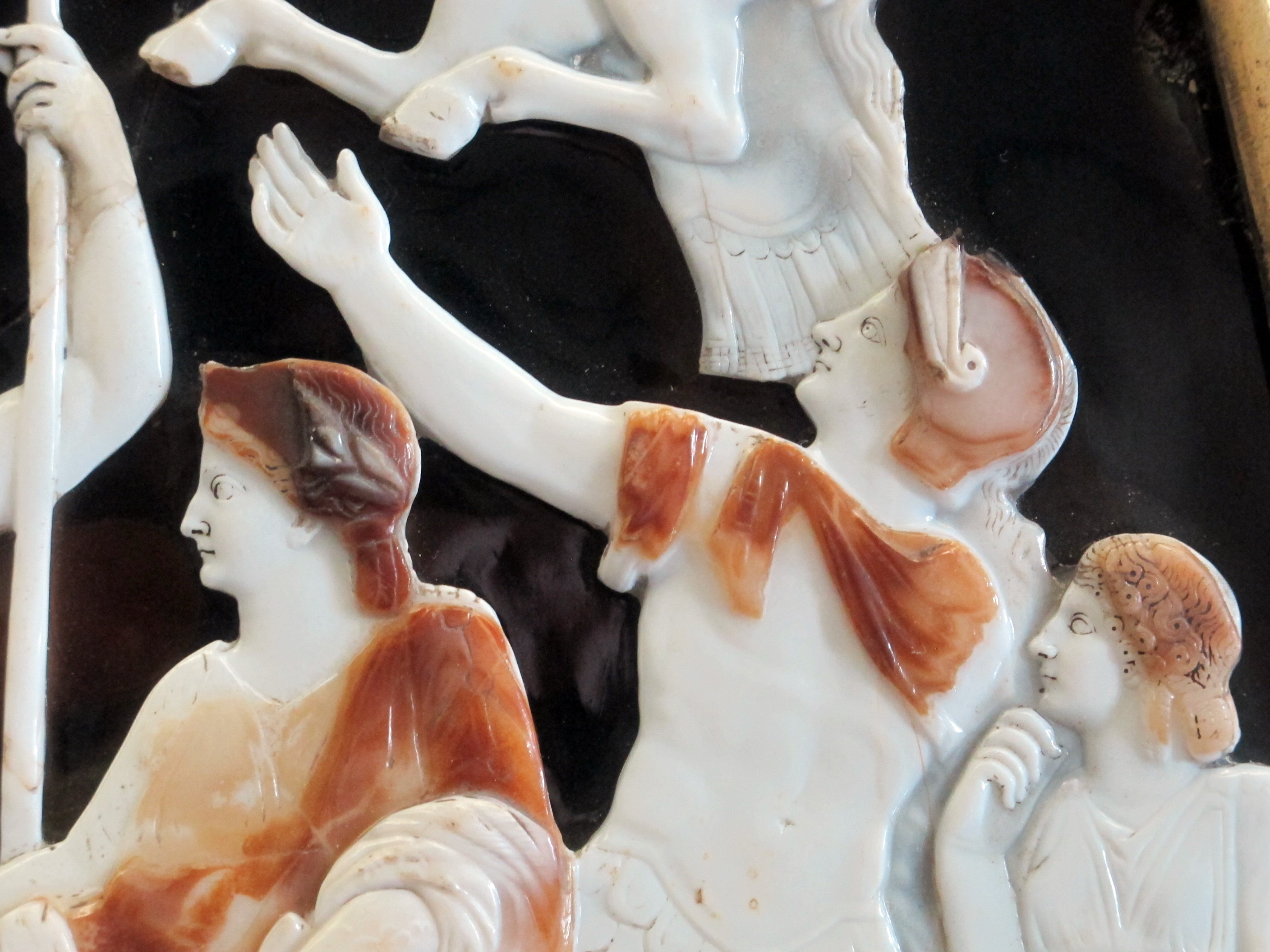
Detail from the Great Cameo of France depicting Livia (left), Drusus (center), and Agrippina (right).

The death of the Younger Drusus left no immediate threat to Sejanus. Ultimately, his death elevated Drusus and Nero to the position of heirs. Drusus received the toga virilis and was promised the rank of quaestor five years before the legal age, just as his brother Nero had been given. In effect, this formed factions around them and their mother Agrippina on the one side and Sejanus on the other. It is impossible to know the full extent of Sejanus' power at this point, but it has been noted that Sejanus was not allowed to marry Livilla (Drusus the Younger's widow) and was thus denied entry into the imperial family. In the Senate, Sejanus encountered little opposition from the senators, but Tiberius expressed displeasure in the Senate, in AD 24, at the public prayers which had been offered for Nero and his brother Drusus' health.

In 28, the Senate voted that altars to Clementia (mercy) and Amicitia (friendship) be raised. At that time, Clementia was considered a virtue of the ruling class, for only the powerful could give clemency. The altar of Amicitia was flanked by statues of Sejanus and Tiberius. By this time his association with Tiberius was such that there were even those in Roman society who erected statues in his honor and gave prayers and sacrifices in his honor. Like members of the imperial family, Sejanus' birthday was to be honored. According to author and historian Alston, "Sejanus' association with Tiberius must have at least indicated to the people that he would be further elevated."

=== Downfall ===
The very next year saw a direct attack on Agrippina and Nero: Tiberius sent a letter to the Senate in which he accused Agrippina and Nero of misconduct, but was unable to convict them of any attempt at rebellion; the attitude of the former and the sexual activity of the latter were the primary accusations against them. Agrippina was popular with the people, as was the family of Germanicus, and the people surrounded the senate-house carrying likenesses of the two in protest of the letter. The Senate refused to come to a resolution on the matter until it received plain direction from the emperor to do so. Tiberius found it necessary to repeat his charges, and when he did, the Senate no longer delayed; and the fate of Agrippina and Nero was sealed. Nero was declared an enemy of the state, removed to the island of Ponza, and was killed or encouraged to kill himself in 31.

After his wife Aemilia betrayed him for Sejanus, Drusus was dismissed by Tiberius. It wasn't long before he was accused by Cassius Severus of plotting against Tiberius. He was imprisoned and confined to a dungeon on the Palatine in 30. He starved to death in prison in 33 after having been reduced to chewing the stuffing of his bed.

== Postmortem ==
Sejanus remained powerful until his sudden downfall and summary execution in October AD 31, just after the death of Nero, the exact reasons for this remain unclear. After realizing his error in trusting Sejanus, Tiberius considered releasing Drusus, but decided that he had been imprisoned for too long to be released. The Senate was shocked reading the account of his imprisonment from his diary.

The deaths of Germanicus' oldest sons elevated his third son, Gaius Caesar (Caligula), to successor and he became princeps when Tiberius died in AD 37. Drusus the Younger's son Tiberius Gemellus was summoned to Capri by his grandfather Tiberius, where he and Gaius Caligula were made joint-heirs. When Caligula assumed power, he made Gemellus his adopted son, but Caligula soon had Gemellus killed for plotting against him.

== Ancestry ==
Ancestry of Drusus Caesar

8. Tiberius Claudius Nero
4. Nero Claudius Drusus
9. Livia Drusilla
2. Germanicus
10. Mark Antony
5. Antonia Minor
11. Octavia Minor
1. Drusus Julius Caesar
12. Lucius Vipsanius
6. Marcus Vipsanius Agrippa
3. Agrippina the Elder
14. Augustus
7. Julia the Elder
15. Scribonia

== Sources ==
- Adams, Geoff W. (2007), The Roman Emperor Gaius "Caligula" and His Hellenistic Aspirations, BrownWalker Press, ISBN 9781599424231
- Alston, Richard (1998), Aspects of Roman History AD 14–117, Routledge, ISBN 0-415-13236-3
- Bartsch, Shadi (2017), The Cambridge Companion to the Age of Nero, Cambridge University Press, ISBN 9781107052208
- Bingham, Sandra J. (1999), The praetorian guard in the political and social life of Julio-Claudian Rome, Ottawa: National Library of Canada, ISBN 0612271064
- Bunson, Mathew (2014), Encyclopedia of the Roman Empire, Infobase Publishing, ISBN 9781438110271
- Levick, Barbara (1999), Tiberius the Politician, Routledge, ISBN 0-415-21753-9
- Lott, J. Bert (2012), Death and Dynasty in Early Imperial Rome: Key Sources, with Text, Translation, and Commentary, Cambridge University Press, ISBN 978-0-521-86044-4
- Rowe, Greg (2002). Princes and Political Cultures: The New Tiberian Senatorial Decrees. Ann Arbor, US: University of Michigan Press. ISBN 0-472-11230-9.
- Salisbury, Joyce E. (2001), Women in the ancient world, ABC-CLIO, ISBN 978-1-57607-092-5
- Seager, Robin (2005), Tiberius, Blackwell Publishing, ISBN 1-4051-1529-7
- Stuart, Meriwether (1936). "The Date of the Inscription of Claudius on the Arch of Ticinum". American Journal of Archaeology. 40 (3): 314–322. doi:10.2307/498692. JSTOR 498692. S2CID 191396418.
- Swan, Michael Peter (2004), The Augustan Succession: An Historical Commentary on Cassius Dio's Roman History, Oxford University Press, ISBN 0-19-516774-0
- This article incorporates text from a publication now in the public domain: Smith, William, ed. (1873). "Drusus". Dictionary of Greek and Roman Biography and Mythology. Vol. 1. pp. 1087–1088.
- This article incorporates text from a publication now in the public domain: Smith, William, ed. (1880). "Nero". Dictionary of Greek and Roman Biography and Mythology. Vol. 2. pp. 1166–1167.
