= Scribonia (wife of Octavian) =

Roman noblewoman, second wife of Augustus and mother of Julia the Elder

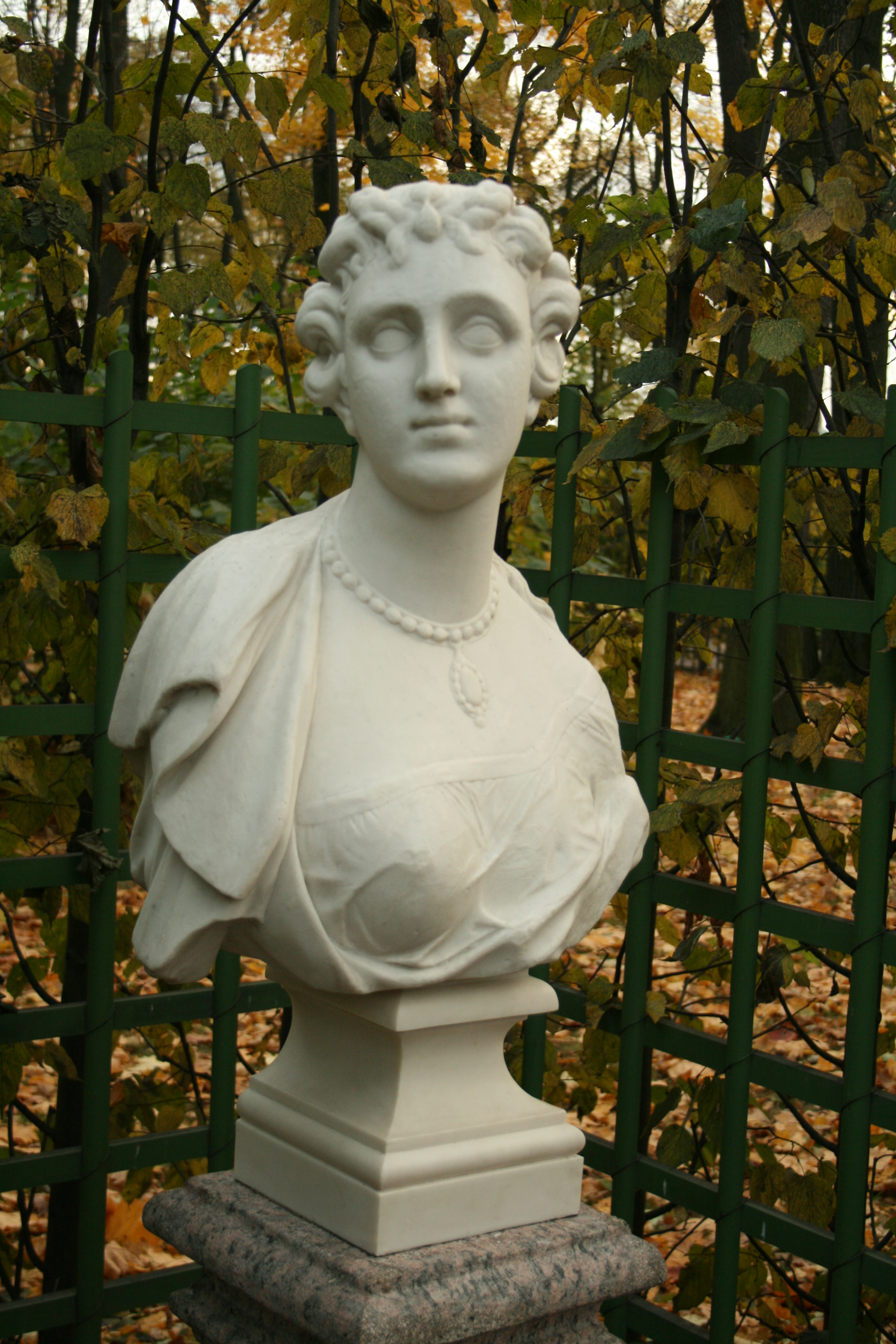
- Bust of Scribonia from the Summer Garden
- Born: c. 70 BC
- Died: c. AD 16 (aged 85)
- Spouses: Gnaeus Cornelius Lentulus Marcellinus; Octavian
- Issue: Cornelius Marcellinus; Cornelia; Julia the Elder

Scribonia (c. 70 BC – c. AD 16) was the second wife of Octavian, later the Roman Emperor Augustus, and the mother of his only biological child, Julia the Elder. Through this daughter, she was the mother-in-law of the Emperor Tiberius, great-grandmother of the Emperor Caligula and Empress Agrippina the Younger, and great-great-grandmother of the Emperor Nero.

== Biography ==
=== Parentage ===
Scribonia's parentage is unclear. It is known for certain that the name of her mother was Sentia, whose ancestors had been directors of the mint. Her father is another matter; it is known that her father was a "Lucius Scribonius Libo". The most commonly cited possibility was the praetor of that name in 80 BC. If this is so then she was the younger sister of a brother of the same name who was consul in 34 BC, whose daughter, another Scribonia, married Sextus Pompey. Another less common hypothesis was that she was a second daughter of the consul of 34 BC, rather than his sister.

=== First two marriages ===
According to Suetonius, Scribonia was married three times; her first two husbands were consuls. The name of the first is unknown, but a number of authorities—including Bartolomeo Borghesi, Hermann Dessau, Edmund Groag and Ronald Syme—have suggested that he was Gnaeus Cornelius Lentulus Marcellinus, consul in 56 BC, because of the existence of an inscription that refers to freedmen of Scribonia and her son Cornelius Marcellinus after 39 BC. This indicates she had a son from her first marriage who was living with her after she was divorced from Octavian. Suetonius makes no mention of him, only acknowledging her children from her second and third marriages, leading these authorities to conclude the young Marcellinus had died young.

Since she was married a second time, this led to the need to identify her second husband, by whom she had Cornelia, the wife of Lucius Aemilius Lepidus Paullus (suffect consul 34 BC), and who would die the year her brother ascended to the consulate. Since it had been assumed Cornelius Marcellinus had died young, another brother had to be found, and various candidates had been proposed, most recently Publius Cornelius Scipio, consul in 16 BC. This would provide the year that the young Cornelia died. However, no consular father could be identified for this Cornelia Scipio, which led Syme to remark that the problem of identifying the husbands of Scribonia "appears insoluble".

However, as historian John Scheid has pointed out, all of them overlook the fact that Suetonius clearly states there were no children by her first marriage. This would mean Cornelius Lentulus Marcellinus was her second husband, not her first. Cornelia's brother was not the consul of 16 BC, but the consul of 18 BC, and that was the year Cornelia died.

=== Octavian ===
In 40 BC, Scribonia was forced to divorce her second husband and marry Octavian, who had recently divorced his wife Claudia.

Octavian's motive in marrying Scribonia was to cement a political alliance with Sextus Pompey, husband to Scribonia's niece or sister. The marriage was brief and unhappy; he divorced her on the very same day as the birth of their daughter, Julia the Elder, his only natural child. He allegedly wrote that he was "unable to put up with her shrewish disposition." He remarried to Livia Drusilla soon after. Scribonia herself never remarried and appears to have continued to be known as the wife of Caesar thereafter.

In 6 BC or 5 BC, Augustus arranged a marriage between their granddaughter, Julia the Younger, to Lucius Aemilius Paullus, Cornelia's son and Scribonia's grandson, demonstrating his desire to maintain connections with his second wife's family.

Despite her reputation from some modern historians as being "tiresome" and "morose" based on Octavian's reasons for divorce, she appears to have been a figure of some repute and standing. In 18 BC, the same year that her son rose to the consulship, her daughter Cornelia died and became the subject of an elegy by Propertius, in which Scribonia is mentioned.

Nor have I wronged you, Scribonia, mother, my sweet origin: what do you wish changed in me, except my fate? My mother's tears and the city's grief exalt me, and my bones are protected by Caesar's moans. He laments that living I was worthy sister to his daughter, and we have seen a god's tears fall.

Suetonius also notes Scribonia's affiliation with Scribonius Aphrodisius, slave and pupil of Lucius Orbilius Pupillus. He was afterwards purchased by Scribonia, possibly to educate her children or even herself, and he was subsequently manumitted by her. Based on this, it is possible that she encouraged him and others as a patroness. Aphrodisius is known to have written a now lost treatise on orthography, in opposition to Verrius Flaccus.

=== Voluntary exile ===
In 2 BC, Julia was exiled to Pandateria for adultery and possible treason. Scribonia voluntarily accompanied her into exile. Around AD 4, Julia and Scribonia were allowed to return to the mainland and moved to Rhegium, where Augustus granted Julia property and a yearly income. Scribonia probably remained with her for the fifteen years Julia lived in exile. Julia died in AD 14, shortly after her father's death. Contemporary historians are vague regarding the circumstances of her death; while Dio Cassius indicates Tiberius had her killed, Tacitus writes that after her youngest son, Agrippa Postumus, was murdered she succumbed to despair and her health slowly declined.

Scribonia survived her daughter and appears to have returned to the family mansion in Rome.

=== Last years ===
She was about 85 when she died. Scribonia's last known activity was around AD 16; when her great-nephew, Marcus Scribonius Libo Drusus, conspired against Tiberius she encouraged him to face trial and punishment rather than commit suicide, telling him, "What joy is there in doing another man's job?" Drusus did not listen and took his life shortly after. Although Seneca disapproves of Scribonia's advice, referring to her as "gravis femina; gravis", meaning "dignified and severe" in an old fashioned Roman manner, modern historians have praised her as an exemplary Roman matron with the composure to sustain her rejected daughter Julia and suicidal nephew Scribonius in their tragic misfortunes.

== Marriages and issue ==
- An unknown consular; no children
- Gnaeus Cornelius Lentulus Marcellinus, consul 56 BC, died c. 49 BC.
  - Publius Cornelius Lentulus Marcellinus, consul 18 BC.
  - Cornelia (between 48 BC and 41 BC – 18 BC)
- Gaius Julius Caesar Octavianus (Augustus)
  - Julia the Elder (39 BC – AD 14)

Her great-great-grandson, Marcus Junius Silanus Torquatus, was born during her lifetime.

== Cultural depictions ==
- In the novel, I, Claudius, Robert Graves incorrectly places Scribonia's death shortly before Augustus and Julia's, rather than after.
- In Allan Massie's novel Augustus she is portrayed stereotypically; ugly, gap-toothed and fat. The novel implies Julia's behaviour is the result of her mother Scribonia rather than a perceived hypocrisy of her father Augustus.
- Scribonia is a main character in the novel Caesar's Daughter by Edward Burton. She is a patroness of the arts, and enjoys popularity with the Roman people and Augustus' respect. Contrary to contemporary and modern historians accounts, she plays an active role in Julia's life.
- In Elisabeth Dored's novel I Loved Tiberius, Augustus' reign is portrayed as a dictatorship. Scribonia is portrayed as a motherly and steadfast woman forbidden any contact with Julia until her exile.
- She appears in the final novel in the Masters of Rome series, Antony and Cleopatra, by Colleen McCullough. Octavius initially finds her very attractive and agreeable, but difficulties with the alliance and their marriage overall leads to its breakdown. Contrary to contemporary historians, Scribonia is allowed to partake in Julia's education.
- Scribonia appears briefly in Cleopatra's Daughter (2009), by Michelle Moran. She is at a theater, watching her daughter, Julia, from afar because after the divorce they were not allowed to see each other; she is shunned by affluent society who are afraid of angering Augustus and Livia.
- In Betray the Night: A Novel about Ovid by Benita Kane Jaro, Scribonia is portrayed as an elderly woman of great strength and personal distinction and courage, who all her life, in spite of the handicaps imposed on women, has been an important player in the factional and family politics of the Augustan period.
- In the TV series Domina (2021), Scribonia was played by Bailey Spalding and Christine Bottomley.
