= Junia =

Junia may refer to:

- Three daughters of Servilia, mistress of Caesar, sisters or half sisters of Marcus Junius Brutus
  Junia Prima
  Junia Secunda
  Junia Tertia
- Junia Calvina, Roman noblewoman of 1st century
- Junia Lepida, another Roman noblewoman of 1st century
- Junia Claudilla, first wife of Caligula
- Junia Silana, sister of Junia Claudilla
- Junia (New Testament person), or Junias, a person mentioned by Paul in the Epistle to the Romans
- Junia (gens), a Roman gens
- Lex Junia Licinia, a Roman law from 62 BC
- Juniyan (Junia), a village in Pakistan
- Júnia Ferreira Furtado, Portuguese historian
- Júnía Lín Hua Jónsdóttir, twin sister of Icelandic singer Laufey

== See also ==
- Jounieh, Lebanon
