= Arminio (Biber) =

Opera by Heinrich Ignaz Franz Biber

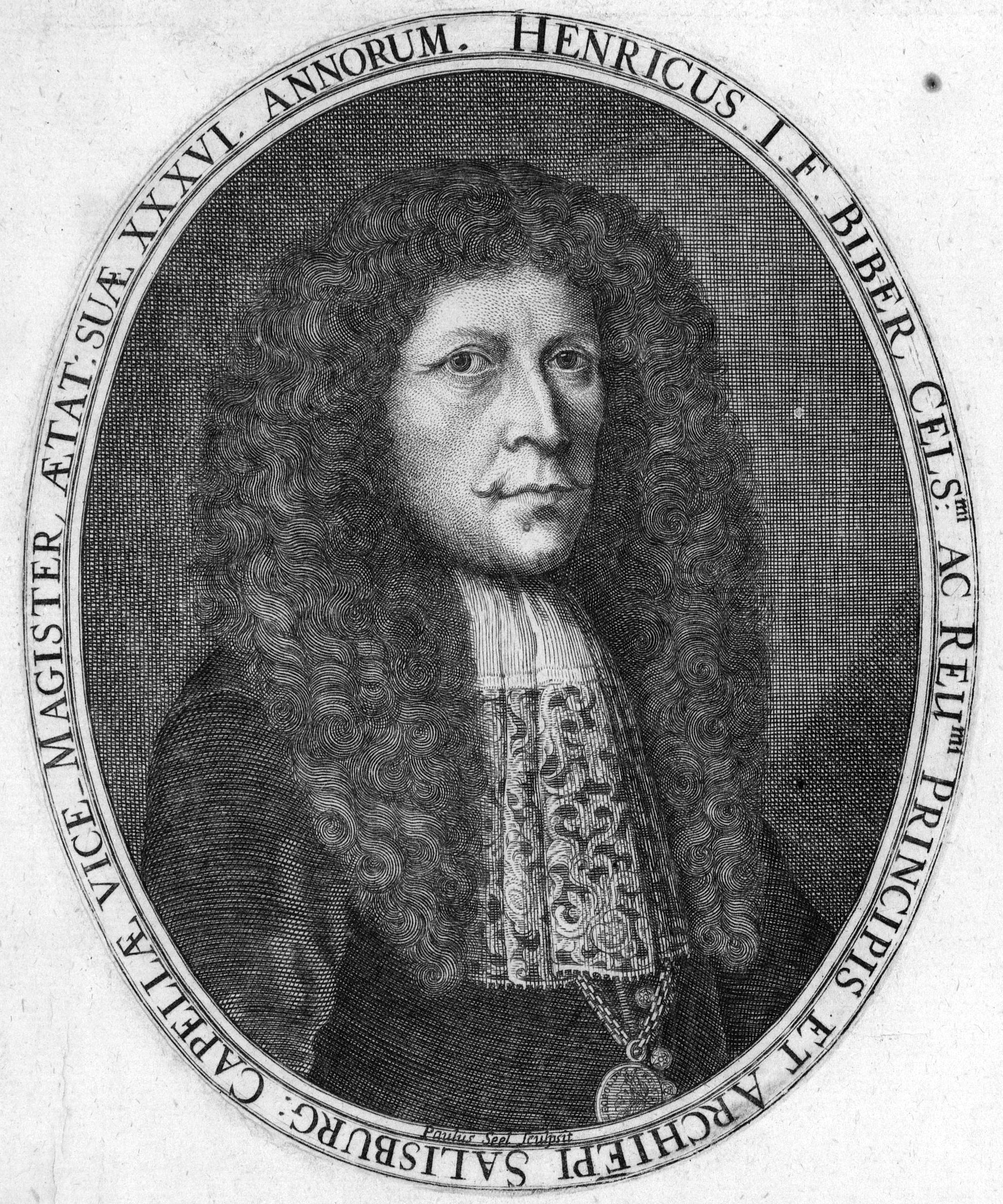
Portrait of Heinrich Ignaz Franz Biber

Arminio or Chi la Dura la Vince is an opera ("Dramma musicale") – and the earliest extant opera composed in Salzburg – in three acts about the Germanic military hero Arminius, and the only surviving opera composed by Heinrich Ignaz Franz Biber, composed ca. 1690–1692 with an Italian libretto probably by Francesco Maria Raffaelini. The manuscript score is kept in the Carolino Augusteum of Salzburg.

== Roles ==
Role	Voice type
Arminio A Germanic warrior	Bass
Calligola Son of Germanico, enamored of Segesta	Alto
Claudia Enamored of Caligola	Soprano
Climmia Giulia's nurse	Tenor or Soprano
Erchino Court jester, enamored of Climmia	Tenor
Germanico A Roman commander, adopted son of Tiberio	Tenor
Giulia Enamored of Caligola	Soprano
Nerone Son of Germanico, enamored of Giulia	Tenor
Segesta The wife of Arminio	Soprano
Seiano Prefect of the Praetorians	Alto or Bass
Tiberio Emperor of the Romans	Bass
Vitellio A friend of Germanico	Alto

== Synopsis ==
- Place and Time: Rome during the reign of emperor Tiberius.

The opera is about the story of the wife of Arminius, Thusnelda (Segesta) who becomes prisoner of Germanicus.

== Recordings ==
H.I.F. Biber: Arminio, Salzburger Hofmusik, Il Dolcimelo.

- Conductor: Wolfgang Brunner
- Singers:

Gotthold Schwarz / Bernhard Landauer / Irena Troupova / Regina Schwarzer / Otto Rastbichler / Hermann Oswald / Barbara Schlick / Gerd Türk / Xenia Meijer / Florian Mehltretter / Gerd Kenda / Markus Forster

- Recording date: April 1994
- Label: CPO

== See also ==
- Arminius (Bruch)
- Arminio
- Hermann und Thusnelda
