= Atimetus =

Ancient Roman freedman

Atimetus (d. 56 CE) was a freedman of ancient Rome who lived in the 1st century CE. He was a paramour of Domitia, the aunt of the Roman emperor Nero and a rival to Nero's mother, Agrippina the Younger.

Atimetus was drawn into court intrigues against Agrippina when Junia Silana influenced two men, Iturius and Calvisius, to denounce Agrippina to Atimetus, saying that Agrippina was plotting with Rubellius Plautus to overthrow Nero. Atimetus tried to convince another of Domitia's freedmen, Lucius Domitius Paris, to denounce Agrippina as well, as Paris was seen to enjoy some favor in Nero's court.

When the accusation was made to the emperor, in 56 CE, Agrippina counter-accused Paris and Atimetus of inventing a melodramatic fiction, and successfully defended herself of the charges. As a result, Junia Silana was exiled, Iturius and Calvisius were banished, and Atimetus was put to death, presumably for the crime of calumnia. Paris and Rubellius Plautus received no punishments.
