= Junia Silana =

Roman noblewoman

- Died: 59 C.E. Tarentum
- Other name: Junia Silana Torquata
- Known for: sister of Junia Claudilla
- Spouse: Gaius Silius
- Parent: Marcus Junius Silanus
- Family: Junii Silani

Junia Silana (died 59 C.E.) was a Roman patrician. She was the sister of Junia Claudilla, the first wife of Caligula, before he became emperor. Silana was a prominent figure in the power struggles that transpired in the reign of three different emperors. She was also noted for her close relationship with Julia Agrippina.

== Biography ==
=== Early life and marriage ===
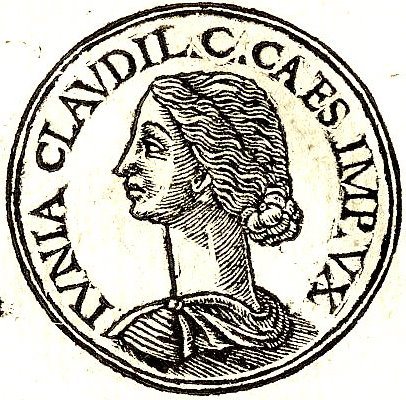
Junia Claudilla, Junia Silana's sister.

Silana was one of the daughters of the famous orator and consul suffectus, Marcus Junius Silanus, who became the father-in-law of Caligula after the latter married Silana's sister, Junia Claudilla, in 30 or 31 C.E. There are no sources detailing Silana's early life since the earliest records mentioned her name when she was already an adult and married to Gaius Silius. After Claudilla died of childbirth, Caligula forced Silana's father to commit suicide in 38 C.E. Historians such as François-Joseph de Champagny and Rodolfo Lanciani speculated that she may have been engaged to or married Caligula's older brother Nero before he married Julia Livia.

Silana first made an appearance in historical records during a court intrigue involving Messalina. Her husband Silius - considered one of the most handsome men in Rome - divorced her at the instigation of Messalina. According to Tacitus, Silius was compelled to do so for fear of certain death if he refused. A year later, Silius and Messalina, who was noted for her adulterous affairs, were married even though the latter was still legally married to Emperor Claudius. The pair was executed after the freedman Narcissus informed the emperor, who was at Ostia, of their lavish wedding and the plot to assassinate him.

=== Relationship with Agrippina ===
History next knew of Silana, when she became close to Agrippina. Her high station at the imperial court and Agrippina's animosity with Messalina cemented this friendship. She was cited as one of the few personages who maintained contact with Agrippina as her son Emperor Nero sought to diminish her influence. She was identified as one of the few friends who supported Agrippina during the latter's political isolation. The relationship, however, soured when Agrippina interfered after Silana, who was already old at this point, announced an impending marriage with the young Roman aristocrat, Sentius Africanus. It is said that Agrippina blocked the marriage to prevent the young noble from inheriting Silana's immense wealth.

Silana and Agrippina became bitter enemies. Their conflict culminated in an intrigue that involved a false plot to assassinate Nero. After the death of Britannicus, Agrippina began losing her influence in the imperial court. Silana chose this opportunity to sow intrigue. She employed two of her agents, Iturius and Calvisius, to relay an allegation to Atimetus that Agrippina was behind the plot to kill her son. When presented with the accusation, however, Agrippina successfully dispelled the charges. Silana was exiled at Tarentum in 55 C.E. An account cited that she was recalled to Rome in 59 C.E. after the murder of Agrippina. Silana died during the journey.

== See also ==
- Women in ancient Rome
- List of Roman women
