= Lucius Domitius Paris =

Ancient Roman actor and slave of Domitia Lepida Minor

Paris was a slave of Domitia Lepida Minor who became wealthy enough to buy his freedom from her, adding her nomen to his own name to make his citizen name Lucius Domitius Paris. In return, she influenced him via Atimetus (another of her freedmen) to use his favour with Nero himself to convince him of her fabrication that his influential and popular mother Agrippina was plotting to depose him.

However, Paris stood so high in the theatre-loving Nero's favour that, even when the plot failed, he alone among the conspirators was not punished and was even declared freeborn (ingenuus) by the emperor soon afterwards, forcing Domitia to hand back the sum she had accepted to free him. However, Nero later saw Paris as a rival actor to himself, and in AD 67, displeased that Paris had refused to teach him the art of miming, had him put to death.
