= Marcus Junius Silanus (consul 15) =

Roman senator and consul (c.26 BC-37 AD)

- Died: 37 AD
- Children: Junia Silana; Junia Claudilla
- Parents: Gaius Junius M. f. Silanus (father); Atia M. f. (mother)
- Relatives: Caligula (son-in-law)
- Family: Junii Silani

Marcus Junius C. f. M. n. Silanus (c. 26 BC – AD 37) was an Ancient Roman senator who became suffect consul in AD 15. His daughter Junia Claudilla was the first wife of Emperor Caligula.

== Biography ==
=== Early life ===
Marcus' father was Gaius Junius Silanus who was the son of Marcus Junius Silanus, the consul of 25 BC. Marcus had two brothers Decimus Junius Silanus and Gaius Junius Silanus, and a sister named Junia Torquata. Decimus was banished for having an affair with Vipsania Julia during the reign of Augustus. Their mother may have been an Atia, daughter of Marcus Atius Balbus and Claudia. Balbus was the uncle of emperor Augustus.

=== Political career ===
Ancient historians considered Marcus Silanus a highly respected man. When Tiberius came to power, if a judicial decision made by Silanus was appealed to the emperor, Tiberius invariably rejected the appeal, trusting Silanus' decision, and Tiberius would send the case back to him. He also had the honour of casting the first vote in the Senate. Silanus successfully persuaded Tiberius to recall the banishment of his brother Decimus.

=== Family ===
Silanus had at least two daughters, Junia Silana and Junia Claudilla. In 33, his daughter Junia Claudilla married Caligula. She died in 36 or early 37 but according to Philo, Silanus continued to treat Caligula as his own son. In November or December of 37, Caligula had him executed for unclear reasons. Suetonius claims he plotted against Caligula, while Philo and other sources claim that the emperor was simply annoyed by him.

== See also ==
- Junia gens

== Citations ==
Political offices
Preceded by Sextus Pompeius, and Sextus Appuleius as Ordinary consuls	Suffect consul of the Roman Empire; 15 with Drusus Julius Caesar	Succeeded by Sisenna Statilius Taurus, and Lucius Scribonius Libo as Ordinary consuls
