= Gaius Silius (lover of Messalina) =

Roman senator executed by the emperor Claudius for his affair with Valeria Messalina

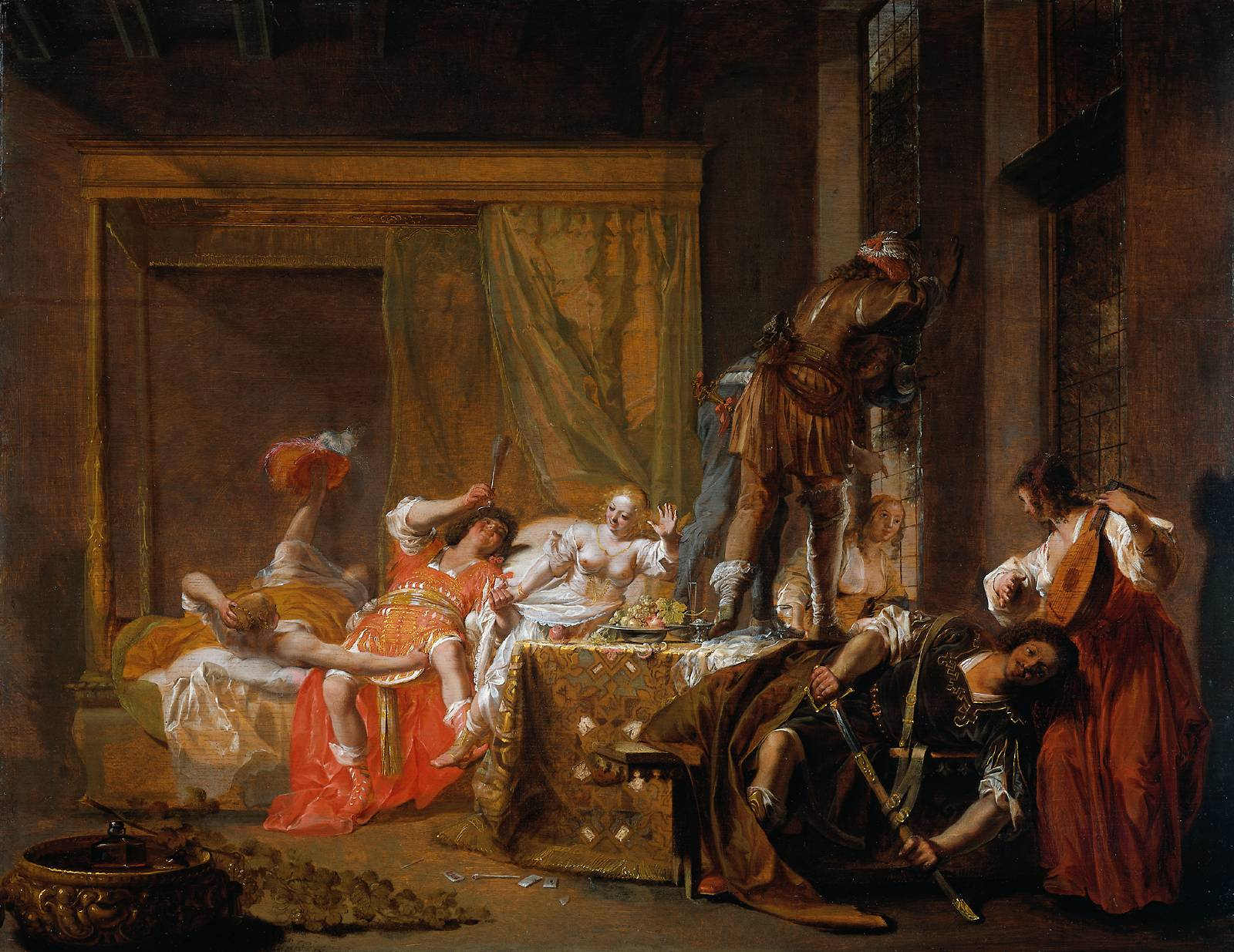
Gaius Sillius and Messalina by Nikolaus Knüpfer (c. 1650)

Gaius Silius (c. AD 13 – 48) was a Roman senator who was nominated as consul designate for 49 AD, but was executed by the emperor Claudius for his affair with the empress Valeria Messalina.

== Biography ==
The son of Gaius Silius, Silius was described by the ancient sources as an intelligent, noble and attractive man. He had married the aristocratic Junia Silana, and had been inducted into the Senate sometime shortly before 47. During this year he demanded in the Senate the enforcement of the Lex Cincia, forbidding the acceptance of money or gifts in exchange for legal services, in an attempt to bring down his enemy, Publius Suillius Rufus, who was prosecuting many of Silius' clients. The Senate agreed with this proposal, but before a formal motion could be put before the people, those intended to be prosecuted under this law, including Suillius Rufus, had successfully appealed to Claudius to amend the law by establishing a maximum fee that could be charged. Silius was then made a consul-designate in 48 (presumably for the following year).

Through the infatuation of the Empress Valeria Messalina, they had become lovers. Messalina forced him to divorce his wife to marry her, committing bigamy and marrying before witnesses, while Claudius was at Ostia. Silius was childless and wanted to adopt Britannicus. Narcissus exposed their mock marriage and the plot to kill Claudius. The Emperor ordered their executions in 48.

His former wife, whom he divorced in 47, Junia Silana, was a friend of Agrippina the Younger and the two later became bitter rivals. Likely due to the machinations of Agrippina, she was exiled and later died at Tarentum in 59.

== See also ==
- List of Roman consuls designate
- List of Roman usurpers

== Sources ==
- Smith, William, Dictionary of Greek and Roman Biography and Mythology, Vol III (1849).
