= Caligula =

Roman emperor from AD 37 to 41

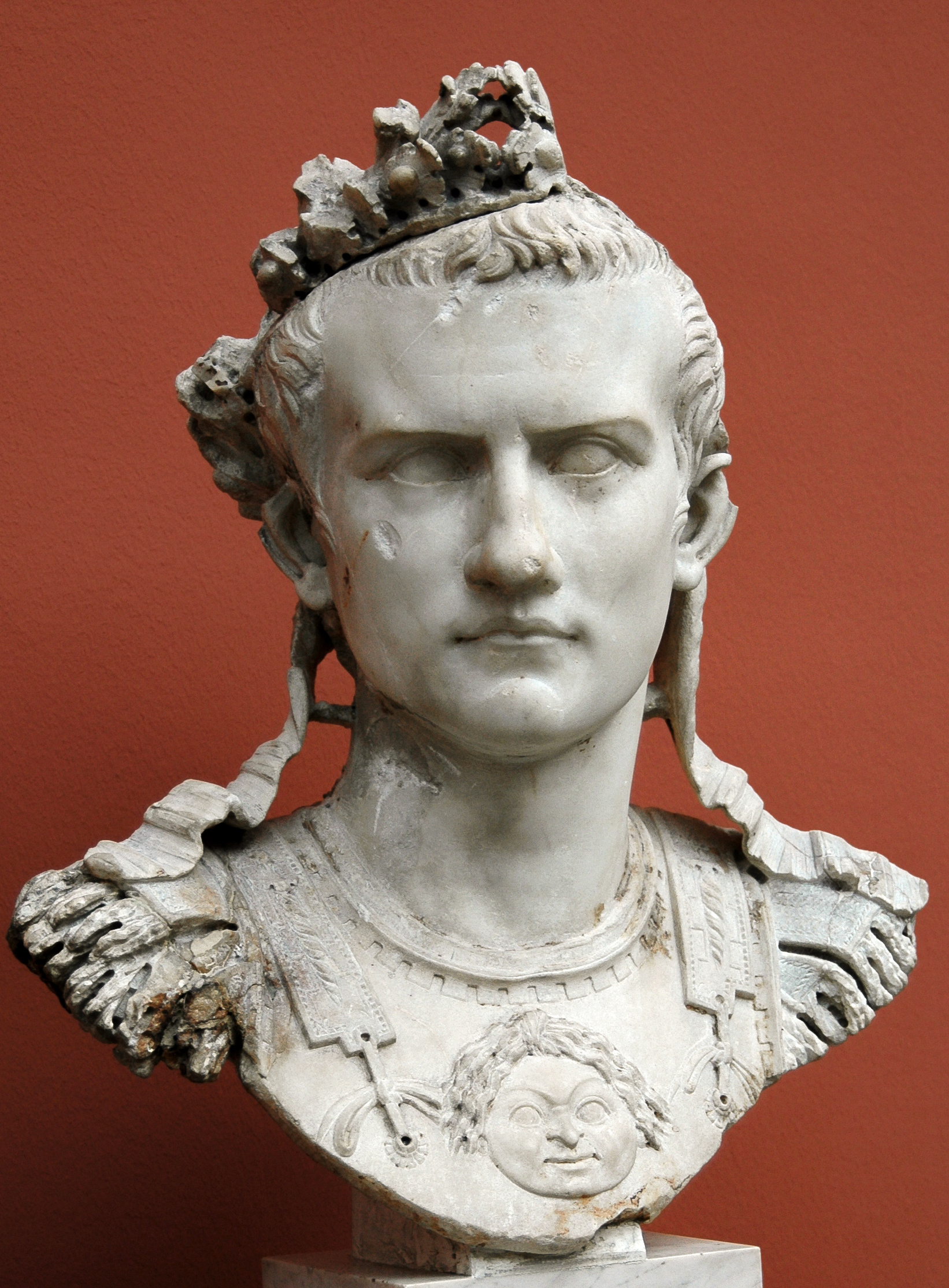
- Roman marble bust of Caligula, Ny Carlsberg Glyptotek

Roman emperor
- Reign: 16 March 37 – 24 January 41
- Predecessor: Tiberius
- Successor: Claudius
- Born: 31 August AD 12; Antium, Italy
- Died: 24 January AD 41 (aged 28); Palatine Hill, Rome, Italy
- Spouses: Junia Claudilla; Livia Orestilla; Lollia Paulina; Milonia Caesonia
- Issue: Julia Drusilla; Tiberius Gemellus (adoptive)
Names
- Gaius Julius Caesar; Gaius Caesar Germanicus
Regnal name
- Gaius Julius Caesar Augustus Germanicus
- Dynasty: Julio-Claudian
- Father: Germanicus
- Mother: Agrippina

Gaius Julius Caesar Augustus Germanicus (31 August AD 12 – 24 January AD 41), also called Gaius or Caligula (/kəˈlɪɡjʊlə/), was the third Roman emperor, ruling from AD 37 until his assassination in AD 41. He was the son of the Roman general Germanicus and Agrippina the Elder, Augustus's granddaughter, members of the first ruling family of the Roman Empire. He was born two years before Tiberius became emperor. Gaius accompanied his father, mother and siblings on campaign in Germania, at little more than four or five years old. He had been named after Gaius Julius Caesar, but his father's soldiers affectionately nicknamed him "Caligula" ('little boot'). (Note: "Caligula" is the diminutive form of caliga, a military boot.)

Germanicus died in Antioch in AD 19, and Agrippina returned with her six children to Rome, where she became entangled in a bitter feud with Emperor Tiberius, who was Germanicus' biological uncle and adoptive father. The conflict eventually led to the destruction of her family, with Caligula as the sole male survivor. In 26, Tiberius withdrew from public life to the island of Capri, and in 31, Caligula joined him there. Tiberius died in 37, and Caligula succeeded him as emperor, at the age of 24.

Of the few surviving sources about Caligula and his four-year reign, most were written by members of the nobility and Senate, long after the events they purport to describe. For the early part of his reign, he is said to have been "good, generous, fair and community-spirited", but increasingly self-indulgent, cruel, sadistic, extravagant, and sexually perverted thereafter, an insane, murderous tyrant who demanded and received worship as a living god, humiliated the Senate, and planned to make his horse, Incitatus, a consul. Most modern commentaries instead seek to explain Caligula's position, personality and historical context. Some historians dismiss many of the allegations against him as misunderstandings, exaggeration, mockery or malicious fantasy.

During his brief reign, Caligula worked to increase the unconstrained personal power of the emperor, as opposed to countervailing powers within the principate. He directed much of his attention to ambitious construction projects and public works to benefit Rome's ordinary citizens, including racetracks, theatres, amphitheatres, and improvements to roads and ports. He began the construction of two aqueducts in Rome: the Aqua Claudia and the Anio Novus. During his reign, the empire annexed the client kingdom of Mauretania as a province. He had to abandon an attempted invasion of Britain, and the installation of his statue in the Temple in Jerusalem. In early 41, Caligula was assassinated as a result of a conspiracy by officers of the Praetorian Guard, senators, and courtiers. At least some of the conspirators might have planned this as an opportunity to restore the Roman Republic and aristocratic privileges. If so, their plan was thwarted by the Praetorians, who seem to have spontaneously chosen Caligula's uncle Claudius as the next emperor. Caligula's death marked the official end of the Julii Caesares in the male line, though the Julio-Claudian dynasty continued to rule until the demise of Caligula's nephew, the Emperor Nero.

== Early life ==
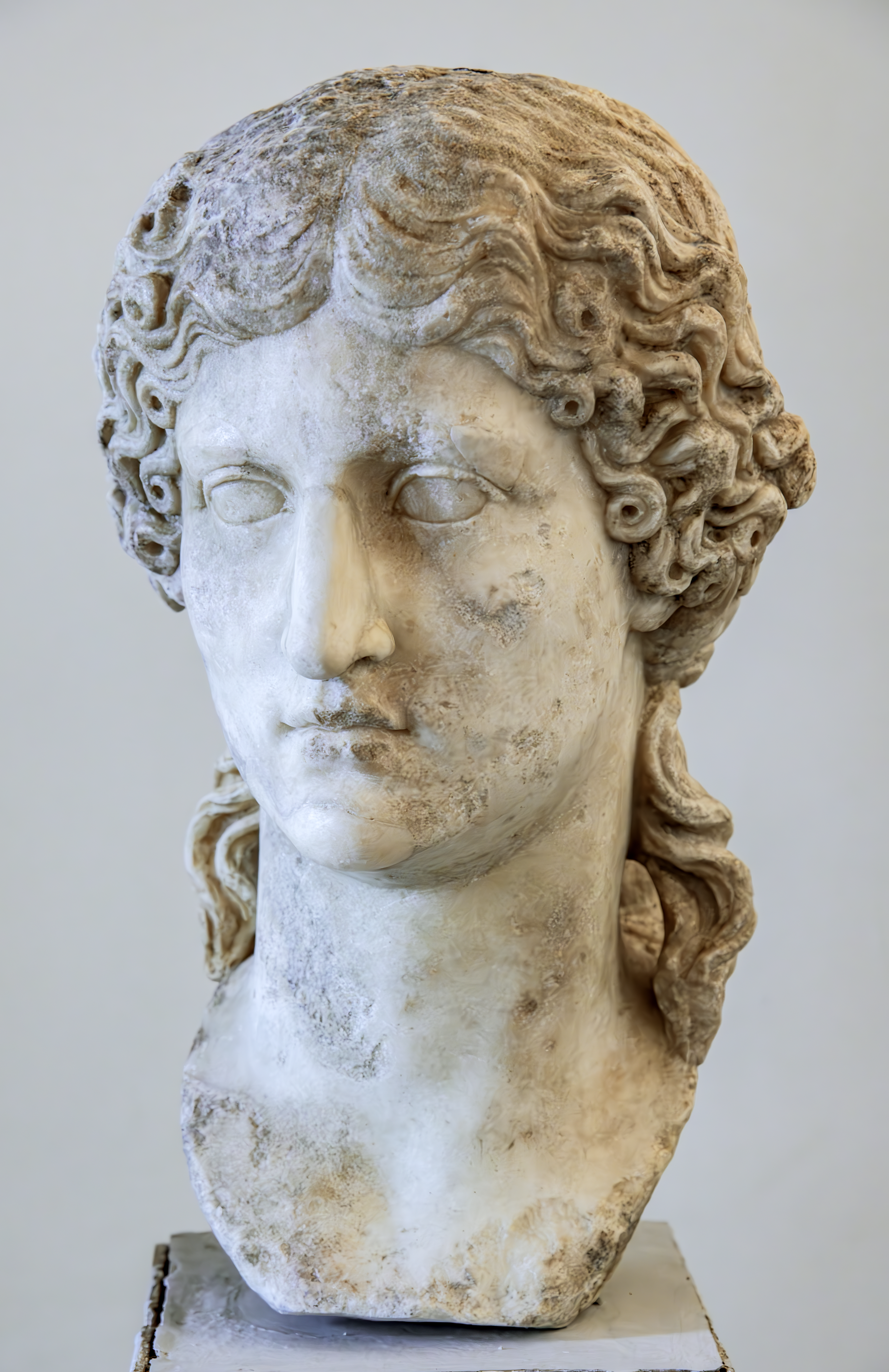
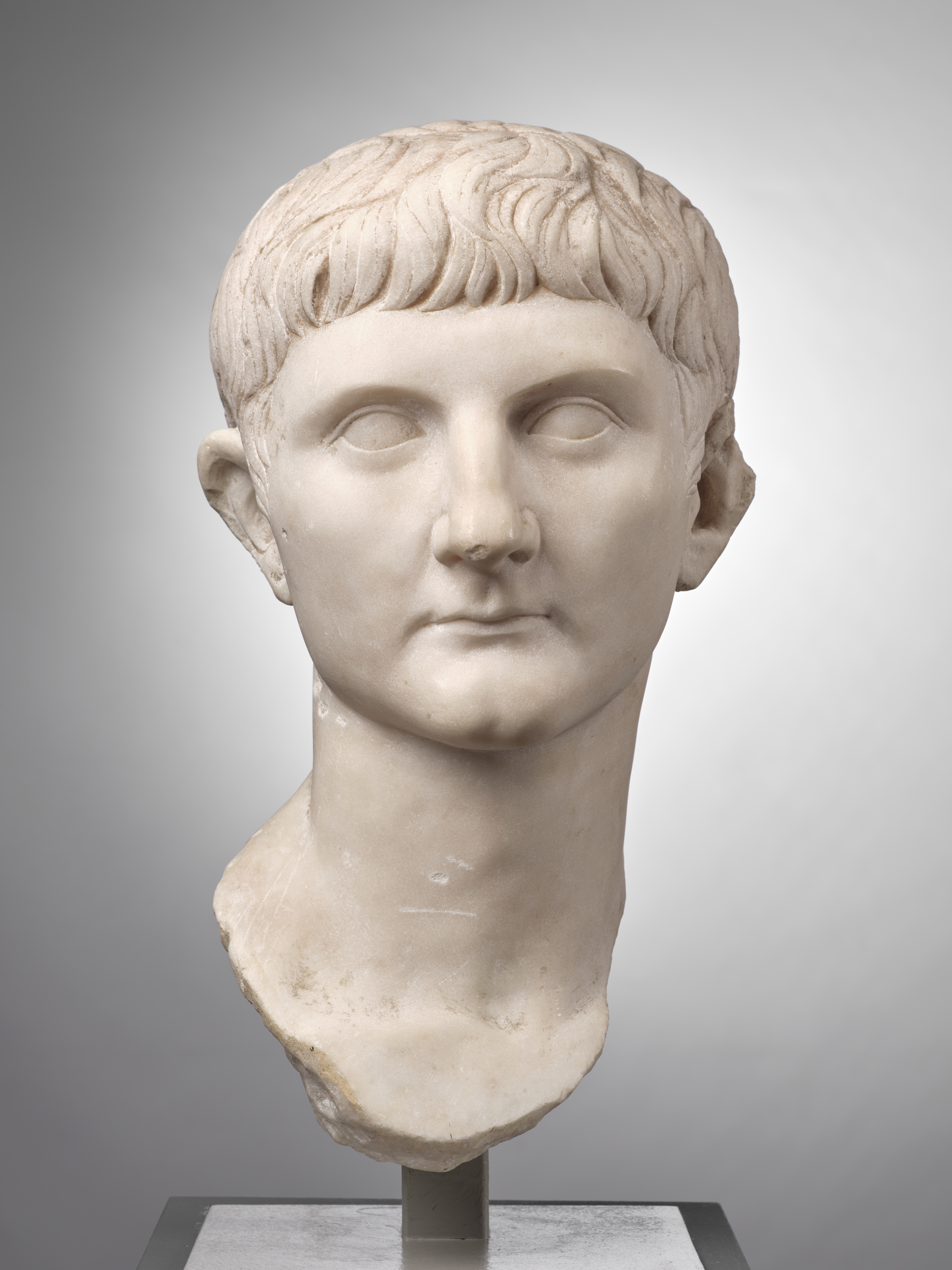
Left: Marble portrait of Agrippina, Caligula's mother
Right: Marble portrait of Germanicus, Caligula's father

Caligula was born in Antium on 31 August AD 12, the third of six surviving children of Germanicus and his wife and second cousin, Agrippina the Elder. Germanicus was a grandson of Mark Antony, and Agrippina was the daughter of Marcus Vipsanius Agrippa and Julia the Elder, making her the granddaughter of Augustus. The future emperor Claudius was Caligula's paternal uncle. Caligula had two older brothers, Nero and Drusus, and three younger sisters, Agrippina the Younger, Julia Drusilla and Julia Livilla. At the age of two or three, he accompanied his father, Germanicus, on campaigns in the north of Germania. He wore a miniature soldier's outfit, so the soldiers nicknamed him Caligula ("little army boot"). Winterling believes he would have enjoyed the attention of the soldiers, to whom he was something of a mascot, though he later grew to dislike the nickname.

Germanicus was a respected, immensely popular figure among his troops and Roman civilians of every class, and was widely expected to eventually succeed his uncle Tiberius as emperor. For his successful northern campaigns, he was awarded the great honour of a triumph. During the triumphal procession through Rome, Caligula and his siblings shared their father's chariot, and the applause of the populace. A few months later, Germanicus was despatched to tour Rome's allies and provinces with his family. They were received with great honour; at Assos Caligula gave a public speech, aged only 6. Somewhere en route, Germanicus contracted what proved to be a fatal illness. He lingered awhile, and died at Antioch, Syria, in AD 19, aged 33, convinced that he had been poisoned by the provincial governor, Gnaius Calpurnius Piso. (Note: Barrett believes his death was probably natural; Syria was a notoriously unhealthy spot, and almost a century later the emperor Trajan would die from a disease contracted there.) Many believed that he had been killed at the behest of Tiberius, as a potential rival.

Germanicus was cremated, and his ashes were taken to Rome, escorted by his wife and children, Praetorian guards, civilian mourners and senators, then placed in the Mausoleum of Augustus. Caligula lived with his mother Agrippina in Rome, in a milieu very different from that of his earlier years. Agrippina made no secret of her imperial ambitions for herself and her sons, and in consequence, her relations with Tiberius rapidly deteriorated. Tiberius believed himself under constant threat from treason, conspiracy and political rivalry. He forbade Agrippina to remarry, for fear that a remarriage would serve her personal ambition, and introduce yet another threat to himself. The last years of his principate were dominated by treason trials, whose outcomes were determined by senatorial vote. Agrippina, and Caligula's brother Nero, were tried and banished in the year 29 on charges of treason. The adolescent Caligula was sent to live with his great-grandmother (Tiberius' mother), Livia. After her death two years later, he was sent to live with his paternal grandmother Antonia Minor. In the year 30, Tiberius had Caligula's brothers, Drusus and Nero, declared public enemies by the Senate, and exiled. Caligula and his three sisters remained in Italy as hostages of Tiberius, kept under close watch.

== Capri ==
In 31, Caligula's brother Nero died in exile. Caligula was remanded to the personal care of Tiberius at Villa Jovis on Capri.

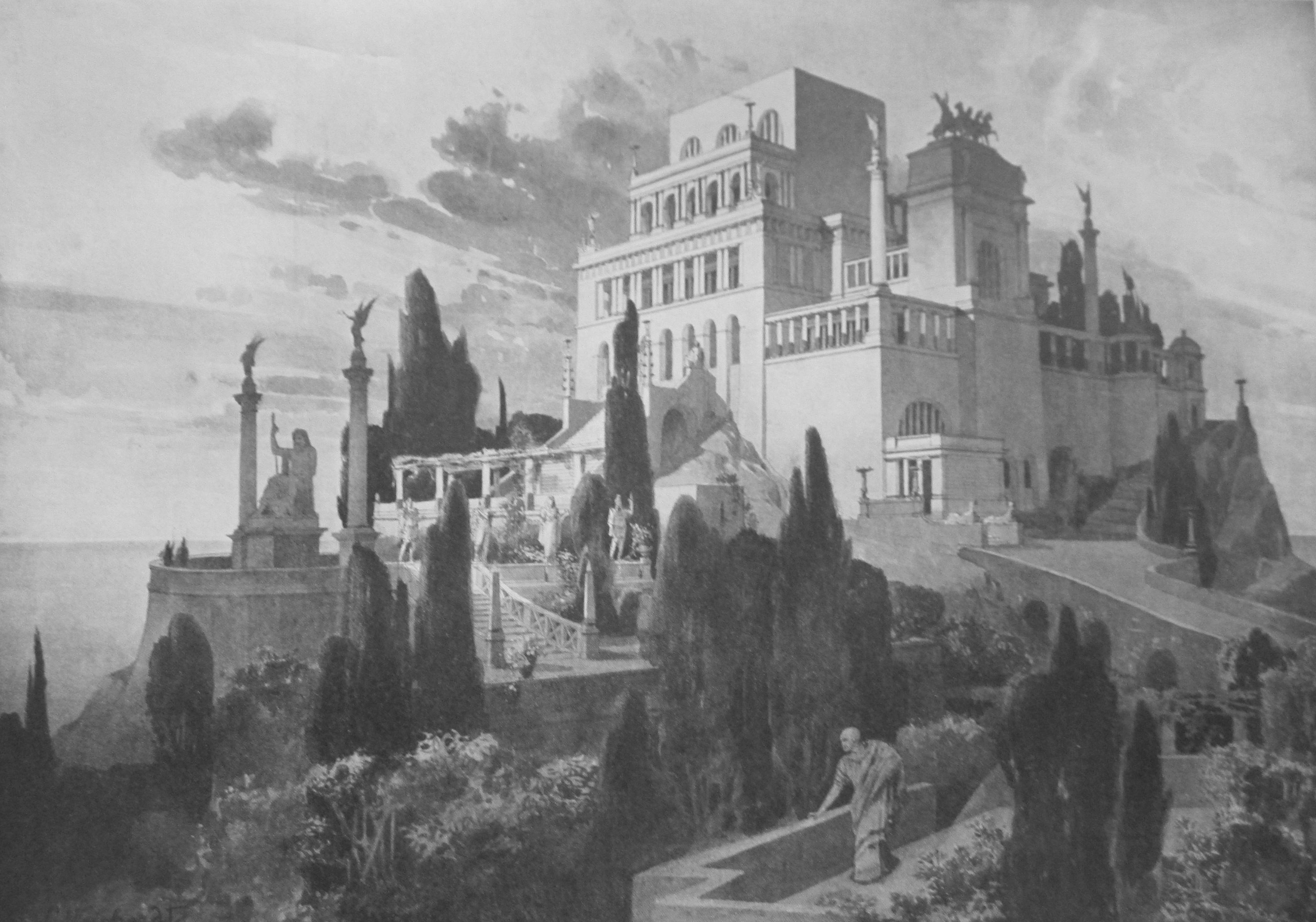
Reconstruction drawing of the Villa Jovis on Capri, where Caligula grew up at the court of Tiberius

He was befriended by Tiberius' Praetorian prefect, Naevius Sutorius Macro. Macro had been active in the downfall of Sejanus, his ambitious and manipulative predecessor in office, and was a trusted communicant between the emperor, and his senate in Rome. Philo, Jewish diplomat and later witness to several events in Caligula's court, writes that Macro protected and supported Caligula, allaying any suspicions Tiberius might harbour concerning his young ward's ambitions. Macro represented Caligula to Tiberius as "friendly, obedient" and devoted to Tiberius' grandson, Tiberius Gemellus, who was seven years younger than himself. Caligula is described during this time as a first-rate orator, well-informed, cultured and intelligent, a natural actor who recognized the danger he was in, and hid his resentment of Tiberius' maltreatment of himself and his family behind such an obsequious manner that it was said of him that there had never been "a better slave or a worse master". Caligula's failure to protest the destruction of his family is taken by Tacitus as evidence that his "monstrous character was masked by a hypocritical modesty". Winterling observes that a forthright protest would "certainly have cost him his life".

In 33, Caligula's mother and his brother Drusus died, while still in exile. In the same year, Tiberius arranged the marriage of Caligula and Junia Claudilla, daughter of one of Tiberius' most influential allies in the Senate, Marcus Junius Silanus. Caligula was given an honorary quaestorship in the cursus honorum, a series of political promotions that could lead to consulship. He would hold this very junior senatorial post until his sudden nomination as emperor. Junia died in childbirth the following year, along with her baby. In 35, Tiberius named Caligula as joint heir with Tiberius' grandson, Gemellus, who was not yet an adult. At the time, Tiberius seemed to be in good health, and likely to survive until Gemellus' majority.

In Philo's account, Tiberius was genuinely fond of Gemellus, but doubted his personal capacity to rule and feared for his safety should Caligula come to power. Suetonius claims that Tiberius, ever mistrustful but still shrewd in his mid-70s, saw through Caligula's apparent self-possession to an underlying "erratic and unreliable" temperament, not one to be trusted in government; and he claims that Caligula took pleasure in cruelty, torture, and sexual vice of every kind. Tiberius is said to have indulged the young man's appetite for theatre, dance and singing, in the hope that this would help soften his otherwise savage nature; "he used to say now and then that to allow Gaius to live would prove the ruin of himself and of all men, and that he was rearing a viper for the Roman people and a Phaethon for the world." Winterling points out that this judgment draws on later, not particularly accurate accounts of Caligula's rule; Suetonius credits Tiberius with a knowledge of human nature which in reality was not only foreign to him, but famously unsound. At Capri, Caligula learned to dissimulate. He probably owed his life to that and, as all the ancient sources agree, to Macro. (Note: Suetonius and others provide what may be an accurate depiction of Tiberius' complete but mistaken trust in Sejanus, and his mistrust of all others until Sejanus' conspiracy was discovered.) Many believed, or claimed to believe, that given a little more time, Tiberius would have eliminated Caligula as a possible successor, but died before this could be done.

== Emperor ==
=== Early reign ===
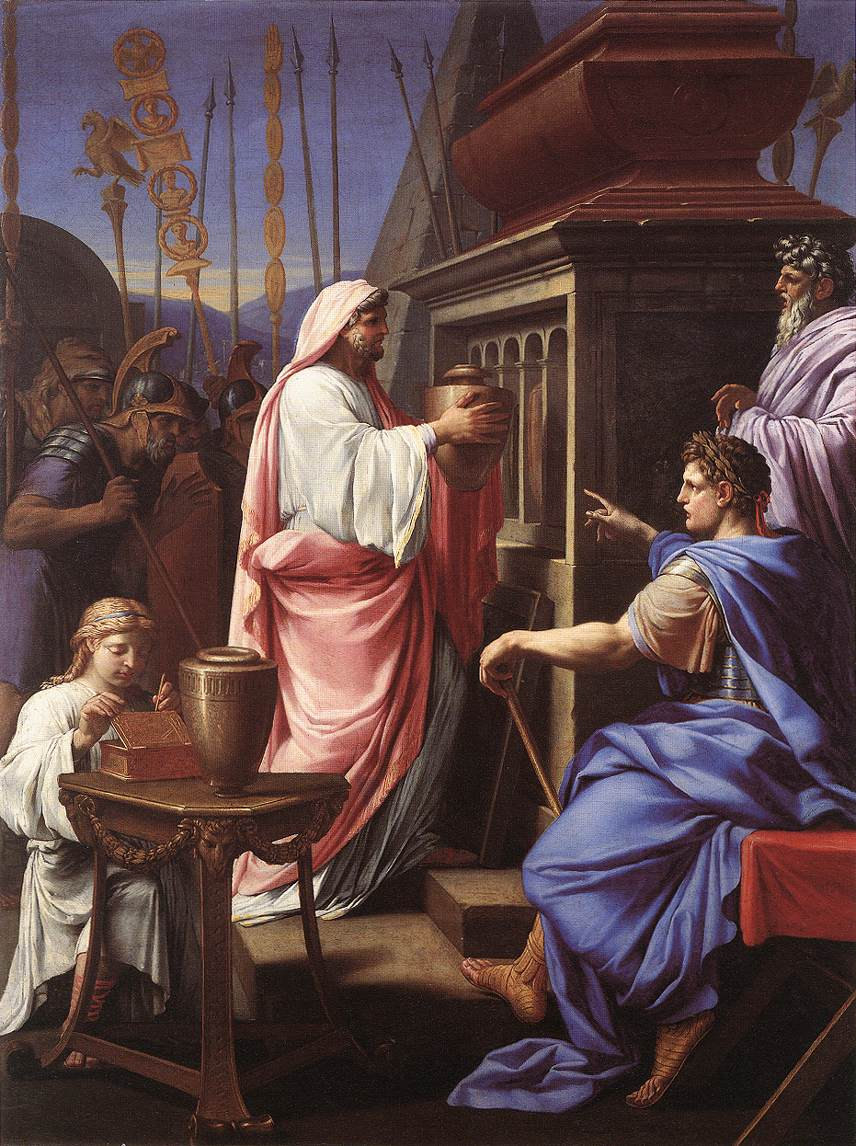
Caligula Depositing the Ashes of his Mother and Brother in the Tomb of his Ancestors, by Eustache Le Sueur, 1647.

Tiberius died on 16 March AD 37, a day before the Liberalia festival. He was 77 years old. Suetonius, Tacitus, and Cassius Dio repeat variously elaborated rumours which held that Caligula, perhaps with Macro, was directly responsible for his death. Philo and Josephus, the latter a Romano-Jewish writer who served Vespasian a generation later, describe Tiberius' death as natural. On the same day, Caligula was hailed as emperor by members of the Praetorian guard at Misenum. His leadership of the domus Caesaris ("Caesar's household") as its sole heir and pater familias was ratified by the senate, who acclaimed him imperator two days after the death of Tiberius. Caligula entered Rome on 28 or 29 March, and with the consensus of "the three orders" (senate, equestrians and common citizens) the Senate conferred on him the "right and power to decide on all affairs". Caligula was the first emperor to acquire all of his powers at once rather than over the course of his reign like Augustus and Tiberius.

==== Princeps ====
In a single day, and with a single piece of legislation, the 25-year-old Caligula, previously a virtual unknown in Rome's political life, and with no military service, was thus granted the same trappings, authority and powers that Augustus had accumulated piecemeal, over a lifetime and sometimes reluctantly. Until his first formal meeting with the Senate, Caligula refrained from using the titles they had granted him. His studied deference must have gone some way to reassure the more astute that he should prove amenable to their guidance. Some must have resented the political manipulations that led to this extraordinary settlement. Caligula was now entitled to make, break or ignore any laws he chose. Augustus had shown, and Tiberius had failed to realise, that the roles of primus inter pares ("first among equals") and princeps legibus solutus ("a princeps not bound by the laws") required the exercise of personal responsibility, self-restraint, and above all, tact — as if the Senate still held the power they had voluntarily surrendered. In the words of scholar Anthony A. Barrett, "Caligula would be restrained only by his own sense of discretion, which became in lamentably short supply as his reign progressed".

Caligula dutifully asked the Senate to approve divine honours for his predecessor but was turned down, in line with senatorial and popular opinion regarding the dead emperor's worth. Caligula did not push the issue; he had made the necessary gesture of filial respect. Tiberius' will named two heirs, Caligula and Gemellus, but the latter was still a minor, and could not hold any kind of office. The will was annulled with the standard justification that Tiberius must have been insane when he composed it, incapable of good judgment. Although Tiberius' will had been legally set aside, Caligula honoured many of its terms, and in some cases, improved on them. Tiberius had provided each praetorian guardsman with a generous gratitude payment of 500 sesterces. Caligula doubled this, and took credit for its payment as an act of personal generosity; he also paid bonuses to the city troops and the army outside Italy. (Note: Various coin issues suggest the payment of regular donations to the praetorians throughout Caligula's reign.) Every citizen in Rome was given 150 sesterces, and heads of households twice that amount. Building projects on the Palatine hill and elsewhere were also announced, which would have been the largest of these expenditures.

Owing to Macro's preparations on his behalf, Caligula's accession was described as a "brilliantly stage-managed affair". The legions had already sworn loyalty to Caligula as their imperator. Now Caligula gave the notoriously frugal Tiberius a magnificent funeral at public expense, and a tearful eulogy, and met with an ecstatic popular reception along the funeral route and in Rome itself. Among Caligula's first acts as emperor was the provision of public games on a grand scale. Philo describes Caligula in these early days as universally admired. Suetonius writes that Caligula was loved by many, for being the beloved son of the popular Germanicus. According to him, three months of public celebrations marked the start of a new reign. Philo describes the first seven months of Caligula's reign as a "Golden Age" of happiness and prosperity. Josephus claims that in the first two years of his reign, Caligula's "high-minded... even-handed" rule earned him goodwill throughout the Empire.

Caligula took up his first consulship on 1 July, two months after his succession. He accepted all titles and honours offered him except pater patriae ("father of the fatherland"), which had been conferred on Augustus. Caligula refused it, protesting his youth, until 21 September 37. He commemorated his own father, Germanicus, with portraits on coinage, adopted his name, and renamed the month of September after him. He granted his sisters and his grandmother Antonia Minor extraordinary privileges, normally reserved for the Vestals, and female priesthoods of the deified Augustus; their powers were entirely ceremonial, not executive, but their names were included in the standard formulas used in the senate house to invoke divine blessings on debates and proceedings, and the annual prayers for the safety of emperor and state. Caligula named his favourite sister, Drusilla, as heir to his imperium. Oaths were sworn in the name of Caligula, and his entire family. One of his sesterces not only identifies each sister by name, but associates her with a particular imperial virtue; "security", "concord" or "fortune". Caligula ordered that an image of his deceased mother, Agrippina, must accompany all festival processions. He made his uncle Claudius his consular colleague, tasked with siting statues of Caligula's two dead brothers, and occasionally standing in for Caligula at games, feasts and ceremonies. Claudius' own family found his limp and stammer "something of a public embarrassment"; he mismanaged the statue commission and his first consulship ended soon after, alongside Caligula's but his appointment elevated him from mere equestrian to senator, and eligible for consulship. Barrett and Yardley describe Claudius' consulship as an "astonishingly enlightened gesture" on Caligula's part, not one of Caligula's attempts to court popularity, as Suetonius would have it.

Caligula made a public show of burning Tiberius' secret papers, which gave details of his infamous treason trials. They included accusations of villainy and betrayal against various senators, many of whom had willingly assisted in prosecutions of their own number to gain financial advantage, imperial favour, or to divert suspicion away from themselves; any expression of dissatisfaction with the emperor's rule or decisions could be taken as undermining the State, and lead to prosecution for maiestas (treason). Caligula claimed – falsely, as it later turned out – that he had read none of these documents before burning them. He used a coin issue to advertise his claim that he had restored the security of the laws, which had suffered during Tiberius' prolonged absence from Rome; he reduced a backlog of court cases in Rome by adding more jurors and suspending the requirement that sentences be confirmed by imperial office.

Stressing his descent from Augustus, Caligula retrieved the remains of his mother and brothers from their places of exile for interment in the Mausoleum of Augustus. Caligula began work on a temple to Livia, widow of Augustus; she held the honorific title of Augusta while still living, and when she died was eventually made a diva (goddess) of the Roman state under Claudius. The temple had been vowed in her lifetime, but not constructed.

==== Illness and recovery ====
Between approximately mid-October and mid-November 37, Caligula fell seriously ill through unknown causes and hovered for a month or so between life and death. Rome's public places filled with citizens who implored the gods for his recovery, some even offering their own lives in exchange. By late October, their emperor had recovered, and embarked on what might have been a purge of suspected opponents or conspirators. Caligula's relations with his senate had been congenial but were now sullied by the forced suicide, for reasons unknown, of the eminent senator Silanus, formerly Caligula's father-in-law. Gemellus, Caligula's adopted son and heir, now 18 years old and legally adult, was also disposed of. Suetonius offers several versions of Gemellus' death. In one, Gemellus was given the adult toga virilis then charged with having taken an antidote, "implicitly accusing Caligula of wanting to poison him", and forced to kill himself. Several months later, in early 38, Caligula forced suicide on his Praetorian Prefect, Macro, without whose help and protection he would not have survived, let alone gained the throne as sole ruler. Any link between the deaths is speculative, but it is possible that Silanus had conspired to make Gemellus emperor, should Caligula fail to recover, and Caligula might simply have tired of Macro's control and influence.

In 38, Caligula nominated Marcus Aemilius Lepidus as his heir, and married him to his beloved sister Drusilla, but on 19 June that year, Drusilla died. She was deified and renamed Panthea ("All Goddesses"); the first mortal woman in Roman history to be made a diva (goddess of state). Caligula, bereft, declared a period of compulsory, universal mourning. Drusilla's death is one of several events approximate to the time of Caligula's illness, besides the death of Antonia and any unreported effects of the illness itself, thought by some to contribute to a fundamental change in Caligula's attitudes. Purges so early in Caligula's reign suggest to Weidemann that "the new emperor had learnt a great deal from Tiberius" and "that attempts to divide his reign into a 'good' beginning followed by unremitting atrocities [...] are misplaced".

=== Public profile ===
Caligula shared many of the popular passions and enthusiasms of the lower classes and young aristocrats: public spectacles, particularly gladiator contests chariot and horse racing, the theatre and gambling, but all on a scale which the nobility could not match. He trained with professional gladiators and staged exceptionally lavish gladiator games, being granted exemption by the senate from the sumptuary laws that limited the number of gladiators to be kept in Rome. He was openly and vocally partisan in his uninhibited support or disapproval of particular charioteers, racing teams, gladiators and actors, shouting encouragement or scorn, sometimes singing along with paid performers or declaiming the actors' lines, and generally behaving as "one of the crowd". In gladiator contests, he supported the parmularius type, who fought using small, round shields. In chariot races, he supported the Greens, and personally drove his favourite racehorse Incitatus ("Speedy") as a member of the Green faction. Most of Rome's aristocracy would have found this an unprecedented, unacceptable indignity for any of their number, let alone their emperor.

Caligula showed little respect for distinctions of rank, status or privilege among the senate, whose members Tiberius had once described as "men ready to be slaves". Among those whom Caligula recalled from exile were actors and other public performers who had somehow caused Tiberius offence. Caligula seems to have built a loyal following among his own loyal freedmen, citizen-commoners, disreputable public performers on whom he lavished money and other gifts; and the lower nobility (equestrians) rather than the senators and nobles whom he clearly and openly mistrusted, despised and humiliated for their insincere simulations of loyalty. Dio notes, with approval, that Caligula allowed some equestrians senatorial honours, anticipating their later promotion to senator based on their personal merits. To reverse declining membership of the equestrian order, Caligula recruited new, wealthy members empire-wide, and scrupulously vetted the order's membership lists for signs of dishonesty or scandal. He seems to have ignored trivial misdemeanours, and would have anticipated the creation of "new men" (novi homines), first of their families to serve as senators. They would owe him a debt of gratitude and loyalty for their advancement.

Barrett describes some of the supposed equestrian offences punished by Caligula as "decidedly trivial", and their punishments as sensationalist. Dio claims that Caligula had more than 26 equestrians executed in a circus "fracas"; in Suetonius' biography "more than 20" lives were lost in what is almost certainly the same event, described as a violent but accidental crush. Some sources claim that Caligula forced equestrians and senators to fight in the arena as gladiators. Condemnation to the gladiator arena as a combatant was a standard punishment, doubling as public entertainment, for non-citizens found guilty of certain offences. Laws of AD 19 by Augustus and Tiberius banned voluntary participation of the elite in any public spectacles, but the ban was never particularly effective, and was broadly ignored in Caligula's reign. During Caligula's illness two citizens, an equestrian named Atanius Secundus and a plebeian named Publius Afranius Potitus, offered to fight as a gladiator and take their own life if only the gods would spare the emperor's life. The offers were insincere, intended to flatter and invite reward. When Caligula recovered, he insisted that they be taken at face value, to avoid accusations of perjury: "cynical, but not without wit of a kind".

=== Public reform and finance ===
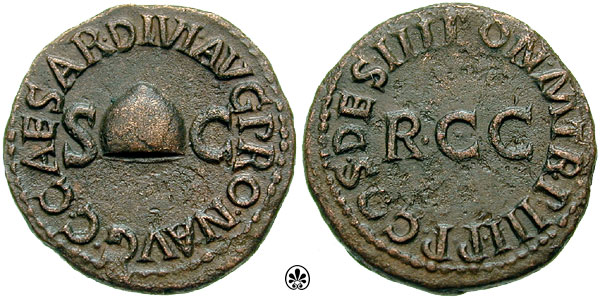
Quadrans celebrating the abolition of a tax in AD 38 by Caligula. The obverse of the coin contains a picture of a Pileus which symbolizes the liberation of the people from the tax burden. Inscription: c caesar divi avg pron avg / pon m, pp cos des rcc.

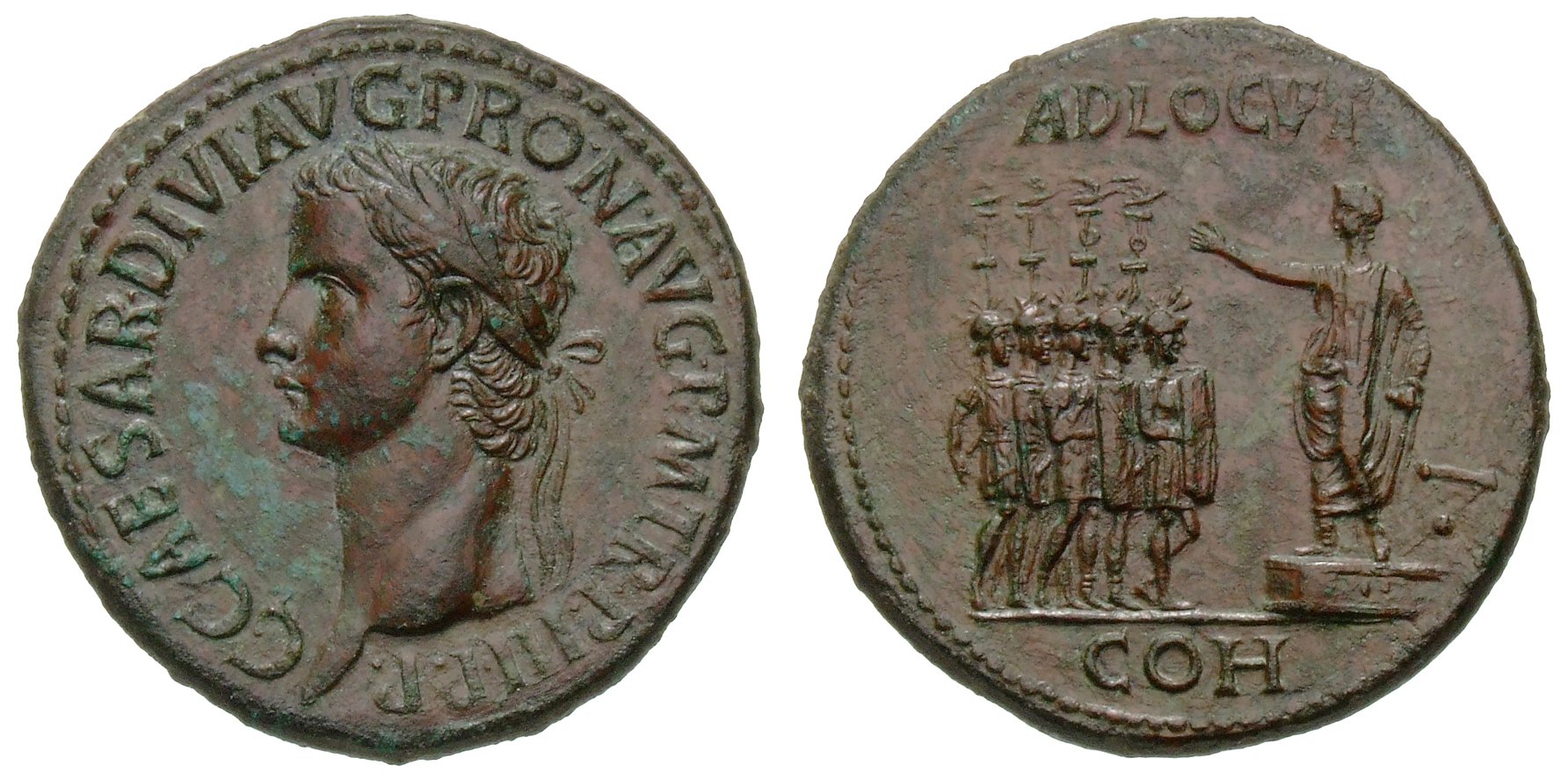
The adlocutio cohortium of Caligula on a coin, giving a speech to the army

In 38, Caligula lifted censorship, and published accounts of public funds and expenditure. Suetonius congratulates this as the first such act by any emperor. (Note: In fact, Tiberius had published the imperial accounts once, and Augustus had done so twice. Caligula's publication was thought a highly creditable act, but he did not repeat it.) Very soon after his succession, he restored the right of the popular assembly (comitia) to elect magistrates on behalf of the common citizenry, a right that had been taken over by the Senate under Tiberius and Augustus. The aediles, elected officials who managed public games and festivals, and maintained the fabric of roads and shrines, would now have incentive to spend their own money on lavish, high-profile spectacles and other munera (gifts to the state or people), to win the popular vote. Dio writes that this, "though delighting the rabble, grieved the sensible, who stopped to reflect, that if the offices should fall once more into the hands of the many... many disasters would result". When the Senate outright refused to accept this, Caligula restored control of elections to them. Either way, the emperor ultimately chose which candidates stood for election, and which were elected. Caligula was quite capable of recognising his own plans and decisions as flawed, and abandoning, revising or reversing them when faced with opposition. He was open to good advice, but could just as easily take its offering as an insult to his youth or understanding – Philo quotes his warning "Who dares teach me?" Caligula abandoned his plan to convert the Temple of Jerusalem to a temple of the Imperial cult, with a statue of himself as Zeus, when warned that the plan would arouse extreme protests, and injure the local economy. (Note: Jewish grain producers had threatened to fire their fields if Caligula's plan went ahead. This would have caused a local grain famine during Caligula's planned visit to Alexandria.) He gave funds where they were needed; he helped those who lost property in fires, and abolished a deeply unpopular tax on sales, but whether his extravagant gifts to favourites during his earliest reign – be they actors, charioteers or other public performers – drew on his personal wealth or state coffers is not known. Personal generosity and magnanimity, coupled with discretion and responsibility, were expected of the ruling elite, and the emperor in particular. At some time, Caligula ruled that bequests to office-holders remain property of the office, not of the office-holder.

==== Tax and treasury ====
Suetonius claims that Caligula squandered 2.7 billion sesterces in his first year and addressed the consequent treasury deficit by confiscating the estates of wealthy individuals, after false accusations, fines or outright seizure, even the death penalty, as a means of raising money. This seems to have started in earnest around the time of Caligula's confrontation with the senate (in early 39). Suetonius's retrospective balance sheet overlooks what would have been owed to Caligula, personally and in his capacity as emperor, on Tiberius' death, and the release of the former emperor's hoarded wealth into the economy at large. Caligula's inheritance included the deceased empress Livia's vast bequest, which Caligula distributed among its nominated public, private and religious beneficiaries. Barrett in Caligula: The Abuse of Power asserts that this "massive cash injection would have given the Roman economy a tremendous boost".

Dio remarks the beginnings of a financial crisis in 39, and connects it to the cost of Caligula's extravagant bridge-building project at Baiae. Suetonius has presumably the same financial crisis starting in 38; he does not mention a bridge but lists a broad range of Caligula's extravagances, said to have exhausted the state treasury.

To Wilkinson, Caligula's uninterrupted use of precious metals in coin issues does not suggest a bankrupt treasury, though there must have been a blurring of boundaries between Caligula's personal wealth, and his income as head of state. Caligula's immediate successor, Claudius, abolished taxes, embarked on various costly building projects and donated 15,000 sesterces to each Praetorian Guard in 41 as his own reign began, which suggests that Caligula had left him a solvent treasury.

In the long term, the occasional windfall aside, Caligula's spending exceeded his income. Fund-raising through taxation became a major preoccupation. Provincial citizens were liable for direct payment of taxes used to fund the military, a payment from which Italians were exempt. Caligula abolished some taxes, including the deeply unpopular sales tax, but he introduced an unprecedented range of new ones, and rather than employ professional tax farmers (publicani) in their collection, he made this a duty of the notoriously forceful Praetorian Guard. Dio and Suetonius describe these taxes as "shameful": some were remarkably petty. Caligula taxed "taverns, artisans, slaves and the hiring of slaves", edibles sold in the city, litigation anywhere in the Empire, weddings or marriages, the wages of porters "or perhaps couriers", and most infamously, a tax on prostitutes (active, retired or married) or their pimps, liable for "a sum equivalent to a single transaction". Citizens of provincial Italy lost their previous tax exemptions. Most individual tax bills were fairly small but cumulative; over Caligula's brief reign, taxes were doubled overall. Even then, the revenue was nowhere near enough, and the imposition was deeply resented by Rome's commoners. Josephus claims that this led to riotous protests at the Circus. Barrett remarks that stories of consequent "mass executions" there by the military should "almost certainly" be dismissed as "standard exaggeration".

Property or money left to Tiberius as emperor but not collected on his death would have passed to Caligula as office-holder. Roman inheritance law recognised a legator's obligation to provide for his family; Caligula seems to have considered his fatherly duties to the state entitled him to a share of every will from pious subjects. The army was not exempt; centurions who left nothing or too little to the emperor could be judged guilty of ingratitude, and have their wills set aside. Centurions who had acquired property by plunder were forced to turn over their spoils to the state.

Stories of a brothel in the Imperial palace, staffed by Roman aristocrats, matrons and their children, are taken literally by Suetonius and Dio; McGinn believes they could be based on a single incident, extended to an institution in the telling. Similar allegations would be made in the future against Commodus and Elagabalus. Winterling, citing Dio 59.28.9, traces the outline of the story to Cassius Dio's account for AD 40, and his allegation that the noble tenants of newly built suites of rooms at the palace were compelled to pay exorbitant rents for the privilege of living so close to Caligula, and under the protection of the praetorians. No brothel is mentioned in this account. Suetonius appears to reverse the traditional aristocratic client-patron ceremonies of mutual obligation, and have Caligula accepting payments for maintenance from his loyal consular "friends" at morning salutations, evening banquets, and bequest announcements. The sheer numbers of "friends" involved meant that meticulous records were kept of who had paid, how much, and who still owed. His agents would then visit the very same consuls who had been involved in conspiracies against him, rail against the Senate's treachery en masse but ask for "gifts" from individuals to express their loyal friendship in return. A refusal was unthinkable. Winterling describes the families who occupied these rooms as hostage, under the supervision of the Praetorians; some paid up willingly, some reluctantly, but all paid. Caligula made loans available at high interest to those who lacked the necessary funds, to complete the humiliation of Rome's elite, especially the old Republican families.

Despite his biographers' attempts to ridicule Caligula's taxes, many were continued after his death. The military remained responsible for all tax collection, and the tax on prostitution continued up to the reign of Severus Alexander. Caligula's ruling that bequests made to any reigning emperor became property of his office, not himself as a private individual, was made constitutional under Antoninus Pius.

==== Coinage ====
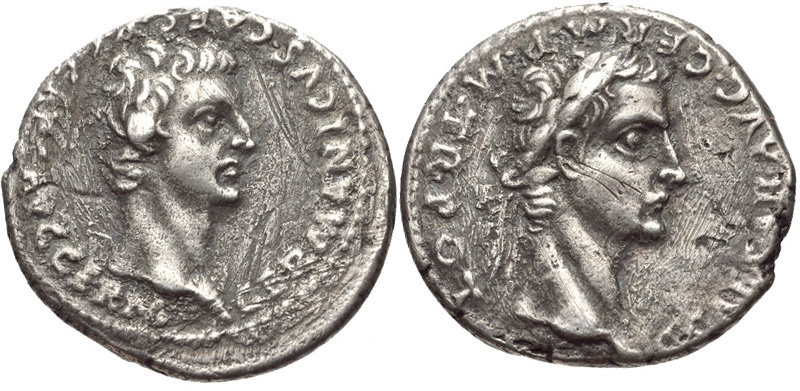
Roman denarius, AD 37–38. The reverse (left) shows Germanicus, the obverse (right) shows the laureate head of Caligula. Caption: GERMANICVS CAES P C CAES AVG GERM / C. CAESAR GERM P. M. TR. POT.

Caligula did not change the structure of the monetary system established by Augustus and continued by Tiberius, but the contents of his coinage differed from theirs. The location of the imperial mint for the coins of precious metals (gold and silver) is a matter of debate among ancient numismatists. It seems that Caligula initially produced his precious coins from Lugdunum (now Lyon, France), like his predecessors, then moved the mint to Rome in 37–38, although it is possible that this move occurred later, under Nero. His base metal coinage was struck in Rome.

Unlike Tiberius, whose coins remained almost unchanged throughout his reign, Caligula used a variety of types, mostly featuring Divus Augustus, as well as his parents Germanicus and Agrippina, his dead brothers Nero and Drusus, and his three sisters Agrippina, Drusilla, and Livilla. The reason for the extensive emphasis on his relatives was to highlight Caligula's double claim to the Principate, from both the Julian and Claudian sides of the dynasty, and to call for the unity of the family. The sesterce with his three sisters was discontinued after 39, due to Caligula's suspicion regarding their loyalty. He also made a sesterce celebrating the Praetorian cohorts as a mean to give them the bequest of Tiberius at the beginning of his reign. Caligula minted a quadrans, a small bronze coin, to mark the abolition of the ducentesima, a 0.5% tax on sales. The output of the precious metal mints was small and his sesterces were mostly made in limited quantities, which make his coins now very rare. This rarity cannot be attributed to Caligula's alleged damnatio memoriae reported by Dio, as removing his coins from circulation would have been impossible; besides, Mark Antony's coins continued to circulate for two centuries after his death. Caligula's common coins are base metal types with Vesta, Germanicus, and Agrippina the Elder, and the most common is an as with his grandfather Agrippa. Finally, Caligula kept open the mint at Caesarea in Cappadocia, which had been created by Tiberius, in order to pay military expenses in the province with silver drachmae.

Numismatists Harold Mattingly and Edward Sydenham consider that the artistic style of Caligula's coins is below those of Tiberius and Claudius; they especially criticize the portraits, which are too hard and lack details.

=== Construction ===
Caligula had a fondness for grandiose, costly building projects, many of which were intended to benefit or entertain the general population but are described in Roman sources as wasteful. In the city of Rome, he completed the temple of Augustus and the reconstruction of the theatre of Pompey. He is said to have built a bridge between the temple of Castor and Pollux and the Capitol. (Note: By a modern calculation, it would have spanned a distance of 250.m, and risen to 35 m. above ground level to clear the intervening temple of Augustus.) Barrett (2015) believes that this bridge existed only in Suetonius' account, and should perhaps be dismissed as a fantasy, with possible origins in some jocular remark by Caligula.

Caligula began an amphitheatre beside the Saepta Julia; he cleared the latter space for use as an arena, and filled it with water for a single naumachia (a sham naval battle fought as entertainment). He supervised the extension and rebuilding of the imperial palace to include a gallery for his art collection. Philo and his party were given a tour of the gallery during their diplomatic visit. Barrett (2015) considers Philo's description of Caligula as a "would-be connoisseur and aesthete" as "probably not very wide of the mark." To help meet Rome's burgeoning demand for fresh water, he began the construction of aqueducts Aqua Claudia and Anio Novus, which Pliny the Elder considered to be engineering marvels. He built a large racetrack, now known as the Circus of Gaius and Nero. In its central spine he incorporated an Egyptian obelisk, now known as the Vatican obelisk, which he had brought by sea on a gigantic, purpose-built ship, which used 120,000 modi of lentils as ballast. (Note: The ship proved impractical to use in the grain trade and was eventually submerged and filled with concrete to form a harbour mole and lighthouse foundation, as part of Claudius' expansion of Rome's harbour at Ostia.)

At Syracuse, he repaired the city walls and temples. He pushed to keep roads in good condition throughout the empire, and extended the existing network: to this end, Caligula investigated the financial affairs of current and past highway commissioners. Those guilty of negligence, embezzlement or misuse of funds were forced to repay what they had dishonestly used for other purposes, or fulfil their commissions at their own expense. Caligula planned to rebuild the palace of Polycrates at Samos, to finish the temple of Didymaean Apollo at Ephesus, and house his own cult and image there: and to found a city high up in the Alps. He intended to dig a canal through the Isthmus of Corinth in Greece and sent a chief centurion to survey the site. None of these plans came to fruition.

=== Treason trials ===
In the course of 39, Caligula's increasingly tense relationship with his Senate deteriorated into outright hostility and confrontation. This is one of Dio's more confusing accounts, involving conspiracies, denunciations and trials for treason (maiestas), following Caligula's launch of invective at the entire senate, reviewing and condemning their current and past behaviour. Winterling believes a conspiracy was uncovered in which many senators participated. He accused them of servility, treachery and hypocrisy in voting honours to Tiberius and Sejanus while they lived, and rescinding those honours once their recipients were safely dead. He declared that it would be folly to seek the love or approval of such men: they hated him, and wanted him dead, so it would be better that they should fear him. Caligula's diatribes exposed the idealised princeps or First Senator as illusion and imposture. When the senate returned next day, they seemed to confirm his suspicions, and voted him a special guard of armed pretorians to protect him and guard his statues. Apparently seeking to please him and assure his safety, the Senate proposed that his senatorial chair be raised "on a high platform even in the very Senate house". They offered a thanksgiving to Caligula, as to a monarch, expressing gratitude for allowing them to live when others had died. Winterling suggests that Caligula's three subsequent consulships, sworn at the Rostra, were vain attempts to make amends, public statements of respect for the senators as his equals. Barrett perceives these later consulships as symbolic of Caligula's continued intention to dominate the senate and the state; (Note: Caligula stepped down soon after each award of consulship, to allow a suffect consul to replace him. In effect, this made consulship a gift of the emperor.) Barrett describes the change in Caligula's rule as a gradual unravelling, a "descent into serious mismanagement and impenetrable mistrust" – and, latterly, into "arbitrary terror"; but Dio's claim that in fact, "there was nothing but slaughter" is undermined by evidence that most senators managed to survive Caligula's reign with their persons and fortunes intact.

Caligula had not, after all, destroyed Tiberius' records of treason trials. He reviewed them and decided that numerous senators discharged from Tiberius' court hearings seemed to have been guilty of conspiracy all along, against emperor and state – the worst form of laesa maiestas (treason). Tiberius' treason trials had encouraged professional delatores (informers), who were loathed by the populace, but many of the accused had testified against each other, and against Caligula's own family, even to the point of initiating the prosecutions themselves. If they had acted against Caligula's family, they might act against Caligula himself. New investigations were launched; Dio names five once-trusted, consular senators tried for laesa maiestas, but his allegation that senators or others were put to death in "great numbers" is unsupported. Two of the five prospered under his rule, and beyond. Caligula preferred to publicly humiliate his enemies in the senate, especially those of ancient families, by stripping them of their inherited honours, dignities and titles. In early September, he dismissed the two suffect consuls, citing their inadequate, low-key celebration of his birthday (31 August) and excessive attention to the anniversary of the Battle of Actium (2 September). This was the last battle in a damaging civil war between two of Caligula's close ancestors, which he found no cause for celebration. One of the dismissed consuls killed himself: Caligula may have suspected him of conspiracy.

==== Incitatus ====
Suetonius and Dio outline Caligula's supposed proposal to promote his favourite racehorse, Incitatus ('Swift'), to consul, and later, a priest of his own cult. This could have been an extended joke, created by Caligula himself in mockery of the senate. A persistent, popular belief that Caligula actually promoted his horse to consul has become "a byword for the promotion of incompetents", especially in political life. It may have been one of Caligula's many oblique, malicious or darkly humorous insults, mostly directed at the senatorial class, but also against himself and his family. Winterling sees it as an insult to the consulars themselves. An aristocrat's highest ambition, the consulship, could be laid open to ruinous competition and at the same time, to ridicule. David Woods believes it unlikely that Caligula meant to insult the post of consul, as he had held it himself. Suetonius, possibly failing to get the joke, presents it as further proof of Caligula's insanity, adding circumstantial details more usually expected of the senatorial nobility, including palaces, servants and golden goblets, and invitations to banquets.

==== Bridge at Baiae ====
In 39 or 40, by Suetonius's reckoning, Caligula ordered a temporary floating bridge to be built using a double line of ships as pontoons, earth-paved and stretching for over two miles from the resort of Baiae, near Naples, to the neighbouring port of Puteoli, with resting places between. Some ships were built on site but grain ships were also requisitioned, brought to site, secured and temporarily resurfaced. Any practical purpose for the bridge is unclear; Winterling believes that it might have been intended to mark Caligula's attempted invasion of Britain. A two-day ceremonial was performed, with offerings to the sea-god Neptune and Invidia (Envy), and a satisfactory result, in that the sea remained completely calm. The bridge was said to rival the Persian king Xerxes's pontoon bridge across the Hellespont.

For the opening ceremony, Caligula donned the supposed breastplate of Alexander the Great, and rode his favourite horse, Incitatus, across the bridge, perhaps defying a prediction, attributed by Suetonius to Tiberius's soothsayer Thrasyllus of Mendes, that Caligula had "no more chance of becoming emperor than of riding a horse across the Bay of Baiae". On the second day, he rode the bridge from end to end several times "at full tilt", accompanied by the soldiery, famous nobles and hostages. Seneca and Dio claim that grain imports were dangerously depleted by Caligula's re-purposing of Rome's grain ships as pontoons. Barrett finds these accusations absurd; if the bridge was finished in 39, that was far too early to have had any effect on the annual grain supply, and "a genuine grain crisis was simply blamed on the most outlandish episode at hand." Dio places this episode soon after Caligula's furious denunciation of the Senate; Barrett speculates that Caligula may have intended the whole event as an object lesson on how completely he was in charge: it may also provide "the most striking example of his wasteful extravagance"; its pointlessness might have been the whole point.

=== Provinces ===
==== Judaea and Egypt ====
Caligula's reign saw an increase of tensions between Jews and ethnic Greeks. The two groups had settled throughout the Roman Empire and Judaea was ruled as a Roman client kingdom. They settled in Egypt following its conquest by Macedonian Greeks, and remained there after its conquest by Rome. While the Alexandrian Greeks held citizen status, Alexandrian Jews were classified as mere settlers, with no statutory or citizen rights other than those granted them by their Roman governors. The Greeks feared that official recognition of Jews as citizens would undermine their own status and privilege.

Caligula had replaced the prefect of Egypt, Aulus Avilius Flaccus, with Herod Agrippa, who was governor of Batanaea and Trachonitis, and was a personal friend. Flaccus had conspired against Caligula's mother and had connections with Egyptian separatists. In 38, Caligula sent Agrippa to Alexandria unannounced to check on Flaccus. According to Philo, the visit was met with jeers and mockery from the Greek population who saw Agrippa as a gimcrack "king of the Jews." In Philo's account, a mob of Greeks broke into synagogues to erect statues and shrines of Caligula, against Jewish religious law. Flaccus responded by declaring the Jews "foreigners and aliens", and expelled them from all but one of Alexandria's five districts, where they lived under dreadful conditions. Philo gives an account of various atrocities inflicted on Alexandria's Jews within and around this ghetto by the city's Greek population. Caligula held Flaccus responsible for the disturbances, exiled him, and eventually executed him.

In 39, Agrippa accused his uncle Herod Antipas, the tetrarch of Galilee and Perea, of planning a rebellion against Roman rule with the help of Parthia. Herod Antipas confessed, Caligula exiled him, and Agrippa was rewarded with his territories. Riots again erupted in Alexandria in 40 between Jews and Greeks, when Jews who refused to venerate the emperor as a god were accused of dishonouring him. In the Judaean city of Jamnia, resident Greeks built a shoddy, sub-standard altar to the Imperial cult, intending to provoke a reaction from the Jews; they immediately tore it down. This was interpreted as an act of rebellion. In response, Caligula ordered the erection of a statue of himself in the Jewish Temple of Jerusalem, a political, rather than a religious act for Rome, but a blasphemy for the Jews, and in conflict with Jewish monotheism. In this context, Philo wrote that Caligula "regarded the Jews with most especial suspicion, as if they were the only persons who cherished wishes opposed to his".

In May of 40, Philo accompanied a deputation of Alexandrian Jews and Greeks to Caligula, and a second deputation after 31 August that year, during the worst of the Alexandrian riots. Neither of these encounters proved decisive. Both gave Caligula ample opportunity for casual, friendly banter, which seems to have included humiliating levity, always at the Jewish delegation's expense; but he made no claims of divinity, either in his dress nor his speech, merely asking at the second encounter, more or less rhetorically, why Jews found his veneration so difficult. Philo and Josephus each saw Caligula's behaviour as driven by his claims to divinity, which for a Jew would have virtually defined him as fundamentally insane, despite appearances otherwise.

The ethnically Greek population of Alexandria had already made their loyalty to the new emperor clear, with displays of his image as focus for his cult. The destruction of the altar at Jamlia and, presumably, removal of "idolatrous" images placed in synagogues by Greek citizens, might have been intended as an expression of Jewish religious fervour, rather than a response aimed at one tyrant's offensive claims of personal godhood. Philo seems to have loathed Caligula from the start, but his belief that Caligula hated the Jews and was preparing their destruction has no basis in evidence. To place Caligula's statue in Temple precincts, showing him dressed as Jupiter, would have been consistent with the Empire-wide religious phenomenon known as Imperial cult, from whose full expression Jews had so far been exempted; they could offer prayer for the emperor, rather than to him; far from a perfect compromise but the highest honour that Jewish tradition permitted in honour of a mortal. Caligula found this most unsatisfactory, and demanded that his statue be installed in the Temple of Jerusalem forthwith.

The Governor of Syria, Publius Petronius, ordered a statue from Sidon, then postponed its installation for as long he could, rather than risk a serious Jewish rebellion. In some versions, Caligula proved amenable to rational discussion with Agrippa and Jewish authorities, and faced with threats of rebellion, destruction of property and loss of the grain-harvest if the plan went ahead, abandoned the project. In more hostile versions Caligula, being demonstrably insane, and incapable of rational discussion, impulsively changed his mind once again, and reissued the order to Petronius along with the threat of enforced suicide if he failed. An even larger statue of Caligula-Zeus was ordered from Rome; the ship carrying it was still under way when news of Caligula's death reached Petronius. Caligula's plan was abandoned, Petronius survived and the statue was never installed.

Philo reports a rumour that in 40, Caligula announced to the Senate that he planned to move to Alexandria, and rule the Empire from there as a divine monarch, a Roman pharaoh. Very similar rumours attended Julius Caesar's last days, up to his assassination and very much to his discredit. Caligula's ancestor Mark Antony took refuge in Egypt with Cleopatra, and Augustus had made it a so-called "Imperial province", under his direct control. It was the main source of Italy's grain supply, and was administered by members of the equestrian order, directly responsible to the ruling emperor. Egypt was, more or less, Caligula's property, to dispose of as he wished. Roman knowledge of pharaonic brother-sister marriages to maintain the royal bloodline would have shored up the many flimsy, scandalised allegations of adolescent incest between Caligula and Drusilla, supposedly discovered by Antonia but reported as rumour, and only by Suetonius. Barrett finds no further evidence for these allegations, and advises a skeptical attitude.

==== Germany and the Rhine frontier ====
In late 39 or early 40, Caligula ordered the concentration of military forces and supplies in upper Germany, and made his way there with a baggage train that supposedly included actors, gladiators, women, and a detachment of Praetorians. He might have meant to follow the paths of his father and grandfather, and attack the Germanic tribes along the upper Rhine; but according to ancient historians he was ill-prepared, and retreated in a panic. Modern historians, however, suppose that he had a valid political reason for his Germanic operation, and might even have been successful with that. But the exact locations and enemies of his campaign cannot be determined; possibilities include the Chatti in and around modern-day Hesse or the Suebi east of the Upper Rhine.

The ancient sources report that Caligula used the opportunity of his operations in Germany to seize the wealth of rich allies whom he conveniently suspected of treason, "putting some to death on the grounds that they were 'plotting' or 'rebelling'". Caligula accused the Imperial legate, Gaetulicus, of "nefarious plots", and had him executed – according to Dio, he was killed for being popular with his troops. Lepidus, along with Caligula's two sisters, Agrippina and Livilla, was accused of being part of this conspiracy; he too was executed and Caligula's two sisters were exiled after being condemned pro forma for adultery.

A senatorial embassy arrived from Rome, headed by Caligula's uncle Claudius, to congratulate the emperor for suppressing this latest conspiracy. It met with a hostile reception, in which Claudius was supposedly dunked in the Rhine (though this might have been the loser's award in a contest of Latin and Greek oratory held by Caligula in Gaul that winter). On Caligula's return from the north, he abandoned the theatre seating plans that Augustus had introduced so that rank alone would determine one's place. In the consequent free-for-all, seating was left to chance; doubtless to Caligula's pleasure, fights broke out as senators competed with common citizens for the best seats. Very late in his reign, possibly in its last few days, Caligula sent a communique in preparation for his imminent ovation in Rome, following his military activities in the North and his suppression of Lepidus. He announced that he would only be returning "to those who wanted him back"; to the "Equestrians and the People"; he did not mention the Senate or senators, of whom he had grown increasingly mistrustful.

==== Auctions ====
In late 39, Caligula wintered at Lugdunum (modern Lyon) in Gaul, where he auctioned off his sisters' portable property, including their jewellery, slaves and freedmen. Dio claims that wealthy bidders at these auctions were willing to offer far more than items were worth; some to show their loyalty, and others to rid themselves of some of the wealth that could render their execution worthwhile. Caligula is said to have used intimidation and various auctioneer's tricks and tactics to boost prices. In an event that Suetonius describes as "well known", a Praetorian gentleman, nodding off to sleep after a gladiator match, woke to find that he had bought 13 gladiators for the vastly over-inflated sum of 9 million sesterces. Caligula's first Lugdunum auction proved such a successful fundraiser that he had many of the furnishings of his palace in Rome carted to Lugdunum and auctioned off; they included many precious family heirlooms. Caligula recited their provenance during the auction, in an attempt to help ensure a fair return on objects intrinsically valuable, and seemingly much sought after by the wealthy for their Imperial associations.

Income from this second auction was relatively moderate. Kleijwegt (1996) describes Caligula's performance as vendor and auctioneer at this second auction as "completely out of character with the image of a tyrant". Auctions of Imperial property were acceptable ways to "balance the books", practiced by Augustus and later, by Trajan; they were expected to benefit the bidders as well as the vendor; Roman auctioneers were held in very low esteem, but Kleijwegt claims that Caligula seems to have behaved more like a benevolent princeps in this second auction, without malice, greed or intimidation.

==== Britannia ====
In the spring of 40, Caligula tried to extend Roman rule into Britannia. Two legions had been raised for this purpose, both likely named Primigeniae in honour of Caligula's newborn daughter. Ancient sources depict Caligula as being too cowardly to have attacked or as mad, but stories of his threatening a decimation of his troops indicate mutinies. Broadly, "it is impossible to judge why the army never embarked" on the invasion. Beyond mutinies, it may have simply been that British chieftains acceded to Rome's demands, removing any justification for war. Alternatively, it could have been merely a training and scouting mission or a short expedition to accept the surrender of the British chieftain Adminius. Suetonius reports that Caligula ordered his men to collect seashells as "spoils of the sea"; this may also be a mistranslation of musculi, meaning siege engines. The conquest of Britannia was later achieved during the reign of Caligula's successor, Claudius.

==== Mauretania ====
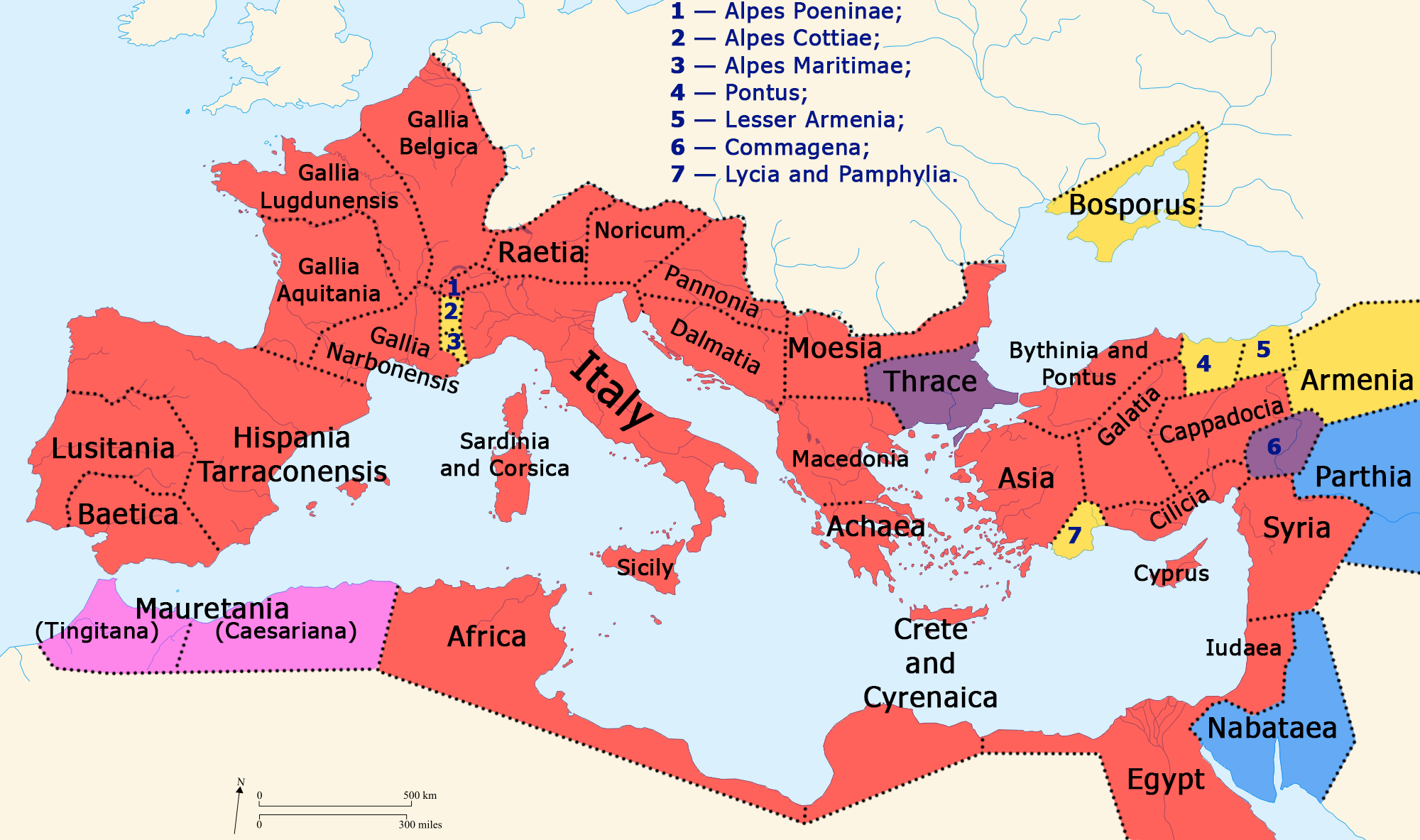
Map of the Roman Empire and neighboring states during the reign of Gaius Caligula (AD 37–41) Italy and Roman provinces Independent countries Client states (Roman puppets) Mauretania seized by Caligula Former Roman provinces Thrace and Commagena made client states by Caligula

In 40, Caligula annexed Mauretania, a wealthy, strategically significant client kingdom of Rome, inhabited by fiercely independent semi-nomads who resisted Romanisation. Its ruler, Ptolemy of Mauretania, was a noble descendant of Juba II, popular, extremely wealthy and with a reputation as "feckless and incompetent". Ptolemy failed to deal effectively with an uprising and was removed. The usual fate of incompetent client kings was retirement and a comfortable exile, but Caligula ordered Ptolemy to Rome and had him executed, some time after the spring of 40. His removal proved unpopular enough in Mauretania to provoke an uprising.

Rome divided Mauretania into two provinces, Mauretania Tingitana and Mauretania Caesariensis, separated by the river Malua. Pliny claims that division was the work of Caligula, but Dio states that the uprising was subdued in 42 (after Caligula's death), by Gaius Suetonius Paulinus and Gnaeus Hosidius Geta, and the division only took place after this. This confusion might mean that Caligula decided to divide the province, but postponed the division because of the rebellion. The first known equestrian governor of the joint provinces was Marcus Fadius Celer Flavianus, in office in 44.

Details on the Mauretanian events of 39–44 are lost, including an entire chapter by Dio on the annexation. Dio and Tacitus suggest that Caligula may have been motivated by fear, envy, and consideration of his own ignominious military performance in the north, rather than pressing military or economic needs. The rebellion of Tacfarinas had shown how exposed Africa Proconsularis was to its west and how the Mauretanian client kings were unable to provide protection to the province, and it is thus possible that Caligula's expansion was a prudent and ultimately successful response to potential future threats.

=== Religion ===
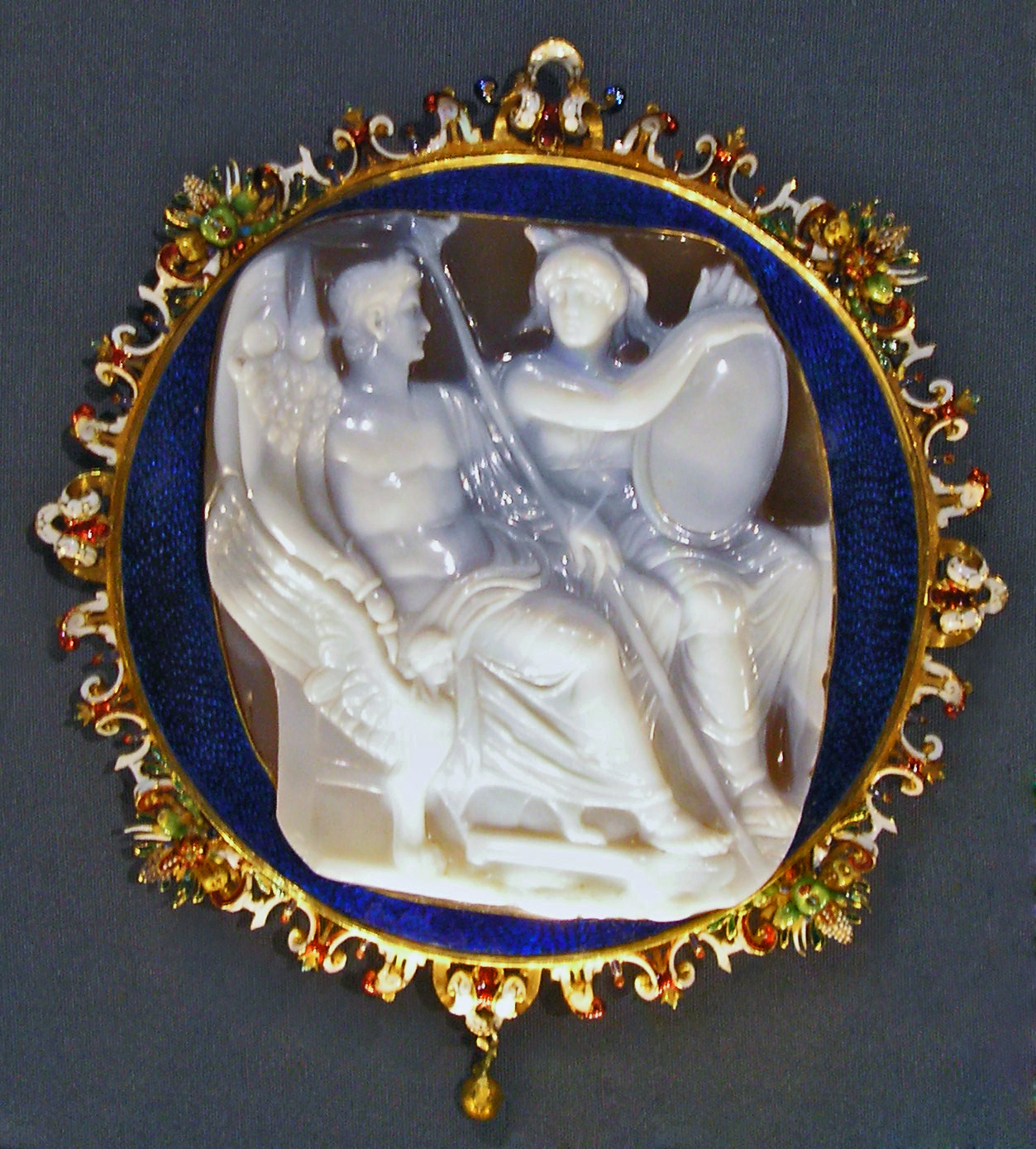
Cameo depicting Caligula and Roma, a personification of Rome

According to Barrett, "[o]f all the manifestations of wild and extravagant behaviour exhibited by Caligula during his brief reign, nothing has better served to confirm the popular notion of his insanity than his apparent demand to be recognised as a god."

Philo, Caligula's contemporary, claims that Caligula costumed himself as various heroes and deities, starting with demigods such as Dionysos, Herakles and the Dioscuri, and working up to major deities such as Mercury, Venus and Apollo. Philo describes these impersonations in a context of private pantomime or theatrical performances he may have witnessed or heard of during his diplomatic visit, as evidence that Caligula wanted to be venerated as a living god. Philo, as a Jew and a monotheist, took this as proof of the emperor's insanity.

Caligula's impersonations had a precedent; Augustus had once thrown a party in which he and his guests dressed up as the Olympian gods; Augustus was made up and dressed as Apollo. No-one was thought insane in consequence, and none claimed to be the god they impersonated; but the event was not repeated. It showed near-blasphemous disrespect to the gods in question, and insensitivity to the population at large – the feast was staged during a famine. Coin issues of the official Roman mint, dated to the early 20s BC, show Octavian as Apollo, Jupiter and Neptune. This too may have been thought a transgression, and was not repeated. Caligula took his own impersonations less seriously than some, certainly less seriously than Philo did. According to Dio, when a Gallic shoemaker laughed to see Caligula dressed as Jupiter, pronouncing oracles at the crowd from a lofty place, Caligula asked "and who do you think I am?" The shoemaker answered "a complete idiot". Caligula seems to have appreciated his straightforward honesty.

Dio claims that Caligula impersonated Jupiter to seduce various women; that he sometimes referred to himself as a divinity in public meetings; and that he was sometimes referred to as "Jupiter" in public documents. Caligula's special interest in Jupiter as Rome's chief deity is confirmed by all surviving sources. Simpson believes that Caligula may have considered Jupiter an equal, perhaps a rival.

According to Ittai Gradel, Caligula's performances as various deities prove no more than a penchant for theatrical fancy-dress and a mischievous desire to shock; as emperor, Caligula was also pontifex maximus, one of Rome's most powerful and influential state priests. The promotion of mortal rulers to godlike status, to honour their superior standing and perceived merits, was a commonplace phenomenon among Rome's eastern allies and client states; during their eastern tour, Germanicus, Agrippina and their children, including Caligula, were officially received as living deities by several cities of the Greek East. In Roman culture a client could flatter their living patron as "Jupiter on Earth", without reprimand. The divi (deceased members of the Imperial family promoted to divine status) were creations of the Senate, who voted them into official existence, appointed their priesthood and granted them cult at state expense. Cicero could protest at the implications of Caesar's divine honours while living but address Publius Lentulus as parens ac deus (parent and god) to thank him for his help, as aedile, against the conspirator Catiline. Daily reverence was offered as a matter of course to patrons, heads of household and the powerful by their clients, families and social inferiors. In 30 BC, libation-offerings to the genius of Octavian (later Augustus) became a duty at public and private banquets, and from 12 BC, state oaths were sworn by the genius of Augustus as the living emperor. Notwithstanding Dio's claims that cult to living emperors was forbidden in Rome itself, there is abundant evidence of municipal cult to Augustus in his lifetime, in Italy and elsewhere, locally organised and financed. As Gradel observes, no Roman was ever prosecuted for sacrificing to his emperor.

Caligula seems to have taken his religious duties very seriously. He found a replacement for the aged priest of Diana at Lake Nemi, reorganised the Salii (priests of Mars), and pedantically insisted that as it was nefas (religiously improper) for Jupiter's leading priest, the Flamen Dialis, to swear any oath, he could not swear the imperial oath of loyalty. (Note: Jupiter was the highest divine witness to oaths. The Flamen Dialis was sworn to his service, and was hedged about with an exhaustive range of prohibitions.) Caligula wished to take over or share the half-finished but splendid Temple of Apollo in Greek Didyma for his own cult. Seemingly, his statue was prepared, but possibly not installed. When Pausanias visited the still-unfinished temple a century later, its cult statue was of Apollo.

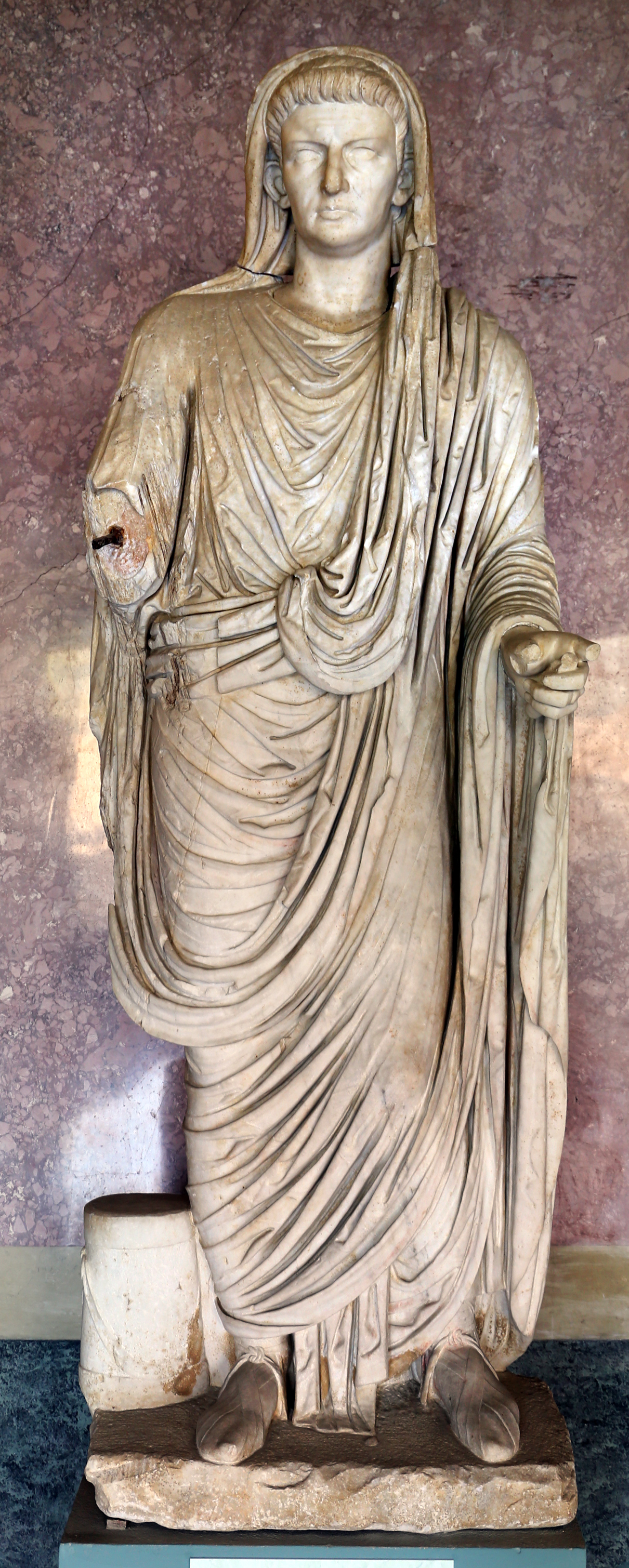
Contemporary statue portraying Caligula in his capacity as pontifex maximus

Suetonius and Dio mention a temple to Caligula in the city of Rome. Most modern scholarship agrees that if such a temple existed, it was probably on the Palatine. Augustus had already linked the Temple of Castor and Pollux directly to his imperial residence on the Palatine, and established an official priesthood of lesser magistrates, the seviri Augustales, usually drawn from his own freedmen to serve the genius Augusti (his "family spirit") and Lares (the twin ancestral spirits of his household). Dio claims that Caligula stationed himself to receive veneration, dressed as Jupiter Latiaris, between the images of Castor and Pollux, the twin Dioscuri, to whom he referred – humorously – as his doorkeepers. Dio's claim that two temples were built for Caligula in Rome, is unconfirmed. Simpson believes it likely that Caligula, voted a temple on the Palatine by the Senate, funded it himself.

An embassy from Greek states to Rome greeted Caligula as the "new god Augustus". In the Greek city of Cyzicus, a public inscription from the beginning of Caligula's reign gives thanks to him as a "New Sun-god". Egyptian provincial coinage and some state dupondii show Caligula enthroned; the first reigning Roman princeps to be described as the "New Sun", (Neos Helios) with the radiate crown of the Sun-god, or of Caligula's divine antecedent, the divus Augustus. Caligula's image on other state coinage carries no such "trappings of divinity". Compared to the full-blown cults to major deities of state, genius cults were quite modest in scope. Augustus, once deceased, was officially worshipped as a divus – immortal, but somewhat less than a full-blown deity; Tiberius, his successor, forbade his own personal cult outright in Rome itself, probably in consideration of Julius Caesar's assassination following his hubristic promotion as a living divinity. Augustus, and after him, Tiberius, insisted that if temples to honour them in the provinces were proposed by the local elite, they must be shared by the "genius of the Senate", or the personification of the Roman people, or the genius of Rome itself.

Dio claims that Caligula sold priesthoods for his unofficial genius cult to the wealthiest nobles, for a per capita fee of 10 million sesterces, and made loans available to those who could not afford immediate full payment. His priests supposedly included his wife, Caesonia, and his uncle Claudius, whom Dio claims was bankrupted by the cost. The circumstances mark this out as private cult and personal humiliation among the wealthy elite, not subsidised by the Roman state. Throughout his reign, Caligula seems to have remained popular with the masses, in Rome and the empire. There is no sound evidence that he caused the removal, replacement or imposition of Roman or other deities, or even that he threatened to do so, outside the hostile anecdotes of his biographers. Barrett (2015) asserts that the "emphatic and unequivocal message of the material evidence is that Caligula had no desire for the world to identify him as a god, even if, like most people, he enjoyed being treated like one." He did not demand worship as a living god; but he permitted it when it was offered; Imperial etiquette, and the examples of Augustus and Tiberius, would have him refuse divine honours but thank those who offered them, inferring their status as equal to his. He seems to have taken his own genius cult very seriously but his fatal offense was to willfully "insult or offend everyone who mattered", including the military officers who assassinated him.

== Assassination and aftermath ==
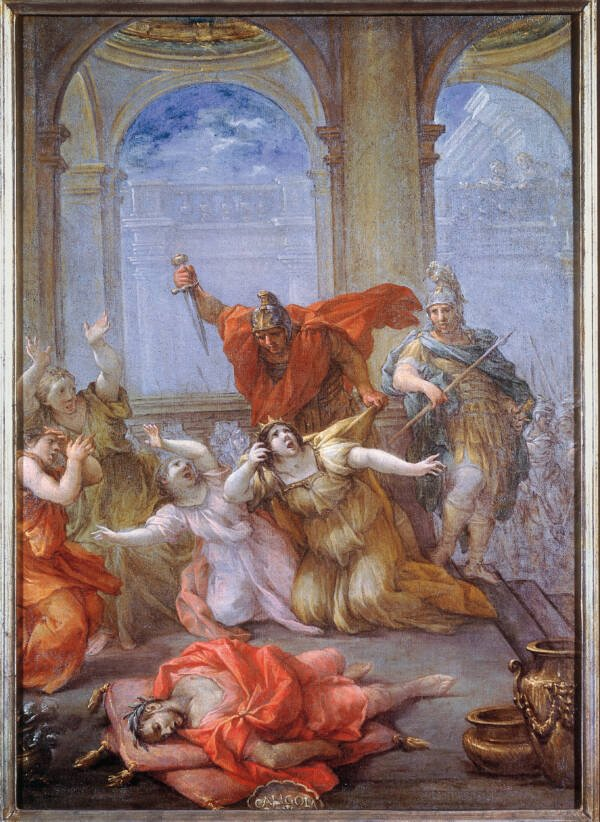
The Assassination of the Emperor Caligula, by Lazzaro Baldi, between 1624 and 1703

On 24 January 41, the day before his due departure for Alexandria, Caligula was assassinated by the Praetorian tribunes Cassius Chaerea and Cornelius Sabinus, and a number of centurions. Josephus names many of Caligula's inner circle as conspirators, and Dio seems to have had access to a senatorial version which purported to name many others. More likely, very few conspirators would have been involved, and not all need have been directly in touch with each other. Previous attempts had foundered or faded out when faced with the rewards and risks of betrayal by colleagues, whether through torture, fear of torture or promised reward. The Senate was a disunited body of self-interested, wealthy and mistrustful aristocrats, unwilling to risk their own prospects, and determined to present a virtuous, united front. In Josephus' account of Caligula's assassination, Chaerea was a "noble idealist", deeply committed to "Republican liberties"; he was also motivated by resentment of Caligula's routine personal insults and mockery. Suetonius and all other sources confirm that Caligula had insulted Chaerea, giving him watchwords like the ribald "Priapus" or "Venus", the latter said to refer to Chaerea's weak, high voice, and either his soft-hearted attitude when collecting taxes, or his duty to collect the tax on prostitutes. He was also known to do Caligula's "dirty work" for him, including torture.

Chaerea, Sabinus and others accosted Caligula as he addressed an acting troupe of young men beneath the palace during a series of games and dramatics being held for the Divus Augustus. The source details vary, but all agree that Chaerea was first to stab Caligula. The narrow space available offered little room for escape or rescue, and by the time Caligula's loyal Germanic guard could come to his defence, their Emperor was already dead. They killed several of Caligula's party, including some innocent senators and bystanders. The killing only stopped when the Praetorians took control. (Note: The cryptoporticus (underground corridor) beneath the imperial palaces on the Palatine Hill where this event took place was discovered by archaeologists in 2008.)

Josephus reports that the Senate tried to use Caligula's death as an opportunity to restore the Republic. This would have meant the abolition of the office of emperor, the end of dynastic rule, and restoration of the former social stature and privilege of nobles and senators. At least one senator, Lucius Annius Vinicianus, seems to have thought it an opportunity for a takeover. Some modern scholars believe he was the conspiracy's main instigator. Most ordinary citizens were taken aback by Caligula's murder, and found no cause to celebrate in losing the benefits of his rule. Almost all the named conspirators were from the elite. When Caligula's death was confirmed, the nobles and senators who had prospered through hypocrisy and sycophancy during his reign dared to claim prior knowledge of the plot, and share the credit for its success with their peers. Others sought to distance themselves from anything to do with it.

The assassins, fearing continued support for Caligula's family and allies, sought out and murdered Caligula's wife, Caesonia, and their young daughter Julia Drusilla, but were unable to reach Caligula's uncle, Claudius. In the traditional account, a soldier, Gratus, found Claudius hiding behind a palace curtain. A sympathetic faction of the Praetorian Guard smuggled him out to their nearby camp, and nominated him as emperor. The Senate, faced with what now seemed inevitable, confirmed their choice. Caligula's "most powerful and universally feared adviser", the freedman Callistus, may have engineered this succession, having discreetly shifted his loyalty from Caligula to Claudius while Caligula lived.

The killing of Caligula had been extralegal, tantamount to regicide, and those who carried it out had broken their oaths of loyalty to him. Claudius, as a prospective replacement for Caligula, could acknowledge his predecessor's failings but could not be seen to condone his murder, or find fault with the principate as an institution. Caligula had been popular with a clear majority of Rome's lesser citizenry, and the Senate could not afford to ignore the fact. Claudius appointed a new Praetorian prefect, and executed Chaerea, a tribune named Lupus, and the centurions involved. He allowed Sabinus to commit suicide.

Claudius refused the Senate's requests to formally declare Caligula hostis (a public enemy), or condemn his memory (see damnatio memoriae). He also turned down a proposal to officially condemn all the Caesars and destroy their temples. Caligula's name was removed from the official lists of oaths and dedications; some inscriptions were removed or obliterated; most of his statues had the heads recut, to resemble Augustus, or Claudius, or in one case, Nero, who would suffer a similar fate.

According to Suetonius, Caligula's body was placed under turf until it was burned and entombed by his sisters.

== Personal life ==
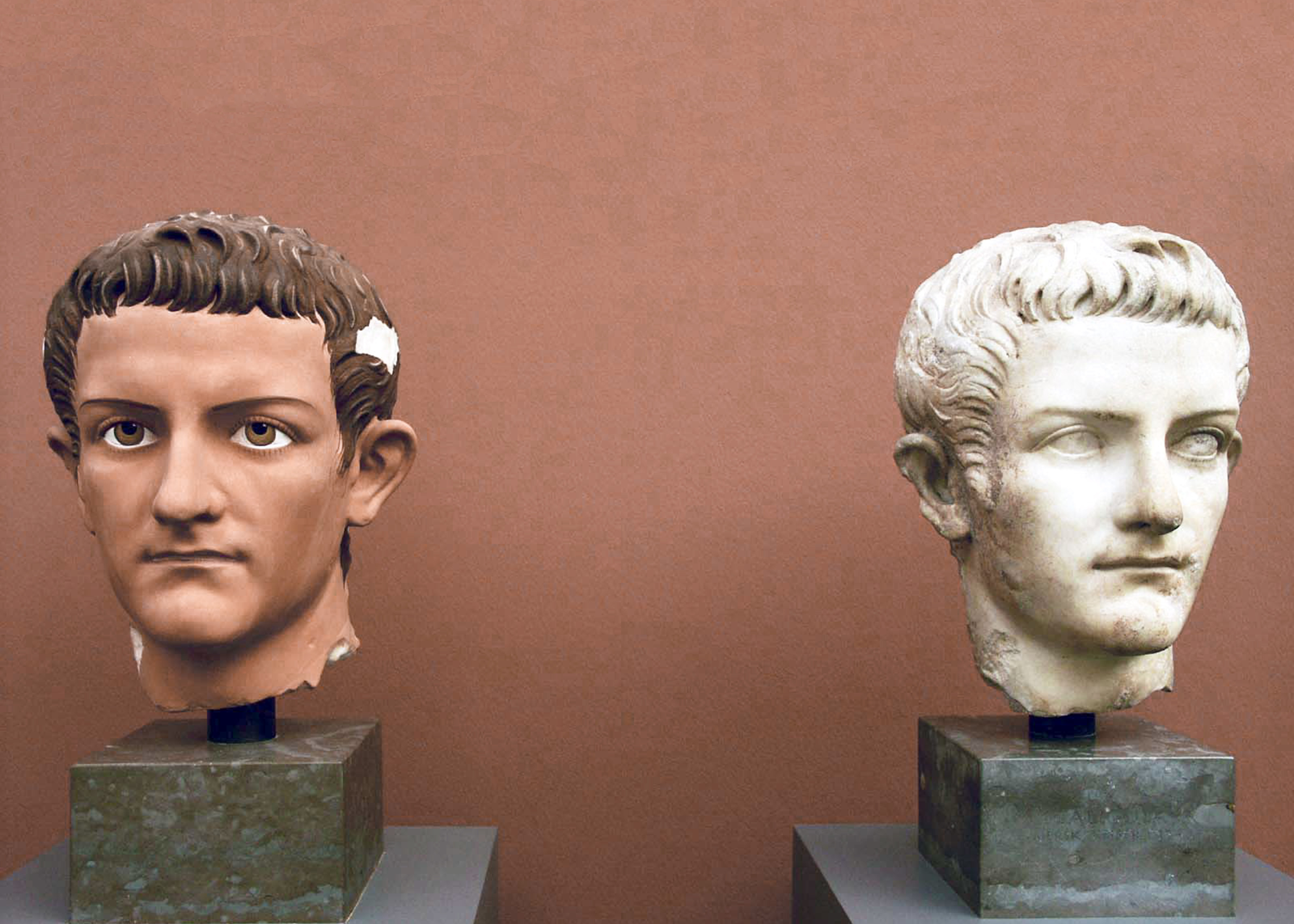
Marble bust of Caligula with traces of original paint beside a plaster replica trying to recreate the polychrome traditions of ancient sculpture

Caligula's childhood health may have been delicate; Augustus appointed two physicians to accompany his journey north to join his parents, in AD 14; Suetonius connects this to possible childhood bouts of epilepsy. As an adult, he was subject to fainting fits. He was a habitually light sleeper, prone to nodding off during banquets, sleeping no more than 3 hours in any one night, and subject to vivid nightmares. Barrett describes him as "nervous and highly strung". When speaking in public, he would fidget and move about, overcome by the flood of his own words and ideas; despite that, he was an eloquent speaker. He grew stronger with age, but was probably never robust or athletic, despite his practise as a charioteer. Little is known of his illness in 38, nor what it changed, if anything, but it was a serious, possibly life-threatening event. Philo blames it on Caligula's habitual over-indulgence in rich foods and wine, general intemperance and a stress-induced nervous breakdown. Philo believed that the illness removed Caligula's pretence of decency, and revealed his inner cruelty and ruthlessness, evident in the murders of his own father-in-law, Silanus, and young cousin Gemellus.

The sources are somewhat contradictory on the matter of Caligula's sex life. Seneca claims that during a public banquet he humiliated senator Decimus Valerius Asiaticus, his "especial friend", with a loud first-hand account of Valerius' wife's disappointing performance in bed. Caligula is said to have had "enormous" sexual appetites, several mistresses and male lovers, but in relation to the alleged "perversions" practised at Capri by Tiberius and, in some sources, shared by Caligula, Barrett finds him remarkably prudish in expelling the so-called spintriae from the island on his accession. (Note: In a gloss of Suetonius' Life of Tiberius, "spintria" is a small brass or bronze token, apparently used here by Suetonius as synonymous with "male prostitute")

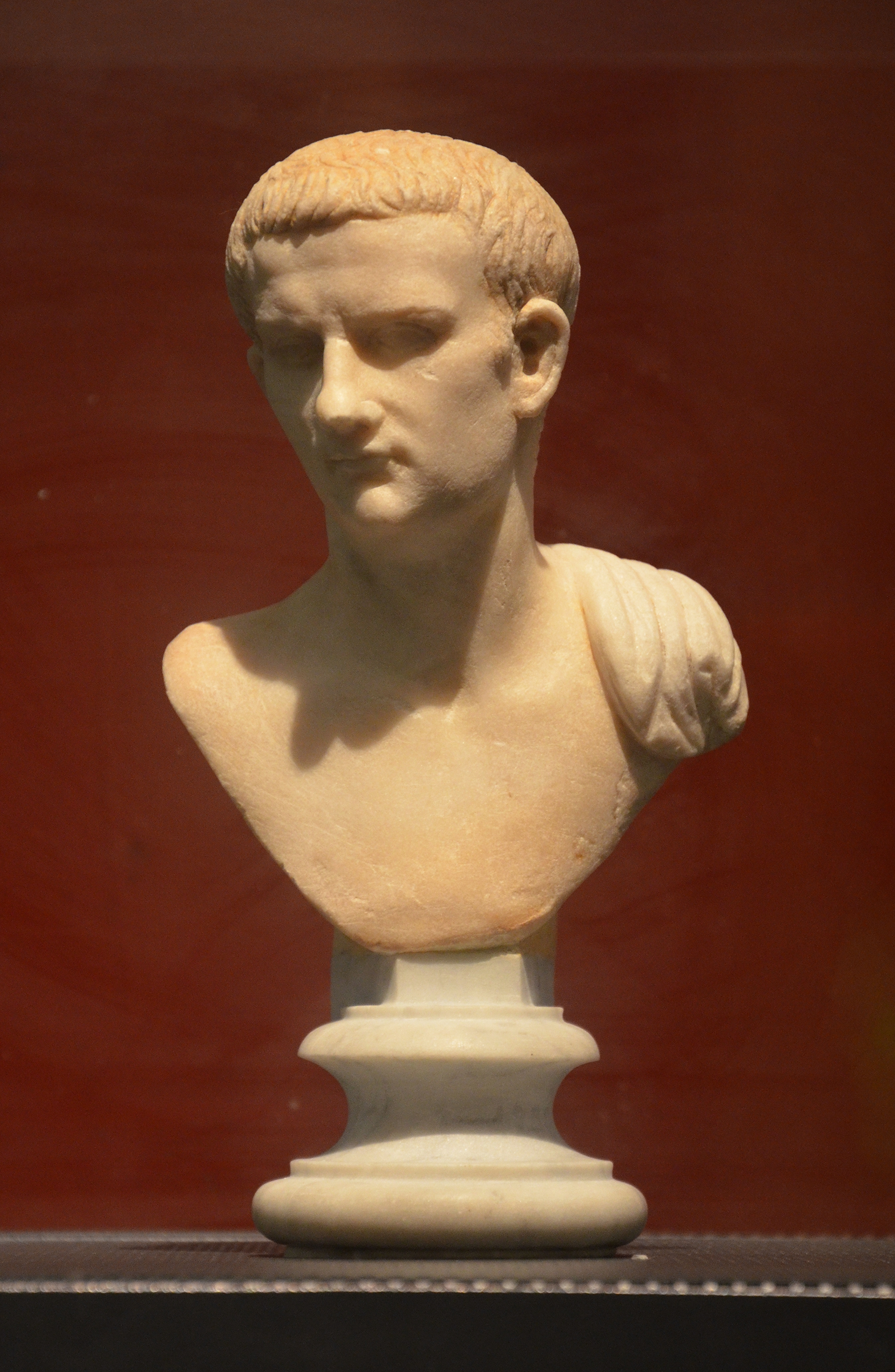
So-called "little bust" of Caligula, found in the River Tiber in Rome

Caligula's first wife was Junia Claudia, daughter of ex-consul Marcus Junius Silanus. Like most marriages in Rome's upper echelons and, perhaps, all but one of Caligula's four marriages, this was a political alliance, intended to produce a legitimate heir and further Caligula's dynasty. Junia and her baby died in childbirth, less than a year later. Soon after, Macro seems to have persuaded his own wife, Ennia Thrasylla, to take up a sexual affair with Caligula, perhaps to help him through the loss. Suetonius and Dio claim that Caligula met Livia Orestilla at her marriage to Gaius Calpurnius Piso, and abducted her so that he could marry her instead and father a legitimate heir. When she proved faithful to her former husband, Caligula banished her. The Arval Brethren's records confirm her marriage to Piso, but under ordinary Roman custom. Susan Wood dismisses Caligula's "marriage" to her as a drunken party stunt. Caligula's marriage to the "beautiful... very wealthy" and extravagant Lollia Paulina was quickly followed by divorce, on the grounds of her infertility. His fourth and last marriage, to Caesonia, seems to have been a love-match, in which he was both "uxorious and monogamous", and fathered a daughter whom he named Julia Drusilla, in commemoration of his late sister. Caligula's contemporaries could not understand his attraction to Caesonia; she had proved herself fertile in previous marriages but also had a reputation for "high living and low morals", very far from the model of an aristocratic Roman wife. Tales reported by Josephus, Suetonius and the satirist Juvenal regarding Caligula's sexual dynamism are inconsistent with rumours that Caesonia had to arouse his interest with a love potion, which turned his mind and brought on his "madness". Barrett suggests that this rumour might have had no foundation other than Caligula's quip that "he felt like torturing Caesonia to discover why he loved her so passionately.

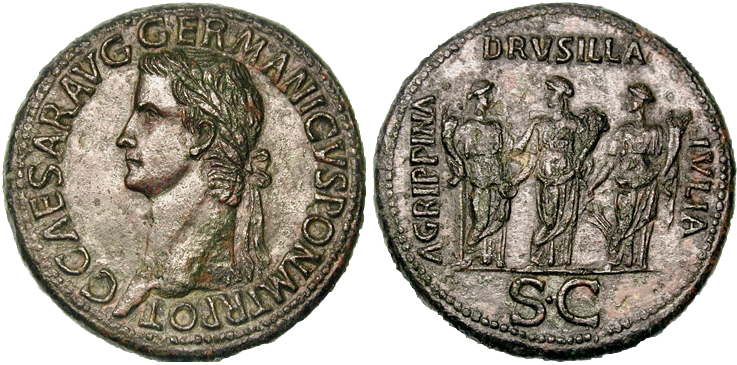
Roman sesterce depicting Caligula, AD 38. The reverse shows Caligula's three sisters, Agrippina, Drusilla and Livilla. Caption: C. CAESAR AVG. GERMANICVS PON. M. TR. POT. / AGRIPPINA DRVSILLA IVLIA S. C.

Allegations of incest between Caligula and his sisters, or just him and his favourite, Drusilla, go back no further than Suetonius, who admits that in his own time, they were hearsay. Seneca and Philo, moralising contemporaries of Caligula, do not mention these stories even after Caligula's death, when it would have been safe to do so. Caligula's devotion to his youngest sister was evident but then as now, allegations of incest fit the amoral, "mad Emperor" stereotype, promiscuous with money, sex and the lives of his subjects. Dio repeats, as fact, the rumour that Caligula also had "improper relations" with his two older sisters, Agrippina and Livilla.

== Mental condition ==
There is no reliable evidence of Caligula's mental state at any time in his life. Had he been thought truly insane, his misdeeds would not have been thought his fault: Winterling points out that in Roman law, the insane were not legally responsible for their actions, no matter how extreme. Responsibility for their control and restraint fell on those around them. In the course of their narratives, all the primary and contemporary sources give reasons to discredit and ultimately condemn Caligula, for offences against proprieties of class, religion or his role as emperor. "Thus, his acts should be seen from other angles, and the search for 'mad Caligula' abandoned." Barrett suggests that from a very early age, with the loss of his father, then of his mother and what remained of his family, Caligula was preoccupied with his own survival. Given near limitless powers to use as he saw fit, he used them to feed his sense of self-importance, "practically devoid of any sense of moral responsibility, a man for whom the tenure of the principate was little more than an opportunity to exercise power". Caligula "clearly had a highly developed sense of the absurd, resulting in a form of humour that was often cruel, sadistic and malicious, and which made its impact essentially by cleverly scoring points over those who were in no position to respond in kind."

Philo saw Caligula's illness of 37 as a form of nervous collapse, a response to the extreme stresses and strains of Imperial rule, for which Caligula was temperamentally ill-equipped. Philo, Josephus and Seneca see Caligula's apparent "insanity" as an underlying personality trait accentuated through self-indulgence and the unlimited exercise of power. Seneca acknowledges that Caligula's promotion to emperor seemed to make him more arrogant, angry and insulting. Several modern sources suggest underlying medical conditions as explanations for some aspects of his behaviour and appearance. They include mania, bipolar disorder, schizophrenia, encephalitis, meningitis, and epilepsy, the so-called "falling sickness". Benediktson refines Suetonius' statement that Caligula could not swim to a diagnosis of interictal temporal lobe epilepsy, and a consequent fear of seizures that prevented his learning to swim. In Romano-Greek medical theory, severe epilepsy attacks were associated with the full moon and the moon goddess Selene, with whom Caligula was claimed to converse and enjoy sexual congress. Suetonius' descriptions of Caligula as physically repulsive are neither reliable nor likely, considering his ecstatic and enthusiastic reception as a youthful princeps by the populace. In the ancient world, a person's physique was believed to be a reliable guide to their character and behaviour.

== Contemporary historiography ==
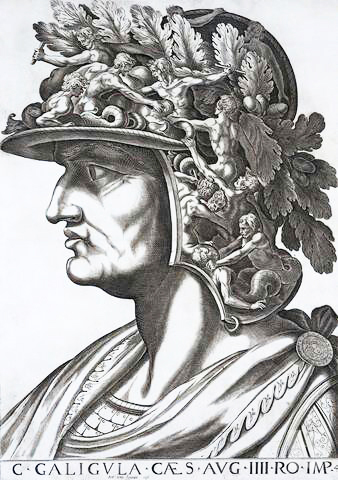
Fanciful Renaissance depiction of Caligula

Most facts and circumstances of Caligula's reign are lost to history. The two most important literary sources on Caligula and his reign are Suetonius, a government official of equestrian rank, born around 70 AD; and Cassius Dio, a Bithynian senator who held consulships in AD 205 and 229. Suetonius tends to arrange his material thematically, with little or no chronological framework, more biographer than historian. Dio provides a somewhat inconsistent chronology of Caligula's reign. He dedicates 13–21 chapters to positive features of Caligula's reign but nearly 40 to Caligula as "monster".

Philo's works On the Embassy to Gaius and Flaccus give some details on Caligula's early reign, but more on events involving Jews in Judea and Egypt, whose political and religious interests conflicted with those of the ethnically Greek, pro-Roman population. Philo saw Caligula as responsible for the suffering of the Jews, whom he invariably portrays in a morally positive light. Seneca's various works give mostly scattered anecdotes on Caligula's personality, probably written in the reign of Claudius, who had a vested interest in the portrayal of his predecessor as "cruel and despotic, even mad". Seneca was prone to "grovelling flattery" of whoever reigned at the time. His experience under Caligula "could have clouded his judgment". He narrowly avoided a death sentence in AD 39, probably imposed for his association with known conspirators. Caligula had a low opinion of his literary style.

Further contemporaneous histories of Caligula's reign are attested by Tacitus, who describes them as biased for or against Caligula; of Tacitus' own work, little of relevance to Caligula survives but Tacitus' works testify to his general hostility to the imperial system. Among the known losses of his works is a substantial portion of the Annals. Fabius Rusticus and Cluvius Rufus wrote histories, now lost, condemning Caligula. Tacitus describes Fabius Rusticus as a friend of Seneca, prone to embellishments and misrepresentations. Cluvius Rufus was a senator involved in Caligula's assassination; his original works are lost, but he was a competent historian, used as a primary source by Josephus, Tacitus, Suetonius and Plutarch.

Caligula's sister, Agrippina the Younger, wrote an autobiography that included a detailed account of Caligula's reign, but it too is lost. Agrippina was banished by Caligula for her connection to Marcus Lepidus, who conspired against him. Caligula also seized the inheritance of Agrippina's son, the future emperor Nero. Gaetulicus flattered Caligula in writings now lost. Suetonius wrote his biography of Caligula 80 years after his assassination, and Cassius Dio over 180 years after; the latter offers a loose chronology. Josephus gives a detailed account of Caligula's assassination and its aftermath, published around 93 AD, but it is thought to draw upon a "richly embroidered and historically imaginative" anonymous biography of Herod Agrippa, presented as a Jewish "national hero". Pliny the Elder's Natural History has a few brief references to Caligula, possibly based these on the accounts by his friend Suetonius, or an unnamed, shared source. Of the few surviving sources on Caligula, none paints Caligula in a favourable light. Little has survived on the first two years of his reign, and only limited details on later significant events, such as the annexation of Mauretania, Caligula's military actions in Britannia, and the basis of his feud with the Senate.

== Modern depictions ==
=== In film and series ===
- Welsh actor Emlyn Williams was cast as Caligula in the never-completed 1937 film I, Claudius.
- He was played by Ralph Bates in the 1968 ITV historical drama series, The Caesars.
- American actor Jay Robinson famously portrayed a sinister and scene-stealing Caligula in two epic films of the 1950s, The Robe (1953) and its sequel Demetrius and the Gladiators (1954).
- He was played by John Hurt in the 1976 BBC mini-series I, Claudius.
- In a 1969 television interview for the programme Incontri, Roberto Rossellini stated that he planned to make television films about Socrates and Caligula. Rossellini interpreted Caligula's apparently irrational behaviour as a deliberate attempt to destroy the public image of the Roman emperor. Unlike his Socrates project, however, the planned film on Caligula was never made.
- A feature-length historical film, Caligula, was completed in 1979 with Malcolm McDowell in the lead role.
- His reign is depicted across the second and third episodes of the miniseries A.D.: Anno Domini, which adapted the Acts of the Apostles in parallel with the history of the Caesars from Tiberus through Nero. He was portrayed by John McEnery. Many of Caligula's connections to the other plotlines are via the fictional brother and sister Caleb and Sarah. However, it is also notable that Cornelius the Centurion is depicted as the man in charge of overseeing the installation of the Emperor's statue in the Temple.
- He was portrayed by David Brandon in the 1982 historical exploitation film Caligula... The Untold Story.
- He was played by Alexis Arquette in two episodes of Xena: Warrior Princess.
- The 2004 film Imperium: Nero, while primarily about his nephew (later the Emperor Nero) features Caligula in the early part of the narrative ruling over an increasingly hostile Senate and banishing his sister Aggripina. John Simm portrays Caligula less as a raving lunatic and more as an impulsive and authoritarian figure whose actions are likelier to be interpreted as coming out of spite.
- Caligula is a character in the 2015 NBC series A.D. The Bible Continues, and is played by British actor Andrew Gower. His portrayal emphasises Caligula's "debauched and dangerous" persona as well as his sexual appetite, quick temper, and violent nature.
- The third season of the Roman Empire series (released on Netflix in 2019) is named Caligula: The Mad Emperor, with South African actor Ido Drent in the leading role.
- In the award-winning BBC show Horrible Histories he is portrayed by Simon Farnaby.

=== In literature and theatre ===
- Kajus Cezar Caligula, by Polish author Karol Hubert Rostworowski, is a play premiered in Juliusz Słowacki City Theater, Kraków, 31 March 1917. The title character is presented as a weak and unhappy man who became a victim of circumstances that brought him to power that surpassed him.
- Caligula, by French author Albert Camus, is a play in which Caligula returns after deserting the palace for three days and three nights following the death of his beloved sister, Drusilla. The young emperor then uses his unfettered power to "bring the impossible into the realm of the likely".
- In the 1934 novel I, Claudius by English writer Robert Graves, Caligula is presented as a murderous sociopath who became clinically insane early in his reign. In the novel, at the age of only ten, Caligula drove his father Germanicus to a state of despair and death by secretly terrorizing him. Graves' Caligula commits incest with all three of his sisters and is implied to have murdered Drusilla. The novel was adapted for television in the 1976 BBC mini-series of the same name.
- Incitatus, Caesar's favourite horse, is the subject of Polish poet Zbigniew Herbert's poem Kaligula (in Pan Cogito, 1974).

=== In music ===
- A young Caligula appears as one of the characters in Heinrich Ignaz Franz Biber's opera Arminio.
- Caligula is the main character in Detlev Glanert's opera Caligula, based on the Albert Camus play.
- Different composers from the Baroque era appear to have composed operatic works about Caligula, but most of these have been lost.
- In 2012, British synth-pop duo Pet Shop Boys released a song called Hell, which mentions various famous people who have made a name for themselves in history through acts of violence, including Caligula.
- Rock band Them Crooked Vultures released a song called Caligulove on their self titled album released in 2009

== See also ==
- List of Roman emperors

== Bibliography ==
=== Modern sources ===
- Alston, Richard (1998). Aspects of Roman history, AD 14–117. London: Routledge. ISBN 978-0-203-01187-4 – via Internet Archive.
- Barrett, Anthony A. (1989). Caligula: The Corruption of Power. London: Batsford. ISBN 978-0-7134-5487-1.
- Barrett, Anthony A. (2015). Caligula: The Abuse of Power (2nd ed.). London: Routledge. ISBN 978-1-315-72541-3.
- Barrett, Anthony A.; Yardley, John C. (2023). The Emperor Caligula in the Ancient Sources. Oxford: Oxford University Press. doi:10.1093/oso/9780198854562.001.0001. ISBN 978-0-19-885457-9.
- Beard, Mary; North, John A.; Price, S.R.F. (1998). Religions of Rome: a history. Vol. 1. Cambridge University Press. ISBN 978-0-521-30401-6.
- Becker, Armin (1992). Rom und die Chatten [Rome and the Chatti]. Darmstadt/Marburg: Historische Kommission für Hessen. ISBN 3-88443-177-3.
- Benediktson, D. Thomas (1991). "Caligula's phobias and philias: fear of seizure?". The Classical Journal. 87 (2): 159–163. ISSN 0009-8353. JSTOR 3297970.
- Bowman, Alan; Garnsey, Peter; Rathbone, Dominic, eds. (2008). The Cambridge Ancient History: The High Empire, AD 70–192. Vol. 11 (2 ed.). Cambridge University Press. doi:10.1017/CHOL9780521263351. ISBN 9781139054393.
- Gradel, Ittai (2002). Emperor Worship and Roman Religion. Oxford Classical Monographs. Oxford: Clarendon Press. ISBN 978-0-19-815275-0.
- Mattingly, Harold; Sydenham, Edward A.; Sutherland, C.H.V. (1923–1984). Roman Imperial Coinage, 31 BC to AD 69. Vol. 1. London: Spink & Son.
- Pollini, John (2012). From Republic to Empire. University of Oklahoma Press. ISBN 978-0-8061-8816-4.
- Riemer, Ulrike (2006). Die römische Germanienpolitik von Caesar bis Commodus [The Roman policy in Germania from Caesar to Commodus]. Darmstadt: Wissenschaftliche Buchgesellschaft. ISBN 3-534-17438-0.
- Salmon, Edward T (1987). A History of the Roman World from 30 BC to AD 138. London: Methuen. ISBN 0-416-10710-9 – via Internet Archive.
- Sidwell, Barbara (2010). "Gaius Caligula's mental illness". The Classical World. 103 (2): 183–206. doi:10.1353/clw.0.0165. ISSN 0009-8418. JSTOR 40599927. PMID 20213971.
- Simpson, C.J. (1981). "The Cult of the Emperor Gaius". Latomus. 40 (3): 489–511. ISSN 0023-8856. JSTOR 41532141.
- Wiedemann, T.E.J. (1996). "Tiberius to Nero". In Bowman, Alan K; et al. (eds.). The Augustan Empire, 43 BC–AD 69. Cambridge Ancient History. Vol. 10 (2nd ed.). Cambridge University Press. pp. 198–255. ISBN 0-521-26430-8.
- Wilkinson, Sam (2004). Caligula. Routledge. ISBN 978-1-134-24693-9.
- Winterling, Aloys (2011). Caligula: A Biography. University of California Press. ISBN 978-0-520-94314-8.
- Zimmermann, Markus (2018). "Caligula am Oberrhein. Ein altbekanntes Zeugnis des Eutrop im Lichte neuerer archäologischer und epigraphischer Forschungen" [Caligula on the Upper Rhine. A well-known testimony of Eutrop in the light of recent archaeological and epigraphic research]. Göttinger Forum für Altertumswissenschaft. 21: 101–115. doi:10.14628/GFA_021_2018_A05.

=== Ancient sources ===
- Philo (1855) [c. 38 AD]. Various works. Translated by Charles Duke Yonge. Loeb Classical Library.
  - On the Embassy to Gaius
  - Flaccus
  - On Firmness
  - On Anger
  - On Tranquility of Mind
  - On the Shortness of Life
- Lucius Annaeus Seneca the Younger (1932) [1st century]. Essays. Translated by Aubrey Stewart. Loeb Classical Library.
- Gaius Plinius Secundus (1961) [c. 77 AD]. Natural History. Translated by H. Rackham; W.H.S. Jones; D.E. Eichholz. Harvard University Press.
- Josephus (1737) [c. 96 AD]. "Chapters XVIII–XIX". Antiquities of the Jews. Translated by William Whiston. Harvard University Press.
- Publius Cornelius Tacitus (1924) [c. 110 AD]. The Annals. Translated by Frederick W. Shipley. Loeb Classical Library.
- Gaius Suetonius Tranquillus (1914) [c. 121 AD]. "Life of Augustus". The Twelve Caesars. Translated by John Carew Rolfe. Loeb Classical Library.
- Gaius Suetonius Tranquillus (1914) [c. 121 AD]. "Life of Tiberius". The Twelve Caesars. Translated by John Carew Rolfe. Loeb Classical Library.
- Gaius Suetonius Tranquillus (1914) [c. 121 AD]. "Life of Caligula". The Twelve Caesars. Translated by John Carew Rolfe. Loeb Classical Library.
- Gaius Suetonius Tranquillus (1914) [c. 121 AD]. "Life of Claudius". The Twelve Caesars. Translated by John Carew Rolfe. Loeb Classical Library.
- Lucius Cassius Dio (1927) [c. 230]. "Book 59". Roman History. Translated by Earnest Cary. Loeb Classical Library.

Caligula Julio-Claudian dynasty Born: 31 August AD 12 Died: 24 January AD 41
Preceded by Tiberius	Roman emperor 37–41	Succeeded by Claudius
Political offices
Preceded by Gn. Acerronius Proculus; G. Petronius Pontius Nigrinus	Roman consul July–August 37; With: Claudius	Succeeded by A. Caecina Paetus; G. Caninius Rebilus
Preceded by Ser. Asinius Celer; Sex. Nonius Quinctilianus	Roman consul January 39; With: L. Apronius Caesianus	Succeeded by Q. Sanquinius Maximus
Preceded by A. Didius Gallus; Gn. Domitius Afer	Roman consul January 40 sine collega	Succeeded by G. Laecanius Bassus; Q. Terentius Culleo
Preceded by G. Laecanius Bassus; Q. Terentius Culleo	Roman consul January 41; With: Gn. Sentius Saturninus	Succeeded by Q. Pomponius Secundus
