= Ituria gens =

Ancient Roman family

The gens Ituria was an obscure plebeian family at ancient Rome. Almost no members of this gens are mentioned by historians, but several are known from inscriptions.

== Members ==
- Publius Iturius Sabinus, a potter active during the middle part of the first century, whose wares were distributed in Venetia and Histria, and in Pannonia Inferior.
- Iturius, a client of Junia Silana, who induced him and another man, Calvisius, to accuse Agrippina of plotting against her son, the emperor Nero. Agrippina indignantly rebutted the charges, and Silana was sent into exile, along with her clients.
- Ituria Tigris, dedicated a tomb at Tergeste in Venetia and Histria to her son, Lucius Iturius Corinthus, one of the duumviri jure dicundo of that town, dating to the first quarter of the second century.
- Lucius Iturius Corinthus, duumvir jure dicundo at Tergeste, where he was buried in the first part of the second century, with a monument from his mother, Ituria Tigris.
- Ituria Nice, buried at Rome, aged thirty-one, with a monument from her patron, Lucius Iturius Zosimus.
- Lucius Iturius Zosimus, dedicated a tomb at Rome to his client, Ituria Nice.

== See also ==
- List of Roman gentes

== Bibliography ==
- Publius Cornelius Tacitus, Annales.
- Theodor Mommsen et alii, Corpus Inscriptionum Latinarum (The Body of Latin Inscriptions, abbreviated CIL), Berlin-Brandenburgische Akademie der Wissenschaften (1853–present).
- René Cagnat et alii, L'Année épigraphique (The Year in Epigraphy, abbreviated AE), Presses Universitaires de France (1888–present).
- Paul von Rohden, Elimar Klebs, & Hermann Dessau, Prosopographia Imperii Romani (The Prosopography of the Roman Empire, abbreviated PIR), Berlin (1898).
