= Juniyan (Junia) =

Coordinates: 34°23′33″N 73°03′33″E

Junia is located in the Abbottabad district of Khyber Pakhtunkhwa. The expansive valley of Junia spreads over 180,037 canals, which is the highest area occupied by any village in Tanawal. It is located at an average elevation of 849 meters. It is located on the north-west side of Abbottabad bordering Mansehra.

The village is almost entirely populated by Tanolis. The main tribes are: Tanoli (95%), Awan (2.7%), Sulmani (2.1%) and Turk (1%). It has a population of over 5,000 with a literacy rate of 99%. The village hosts 5 PhD's, 4 MBBS, 10 engineers, accountants as well as postgraduates. Chamhatti village is close to it as well as other villages near Junia:

Kotla (1.6 nm) Jhokan (1.8 nm) Kamila (1.0 nm) Chikar Bahian Kalan (1.3 nm) Thathi (1.3 nm) Barila Khurd (2.0 nm) Barila Kalan (2.0 nm) Kharper (0.8 nm) Numshera (1.0 nm) Naich (1.2 nm) Beri (1.7 nm) Khalabat (1.0 nm) Kangar Bala (1.3 nm) Kangar Pain (1.3 nm) Ahmedabad (1.3 nm) Kot (1.6 nm) Rattian (2.0 nm).
