= Junia Claudilla =

First wife of Roman Emperor Caligula

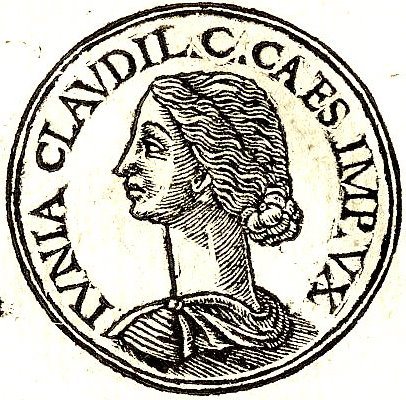
- Junia Claudilla from "Promptuarii Iconum Insigniorum"
- Born: ca. 18 AD
- Died: 37 AD; Capri
- Cause of death: complications from childbirth
- Other name: Junia Claudia
- Known for: first wife of emperor Caligula
- Spouse: Caligula
- Children: 1 (Note: If the child was a girl she would have been named Julia, if a boy the child would have likely been named after his father; Gaius Julius Caesar Germanicus. In accordance with Roman naming conventions.)
- Parent: Marcus Junius Silanus
- Family: Junii Silani

Junia Claudilla (c. 18 AD – d. 34/36/37 AD), also known as Junia Claudia, was the first wife of the Roman Emperor Caligula before he came to power.

== Biography ==
=== Early life ===
Her father was a distinguished senator named Marcus Junius Silanus, one of emperor Tiberius closest friends. She was the sister of Junia Silana who was a friend of Caligula's sister Julia Agrippina. Maxwell Craven has speculated that her mother may have been a Claudia and a relative of Tiberius. Ronald Syme agrees that Claudilla was likely related to Tiberius, but thinks the descent came from her father. She was likely also closely related to Appius Junius Silanus through the Claudii Pulchri.

=== Marriage ===
Claudilla was given in marriage to the young prince by his grand-uncle the Emperor Tiberius. Tiberius's reasons for arranging the match are unknown. In terms of succession it made no obvious sense as each of Caligula's brothers had been married off to a cousin within the Julio-Claudian family, adding extra prestige to the men, while Claudilla is not known to have had any such ancestry. (Note: Although the book A History of the Roman People claims she was a direct descendant of Octavia Minor and Marcus Antonius.) It seems that Tiberius did not consider the possibility of Caligula remarrying one of his brothers' widows. Tiberius may have picked her simply because there were no women of appropriate background for Caligula. It is also possible that Tiberius arranged the match because it would bring Caligula more under his control due to his new father-in-law being a firm supporter of Tiberius. Anthony Barrett on the other hand has argued that the marriage implied favour from Tiberius towards Caligula, since it was impressive compared to those of his sisters. They were married at Antium either in 31 before Sejanus fell from favour or in 33 when the last of Sejanus's supporters were ousted (if it was in 33 then it would likely have been between the second half of July and first half of August). Tiberius himself attended the ceremony, which would have been a rare appearance for him on the mainland (Tiberius preferred to stay on his island during this period). Claudilla likely accompanied her husband to Capri where the political intrigues were in full force during his youth.

=== Death and legacy ===
Claudilla died when giving birth to Caligula's first child who did not survive either. The exact date of her death is uncertain but is believed to have been 34, 36, or early 37. The ancient historian Cassius Dio incorrectly states that Caligula divorced her before she died.

It is hard to guess what the marriage would have meant to Caligula but he seems to have begun an affair with the woman Ennia Thrasylla, the wife of Naevius Sutorius Macro, only after Claudilla's death. Anthony Barrett has speculated that since Dio and Tacitus claim that Macro introduced his wife to Caligula upon Claudilla's death, that it is possible that Macro was taking advantage of the prince's vulnerable state and intended to gain influence by having his wife console the young man.

Ancient sources claim that Caligula ordered her father to commit suicide to deliver her a message, but the veracity of this claim is doubtful.

There were no known coins issued of Claudilla, possibly because she died before Caligula became emperor. There have however been falsified coins purported to be of Claudilla found.

Roman imperial historian Suetonius for unknown reasons almost entirely omits Claudilla from his account of the emperor's life. This may have been done because there was little opportunity to paint Caligula poorly during the period. Suetonius's portrayal of his later three marriages includes mentions of adultery, homosexuality and debauchery. Suetonius even twists Caligula's wife Milonia's fertility as a flaw.

A flat Sardonyx cameo (numbered 578) from the Marlborough gem collection is described as depicting Junia Claudia.

== Cultural depictions ==
In the opera Arminio by Heinrich Ignaz Franz Biber, parts of Claudilla are incorporated with those of the fellow historical woman Thusnelda to create the character "Claudia" who serves as a love interest for "Caligola". Claudilla is mentioned in I, Claudius and parts of her story are incorporated in the TV series into the character of Drusilla, Caligula's sister, who dies while pregnant with Caligula's child. Claudilla appears in Simon Turney's novel Caligula (2018). In the book Caligula is described to genuinely love her and is heartbroken upon her death. It is stated that the midwife refused to choose between her and the child and ended up losing both of them. She is mentioned by her husband in Caligula: The Tyranny of Rome as he laments that had she not died along with their son he may have turned out to be a different man. He describes her as beautiful and kind while explaining to the main character Rufus why he wants to save Rufus sons life.

== See also ==
- List of Roman women
- List of women who died in childbirth
- Women in ancient Rome
