= Irena Troupová =

Irena Troupová (Irena Troupova-Wilke) is a Czech soprano and early music specialist.

== Biography ==
Troupová studied singing with Terezie Blumová. She regularly performs in the Berlin State Opera, Berlin Symphony Orchestra and others. A 2023 publication stated that "the well-known soprano Irena Troupová who, after a period of interpreting Baroque music, has been focusing on 20th-century music in recent years."

Troupová's double CD recording, Schwer ist’s, das Schöne zu lassen, features music written by composers who were interned at the Theresienstadt Ghetto in Terezín as part of the Holocaust in Bohemia and Moravia during World War II.

== Discography ==
- Schütz: Musikalische Exequien; Schütz, et al.: Trauermusik
- Schütz, Praetorius, Schein, etc.: Funeral Music / Arman
- Monteverdi, C.: Vespers for the Feast of the Ascension (Arman)
