= Julio-Claudian dynasty =

Roman imperial dynasty

Julio-Claudian dynasty Latin: Domus Julio-Claudia
- Ancient Roman dynasty
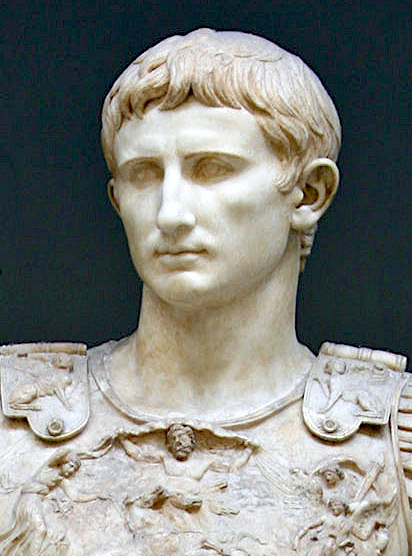
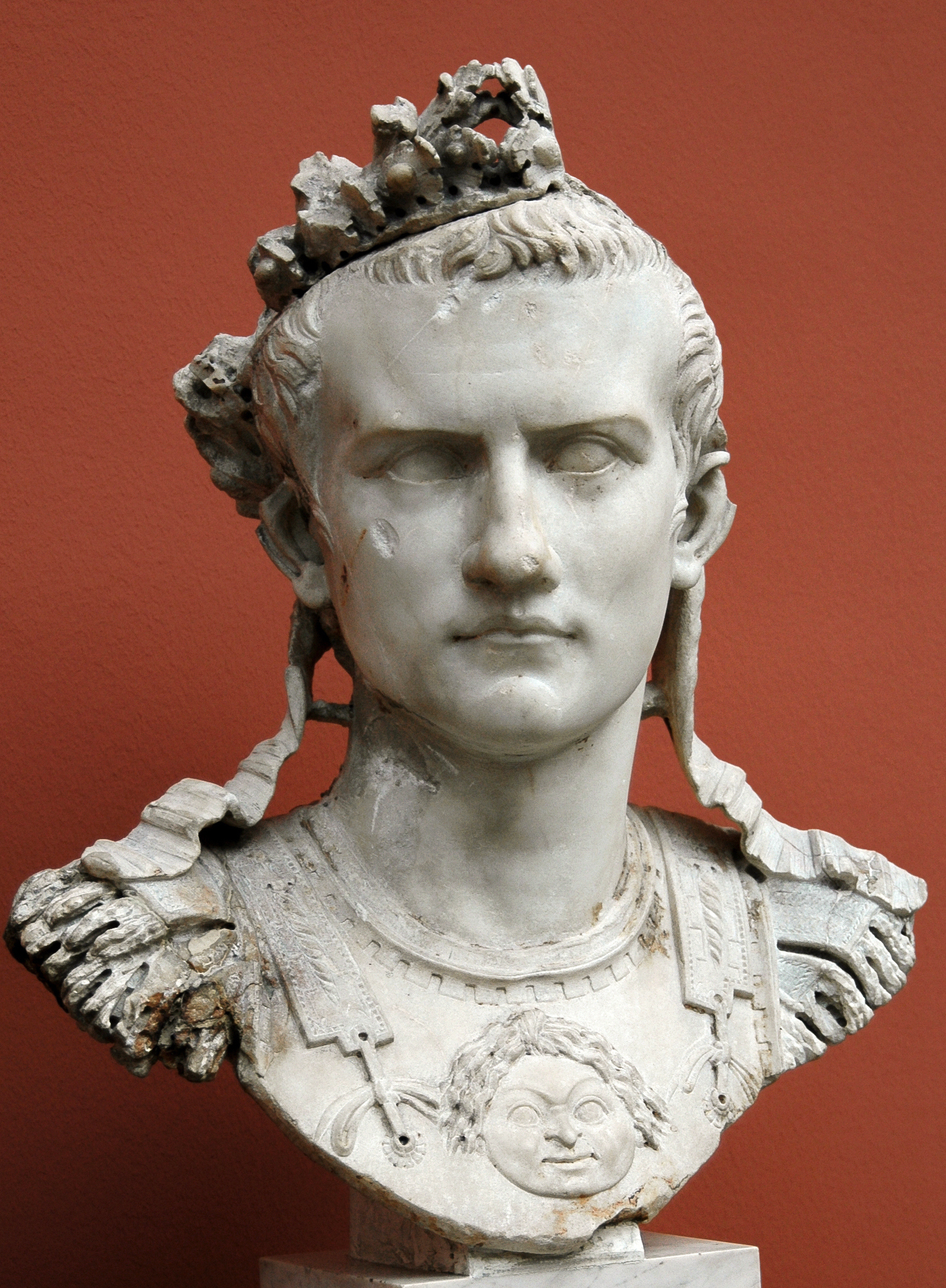
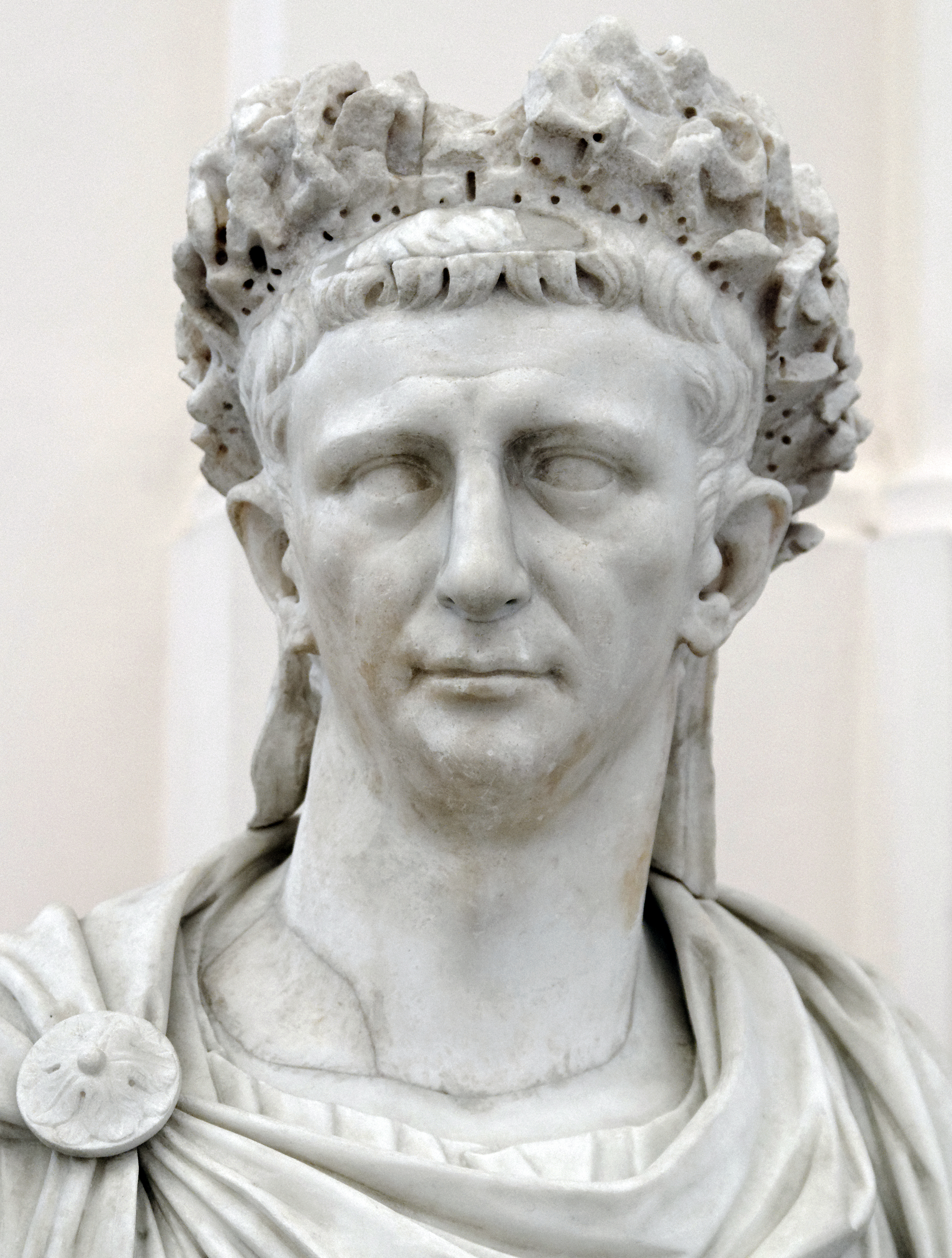
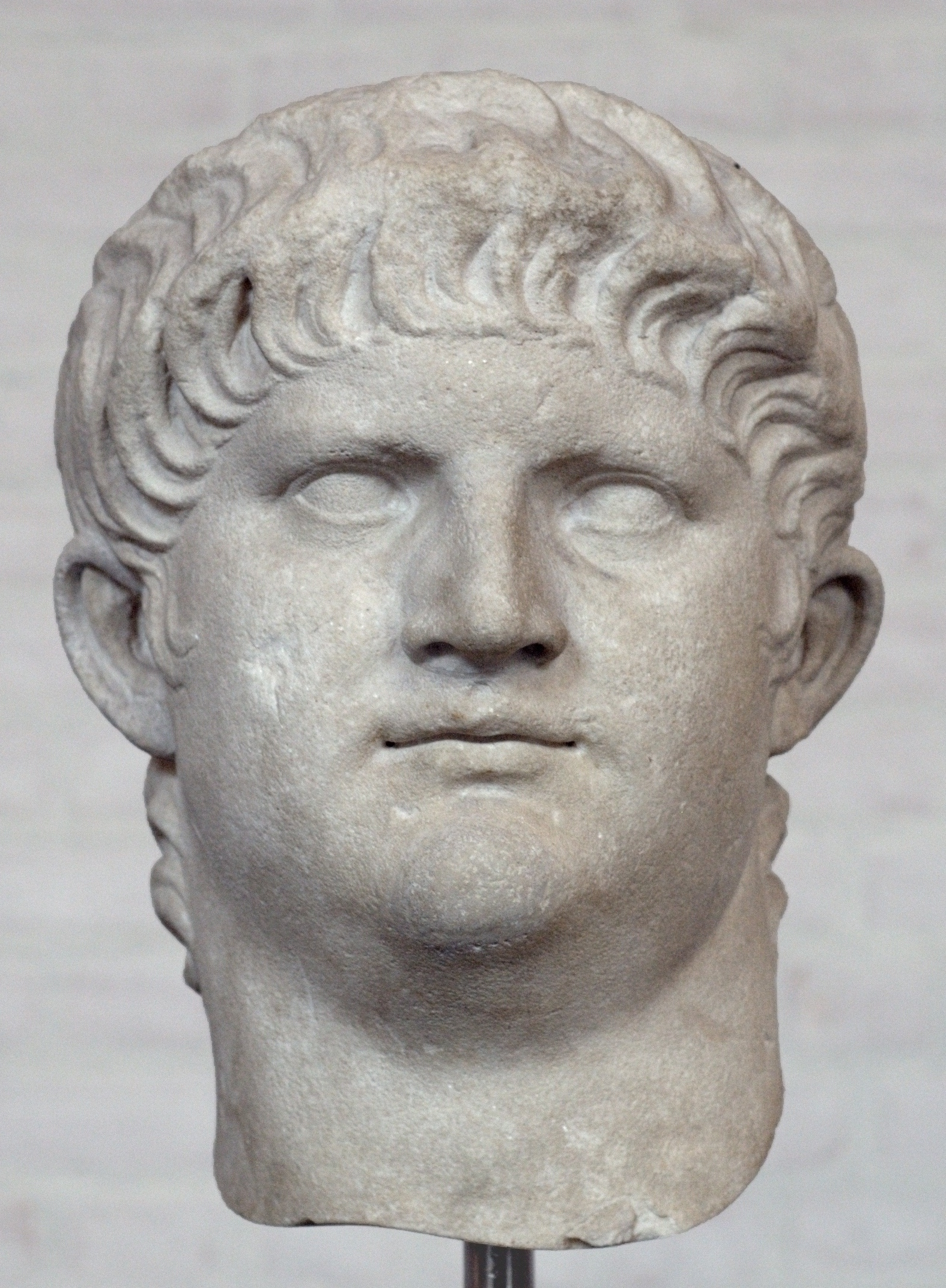
- Augustus Caligula Claudius Nero
- Parent house: Julii Caesares; Octavii Rufi; Claudii Nerones; Domitii Ahenobarbi
- Country: Roman Empire
- Founded: 27 BC
- Founder: Augustus
- Final ruler: Nero
- Titles: Roman emperor Pharaoh of Egypt; Prince of the Senate; Greatest Priest of Rome; Father of the Country
- Styles: "Imperator" "Caesar" "Augustus"
- Connected families: gens Julia; gens Claudia
- Estates: Imperial Palaces of the Palatine Hill; House of Augustus; Villa of Livia; Gardens of Maecenas; Domus Aurea; Domus Transitoria; Villa of Nero; Villa Jovis
- Deposition: AD 68 (deposed by Galba)

The Julio-Claudian dynasty comprised the first five Roman emperors: Augustus, Tiberius, Caligula, Claudius, and Nero.

This line of emperors ruled the Roman Empire, from its formation (under Augustus, in 27 BC) until the last of the line, Emperor Nero, committed suicide (in AD 68). (Note: There is some variation in usage; in strictly chronological contexts, it can be useful to distinguish between the long reign of Augustus and his Julio-Claudian (or Claudian) successors, the four of whom together reigned about as long as Augustus himself.)

The name Julio-Claudian is a historiographical term, deriving from the two families composing the imperial dynasty: the Julii Caesares and Claudii Nerones.

== Nomenclature ==
Julius and Claudius were two Roman family names; in classical Latin, they came second. Roman family names were inherited from father to son, but a Roman aristocrat could—either during his life or in his will—adopt an heir if he lacked a natural son. In accordance with Roman naming conventions, the adopted son would replace his original family name with the name of his adopted family. A famous example of this custom is Julius Caesar's adoption of his great-nephew, Gaius Octavius.

Primogeniture is notably absent in the history of the Julio-Claudian dynasty. Augustus, Caligula and Nero failed to father biological and legitimate sons. Tiberius' own son, Drusus predeceased him. Only Claudius was outlived by his son, Britannicus, although he opted to promote his adopted son Nero as his successor to the throne. Adoption ultimately became a tool that most Julio-Claudian emperors utilized in order to promote their chosen heir to the front of the succession. Augustus—himself an adopted son of his great-uncle, the Roman dictator Julius Caesar—adopted his stepson Tiberius as his son and heir. Tiberius was, in turn, required to adopt his nephew Germanicus, the father of Caligula and brother of Claudius. Caligula adopted his cousin Tiberius Gemellus (grandson of the emperor Tiberius) shortly before executing him. Claudius adopted his great-nephew and stepson Nero, who, lacking a natural or adopted son of his own, ended the reign of the Julio-Claudian dynasty with his fall from power and subsequent suicide.

Augustus (Imperator Caesar Divi Filius Augustus), as Caesar's adopted son and heir, discarded the family name of his natural father and initially renamed himself "Gaius Julius Caesar" after his adoptive father. It was also customary for the adopted son to acknowledge his original family by adding an extra name at the end of his new name. As such, Augustus' adopted name would have been "Gaius Julius Caesar Octavianus". However, there is no evidence that he ever used the name Octavianus.

Following Augustus' ascension as the first emperor of the Roman Empire in 27 BC, his family became a de facto royal house, known in historiography as the "Julio-Claudian dynasty". For various reasons, the Julio-Claudians followed in the example of Julius Caesar and Augustus by utilizing adoption as a tool for dynastic succession. The next four emperors were closely related through a combination of blood relation, marriage and adoption.

Tiberius (Tiberius Caesar Divi Augusti Filius Augustus), a Claudian by birth, became Augustus' stepson after the latter's marriage to Livia, who divorced Tiberius' natural father in the process. Tiberius' connection to the Julian side of the Imperial family grew closer when he married Augustus' only daughter, Julia the Elder. He ultimately succeeded Augustus as emperor in AD 14 after becoming his stepfather's adopted son and heir.

Caligula (Gaius Julius Caesar Augustus Germanicus) was born into the Julian and Claudian branches of the Imperial family, thereby making him the first actual "Julio-Claudian" emperor. His father, Germanicus, was the son of Nero Claudius Drusus and Antonia Minor, the son of Livia and the daughter of Octavia Minor respectively. Germanicus was also a great-nephew of Augustus on his mother's side and nephew of Tiberius on his father's side. His wife, Agrippina the Elder, was a granddaughter of Augustus. Through Agrippina, Germanicus' children—including Caligula—were Augustus' great-grandchildren. When Augustus adopted Tiberius, the latter was required to adopt his brother's eldest son as well, thus allowing Germanicus' side of the Imperial family to inherit the Julius nomen.

Claudius (Tiberius Claudius Caesar Augustus Germanicus), the younger brother of Germanicus, was a Claudian on the side of his father, Nero Claudius Drusus, younger brother of Tiberius. However, he was also related to the Julian branch of the Imperial family through his mother, Antonia Minor. As a son of Antonia, Claudius was a great-nephew of Augustus. Moreover, he was also Augustus' step-grandson due to the fact that his father was a stepson of Augustus. Unlike Tiberius and Germanicus, both of whom were born as Claudians and became adopted Julians, Claudius was not adopted into the Julian family. Upon becoming emperor, however, he added the Julian-affiliated cognomen Caesar to his full name.

Nero (Nero Claudius Caesar Augustus Germanicus) was a great-great-grandson of Augustus and Livia through his mother, Agrippina the Younger. The younger Agrippina was a daughter of Germanicus and Agrippina the Elder, as well as Caligula's sister. Through his mother, Nero was related by blood to the Julian and Claudian branches of the Imperial family. However, he was born into the Domitii Ahenobarbi on his father's side. Nero became a Claudian in name as a result of Agrippina's marriage to her uncle, Claudius, who ultimately adopted her son as his own. He succeeded Claudius in AD 54, becoming the last direct descendant of Augustus to rule the Roman Empire. Within a year of Nero's suicide in AD 68, the Julio-Claudian dynasty was succeeded by the Flavian emperors following a brief civil war over the vacant Imperial throne.

== Rise and fall of the Julio-Claudians ==
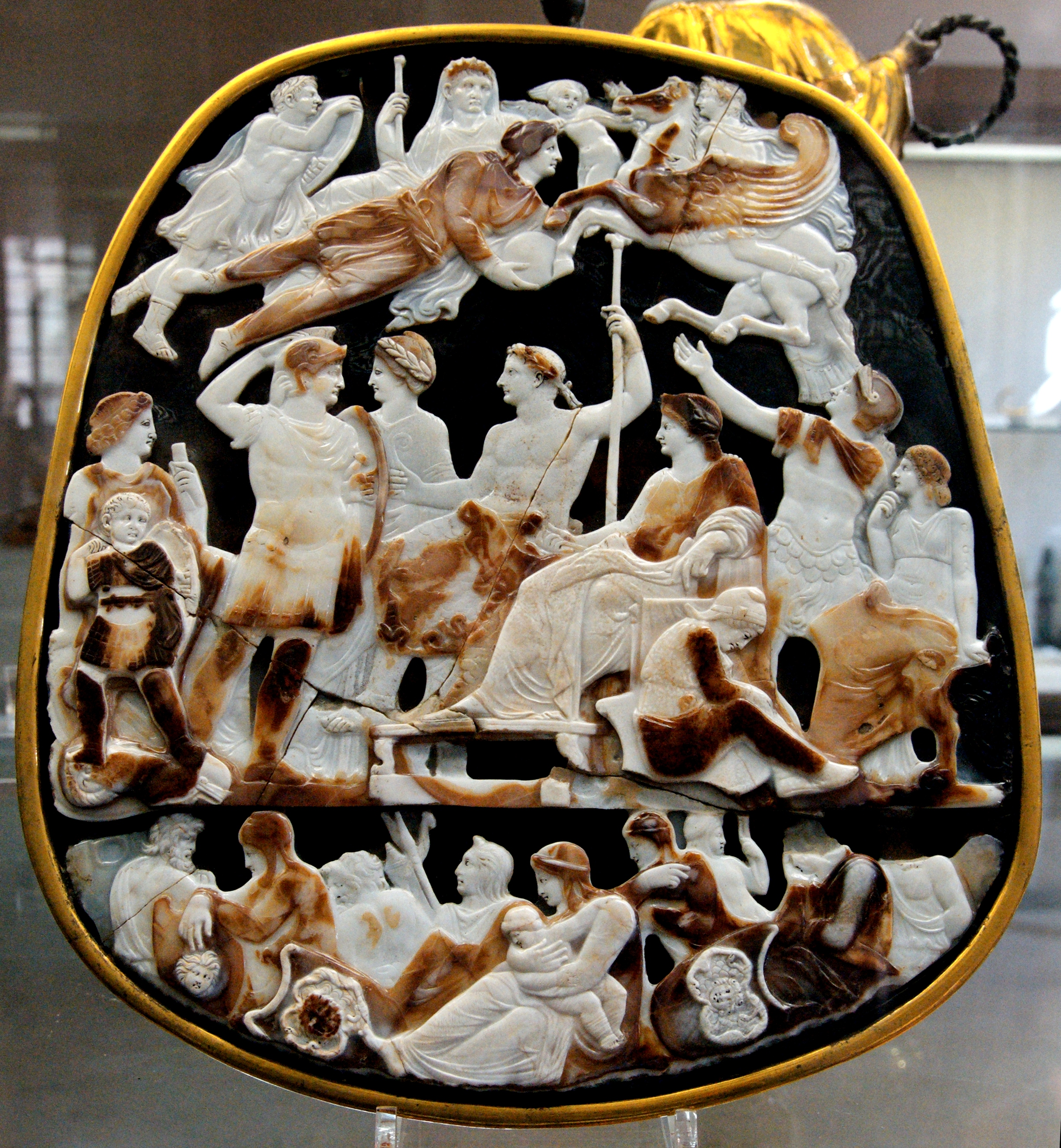
The Great Cameo of France, a cameo five layers sardonyx, Rome, c. AD 23, depicting the emperor Tiberius seated with his mother Livia and in front of his designated heir Germanicus, with the latter's wife Agrippina the Elder; above them float the deceased members of their house: Augustus, Drusus Julius Caesar, and Nero Claudius Drusus

=== Augustus ===
Lacking any male child and heir, Augustus married his only child—a daughter—Julia to his nephew Marcus Claudius Marcellus. Marcellus, however, died of food poisoning in 23 BC. Augustus then married his widowed daughter to his loyal friend, Marcus Vipsanius Agrippa, previously married to Augustus' niece, the sister of Marcellus. This marriage produced five children, three sons and two daughters: Gaius Caesar, Lucius Caesar, Julia the Younger, Agrippina the Elder, and Agrippa Postumus.

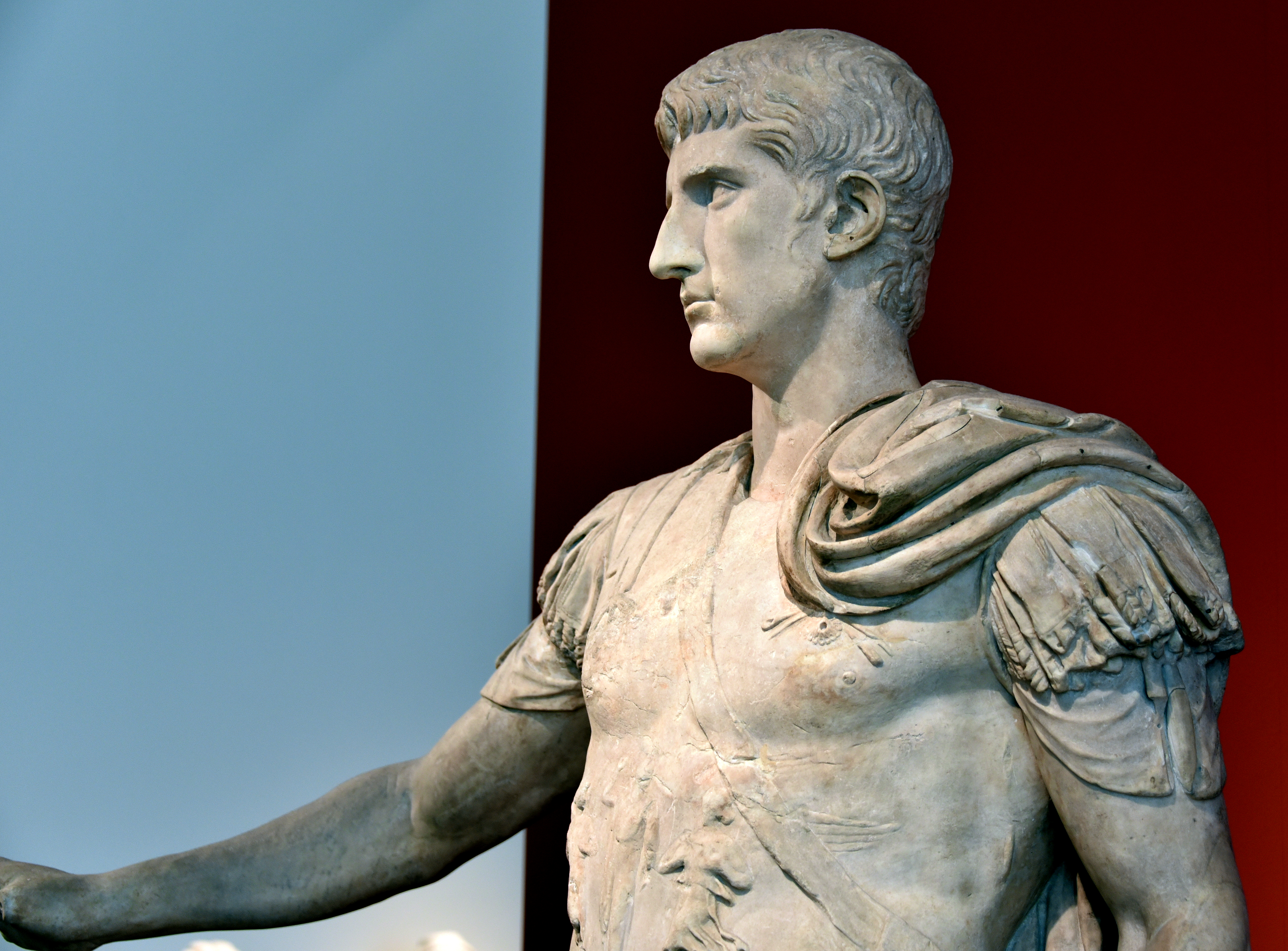
Statue of a Julio-Claudian prince; the head probably depicts Gaius Caesar, 5 BC – 14 AD, Altes Museum

Gaius and Lucius, the first two children of Julia and Agrippa, were adopted by Augustus and became heirs to the throne; however, Augustus also showed great favour toward his wife Livia's two children from her first marriage: Tiberius and Drusus. They were successful military leaders who had fought against the barbarian Germanic tribes.

Agrippa died in 12 BC, and Tiberius was ordered by Augustus to divorce his wife Vipsania Agrippina, daughter of Agrippa by his first marriage, and marry his stepsister, the twice-widowed Julia. Drusus, the brother of Tiberius, died in 9 BC after falling from a horse. Tiberius shared in Augustus' tribune powers, but shortly thereafter, in 6 BC, he went into voluntary exile in Rhodes. After the early deaths of both Lucius (AD 2) and Gaius (AD 4) and the exile of both Julia the Elder and Younger for adultery, a turn of events which saw the elder Julia's half brother Publius Cornelius Scipio exiled for treason, Mark Antony's son Iullus Antonius committing suicide and Julia the Younger's husband Lucius Aemilius Paullus being executed for conspiracy, Augustus was forced to recognize Tiberius as the next Roman emperor. Augustus banished his grandson Postumus Agrippa, who was adopted after the death of his brothers, to the small island of Planasia (around AD 6 or 7) where he was later executed, and Tiberius was recalled to Rome and officially adopted by Augustus. By Augustus' request, Tiberius adopted his nephew Germanicus, son of his late brother Drusus and biological great-nephew of Augustus through his mother. Germanicus subsequently married Augustus' granddaughter Agrippina.

=== Tiberius ===
On 19 August AD 14, Augustus died. Tiberius had already been established as Princeps in all but name, and his position as heir was confirmed in Augustus' will.

Despite his difficult relationship with the Senate, Tiberius' first years were generally good. He stayed true to Augustus's plans for the succession and favoured his adopted son and nephew Germanicus over his natural son, Drusus, as did the Roman populace. On Tiberius' request, Germanicus was granted proconsular power and assumed command in the prime military zone of Germania, where he suppressed the mutiny there and led the formerly restless legions on campaigns against Germanic tribes from AD 14 to 16. Germanicus died in Syria in AD 19 and, on his deathbed, accused the governor of Syria, Gnaeus Calpurnius Piso, of murdering him at Tiberius's orders. With Germanicus dead, Tiberius began elevating his own son Drusus to replace him as the Imperial successor. By this time Tiberius had left more of the day-to-day running of the Empire to Lucius Aelius Sejanus.

Sejanus created an atmosphere of fear in Rome, controlling a network of informers and spies whose incentive to accuse others of treason was a share in the accused's property after their conviction and death. Treason trials became commonplace; few members of the Roman aristocracy were safe. The trials played up to Tiberius' growing paranoia, which made him more reliant on Sejanus, as well as allowing Sejanus to eliminate potential rivals. Victims of this reign of terror related to the imperial family included Gaius Asinius Gallus Saloninus, second husband of Tiberius' first wife Vipsania, who had since died, and Decimus Haterius Agrippa, grandson of Agrippa and husband of Augustus' great-niece.

Tiberius, perhaps sensitive to this ambition, rejected Sejanus's initial proposal to marry Livilla, Germanicus' sister and the widow of Tiberius' son Drusus the Younger, who had since died, in AD 25, but later had withdrawn his objections so that, in AD 30, Sejanus was betrothed to Julia Livia, daughter of Livilla and Drusus the Younger. Sejanus' family connection to the Imperial house was now imminent, and in AD 31 Sejanus held the Consulship with the emperor as his colleague, an honour Tiberius reserved only for heirs to the throne. When he was summoned to a meeting of the Senate later that year on 18 October AD 31, he probably expected to receive a share of the tribunician power. Instead, however, Tiberius' letter to the Senate, completely unexpectedly, requested the destruction of Sejanus and his faction. A purge followed, in which Sejanus and his most prominent supporters were killed. With Drusus dead and having had Germanicus' elder two sons Nero and Drusus convicted of treason and killed, along with their mother Agrippina, Tiberius appointed Caligula, Germanicus' youngest son, and Tiberius Gemellus, the son of Drusus the Younger and grandson of Tiberius, co-heirs. Drusus III's wife Aemilia Lepida was later forced to commit suicide after being accused of adultery.

According to the historian Suetonius, Tiberius was known for his cruelty and debauchery through his perversion on the island of Capri, where he forced young boys and girls into orgies. On one account when one of the boys complained, Tiberius had his legs broken. Rome's second emperor died at the port town of Misenum on 16 March AD 37, at the age of 78 years, having reigned for 23 years. Suetonius writes that the Prefect of the Praetorian Guard Naevius Sutorius Macro smothered Tiberius with a pillow to hasten Caligula's accession.

=== Caligula ===
Although Augustus' succession plans were all but ruined due to the deaths of more than several family members, including many of his own descendants, in the end, Tiberius remained faithful to his predecessor's wishes that the next emperor would hail from the Julian side of the Imperial family. Thus, Tiberius was succeeded by Gaius Julius Caesar Augustus Germanicus, the sole-remaining son of his nephew and adopted son Germanicus. The new emperor was a great grandson of Augustus through his mother Agrippina the Elder thus making him a Julian but he was also a Claudian through his father Germanicus being the son of Livia's younger son Drusus the Elder. More commonly remembered in history by his childhood nickname Caligula, he was the third Roman Emperor ruling from AD 37 to 41.

When Tiberius died on 16 March AD 37, Caligula was well-positioned to assume power, despite the obstacle of Tiberius's will, which named him and his cousin Tiberius Gemellus as joint heirs. Caligula ordered Gemellus killed within his first year in power. Backed by Naevius Sutorius Macro, Caligula asserted himself as sole princeps, though he later had Macro disposed of as well. Following Gemellus' death, Caligula marked his brother-in-law, Marcus Aemilius Lepidus, husband of his sister Julia Drusilla, as his heir. However, after Drusilla's death, Lepidus was accused of having affairs with Caligula's other sisters Agrippina the Younger and Julia Livilla and he was executed. He had previously had Drusilla's first husband Lucius Cassius Longinus killed and upon the death of Agrippina's husband Gnaeus Domitius Ahenobarbus, he seized his inheritance.

Several unsuccessful assassination attempts were made on Caligula's life. The successful conspiracy that ended Caligula's life was hatched by the disgruntled Praetorian Guard with backing by the Senate. The historian Josephus claims that the conspirators wished to restore the Republic, while Suetonius claims their motivations were mostly personal. On 24 January AD 41, the Praetorian tribune Cassius Chaerea and his men stopped Caligula alone in an underground passage leading to a theatre. They stabbed him to death. Together with another tribune, Cornelius Sabinus, he killed Caligula's wife Caesonia and their infant daughter Julia Drusilla on the same day.

=== Claudius ===
After Caligula's death, the Senate attempted and failed to restore the Republic. Claudius, Caligula's paternal uncle, became emperor by the instigation of the Praetorian Guards.

Despite his lack of political experience, and the disapproval of the people of Rome, Claudius proved to be an able administrator and a great builder of public works. His reign saw an expansion of the empire, including the invasion of Britain in AD 43. He took a personal interest in the law, presided at public trials, and issued up to twenty edicts a day; however, he was seen as vulnerable throughout his rule, particularly by the nobility. Claudius was constantly forced to shore up his position—resulting in the deaths of many senators. Claudius also suffered tragic setbacks in his personal life. He married four times (to, in order, Plautia Urgulanilla, Aelia Paetina, Valeria Messalina and, finally, Agrippina the Younger) and is referenced by Suetonius as being easily manipulated. This is particularly evident during his marriage to Agrippina the Younger, his niece. Messalina saw several members of the dynasty eliminated, notably arranging for the executions of Claudius' nieces Julia Livilla, daughter of Germanicus and Agrippina the Elder, and Julia Livia, daughter of Livilla and Drusus the Younger, as well as Julia Livilla's husband Marcus Vinicius, her mother's husband Appius Junius Silanus, Gaius Asinius Pollio, son of Tiberius' first wife Vipsania by her second husband and whose brother Servius Asinius Celer was also killed around this time, Claudius' son-in-law Gnaeus Pompeius Magnus, and his parents Marcus Licinius Crassus Frugi and Scribonia. Messalina herself was finally executed after being charged with adultery.

Claudius' reign also included several attempts on his life. In order to gain political support, he married Agrippina and adopted his great-nephew Nero.

With his adoption on 25 February AD 50, Nero became heir to the throne, over Claudius' own son Britannicus. Claudius died on 13 October AD 54, and Nero became emperor. A number of ancient historians accuse Agrippina of poisoning Claudius, but details on these private events vary widely. These events are recounted in book 12 of the Annals of Tacitus, book 61 of Cassius Dio's Roman History, and in the biographies of Nero and Claudius by Suetonius.

=== Nero ===
Nero became emperor in AD 54 at sixteen, the youngest emperor yet. Like his maternal uncle Caligula before him, Nero was also a direct descendant of Augustus, a fact which made his ascension to the throne much easier and smoother than it had been for Tiberius or Claudius. Ancient historians describe Nero's early reign as being strongly influenced by his mother Agrippina the Younger, his tutor Seneca, and the Praetorian Prefect Burrus, especially in the first year. In the first year of his reign, Nero had left all of the day-to-day running of the Empire to his mother Agrippina the Younger. He was made Emperor over his step-brother, Claudius' son Britannicus, whom he had killed. Agrippina was believed to have poisoned Claudius, having allegedly poisoned her second husband Gaius Sallustius Crispus Passienus. She had also arranged the deaths of Caligula's third wife, Lollia Paulina and Messalina's mother Domitia Lepida the Younger. She saw that the dynasty's numbers dwindle with the execution of Marcus Junius Silanus Torquatus, a grandson of Julia the Younger, to strengthen Nero's claim, having previously arranged the death of his brother Lucius Junius Silanus Torquatus. In AD 55, Nero began taking on a more active role as an administrator. He was consul four times between AD 55 and 60. Nero consolidated power over time through the execution and banishment of his rivals and slowly usurped authority from the Senate. He reportedly arranged the death of his own mother and after divorcing his wife Claudia Octavia, daughter of Claudius' and Messalina, he had her killed. Other relatives whom Nero was believed to have had killed were Claudius' daughter by Aelia Paetina, Claudia Antonia, her husband and half-brother of Messalina, Faustus Cornelius Sulla Felix, Decimus Junius Silanus Torquatus, brother of Marcus and Lucius Junius Silanus Torquantus, as well as Marcus' son, also named Lucius, his aunt Domitia Lepida the Elder, and Rubellius Plautus, son of Julia Livia along with his wife, children and father-in-law.

In AD 64 Rome burned. Nero enacted a public relief effort as well as large reconstruction projects. To fund this, the provinces were heavily taxed following the fire.

By AD 65, senators complained that they had no power left and this led to the Pisonian conspiracy, led by Gaius Calpurnius Piso, an adoptive descendant of Triumvir Marcus Licinius Crassus, grandson of Gnaeus Calpurnius Piso, a governor of Syria who committed suicide after being accused of killing Germanicus, and first husband of Livia Orestilla, Caligula's second wife. The conspiracy failed and its members were executed. Vacancies after the conspiracy allowed Nymphidius Sabinus, a grandson of former imperial freedman Gaius Julius Callistus, who claimed to be an illegitimate son of Caligula, to rise in the Praetorian Guard.

In late AD 67 or early 68, Vindex, the governor of Gallia Lugdunensis in Gaul, rebelled against Nero's tax policies. Lucius Virginius Rufus, the governor of superior Germany, was sent to put down the rebellion. To gain support, Vindex called on Galba, the governor of Hispania Citerior (in the Iberian Peninsula), to become emperor. Virginius Rufus defeated Vindex's forces and Vindex committed suicide. Galba was declared a public enemy and his legion was confined in the city of Clunia.

Nero had regained the control of the empire militarily, but this opportunity was used by his enemies in Rome. Nymphidius Sabinus, who desired to become emperor himself, bribed the Praetorian Guard to betray Nero. Sabinus was later murdered in favour of Galba.

Nero reportedly committed suicide with the help of his scribe Epaphroditus. The Senate had been trying to preserve the dynastic bloodline by saving Nero's life, and were additionally reluctant to let someone who was not of the family become emperor; however, once he had committed suicide, and with Galba marching on the city, it had no choice but to declare him a public enemy posthumously. With his death, the reign of the Julio-Claudian dynasty came to an end. Chaos then ensued in the Year of the Four Emperors.

=== Survival after the fall of Nero ===
Augustus’s bloodline endured into the era of the Severan dynasty. It outlived Nero through the descendants of his first granddaughter, Julia the Younger, who married Lucius Aemilius Paullus and gave birth to Aemilia Lepida. After marrying Marcus Junius Silanus Torquatus, Aemilia gave birth to several children, including Junia Calvina and Junia Lepida. Although Calvina died childless, she was married to Lucius Vitellius, whose elder brother was the short-lived emperor Vitellius. Her younger sister, Junia Lepida, married Gaius Cassius Longinus and produced a daughter called Cassia Longina. The Roman general Gnaeus Domitius Corbulo married Cassia, who provided him with two daughters, including Domitia Longina, later wife of the emperor Domitian. By her first husband, Lucius Aelius Lamia Plautius Aelianus, Domitia Longina may have been the mother or maternal grandmother of Lucius Fundanius Lamia Aelianus. Fundanius married Rupilia, sister of Rupilia Faustina, and had a son, Lucius Plautius Lamia Silvanus, consul in AD 145, who, according to Historia Augusta, married his first cousin once removed Aurelia Fadilla (d. AD 135), the daughter of emperor Antoninus Pius and Faustina the Elder (Rupilia Faustina's daughter). (Note: Historia Augusta is considered dubious. However, modern scholarship accepts the marriage of Aurelia Fadilla and Silvanus as real and probably childless (see Kiest, Dietmar, 1990. Römische Kaisertabelle: Grundzüge einer römischen Kaiserchronologie , Darmstadt, p. 135; Levick, Barbara, 2014. Faustina I and II: Imperial Women of the Golden Age. Women in antiquity. Oxford: Oxford University Press. xi, 248; Magie, David, 1921. Historia Augusta, Life of Antoninus Pius, Note 7).) Fundanius and Rupilia were also the parents of Fundania, who married Faustina the Elder's brother Marcus Annius Libo, consul in AD 128. Fundania's offspring included Marcus Annius Libo, suffect consul in AD 161, and Annia Fundania Faustina (d. AD 192), wife of Titus Pomponius Proculus Vitrasius Pollio. Annia Fundania Faustina and both of her children, Titus Fundanius Vitrasius Pollio and Vitrasia Faustina (d. AD 182), were executed by Commodus on the charge of conspiracy. Her brother, Marcus, had a son by the name of Marcus Annius Sabinus Libo, a senator and curator of Lavinium, and through him a grandson, Marcus Annius Flavius Libo, who served as consul ordinarius AD 204.

In addition to Cassia Longina, Junia Lepida gave birth to a son called Cassius Lepidus. Around AD 80 Lepidus had a daughter named Cassia Lepida, who married Gaius Julius Alexander Berenicianus, a descendant of Herod the Great, Antiochus VIII Gryphus and Ptolemy VIII Physcon. Julia Cassia Alexandria, Lepida's daughter by Berenicianus, married Gaius Avidius Heliodorus and ultimately gave birth to Gaius Avidius Cassius. Avidius Cassius had three children with his wife, Volusia Vettia Maeciana; they were Avidius Heliodorus, Avidius Maecianus and Avidia Alexandra. In AD 175 Cassius was proclaimed emperor after he received erroneous news of the death of Marcus Aurelius, whose survival made Cassius a usurper of the empire. Cassius' rebellion ended three months into his bid for the throne when one of his centurions assassinated him in favour of Marcus Aurelius. Cassius' daughter, Avidia, is known to have had four children with her husband, Titius Claudius Dryantianus Antonius: Claudia Maeciana Alexandra, Claudia Vettia Agrippina, Claudia Dryantilla Platonis, who took part in the ludi saeculares of the year AD 204, and the senator Claudius Cassius Agrippinus, possibly recorded among the Arval Brethren in AD 213 or 214.

Tiberius’s bloodline survived into the 2nd century through the offspring of his granddaughter Julia Livia, wife of Gaius Rubellius Blandus. Apart from a son, Rubellius Plautus, executed by Nero in AD 62, Julia appears to have had a daughter, Rubellia Bassa, who married a maternal uncle of the future Roman Emperor Nerva by the name of Octavius Laenas. Together Laenas and Bassa had at least one child, a surmised son, who was the father of Sergius Octavius Laenas Pontianus, consul in AD 131.

Coat of Arms of the Colonna family, claim to be descended from the Julio-Claudian dynasty

Princely arms of the Gravina line of the Orsini family, claim to be descended from the Julio-Claudian dynasty

== Relationships among the rulers ==
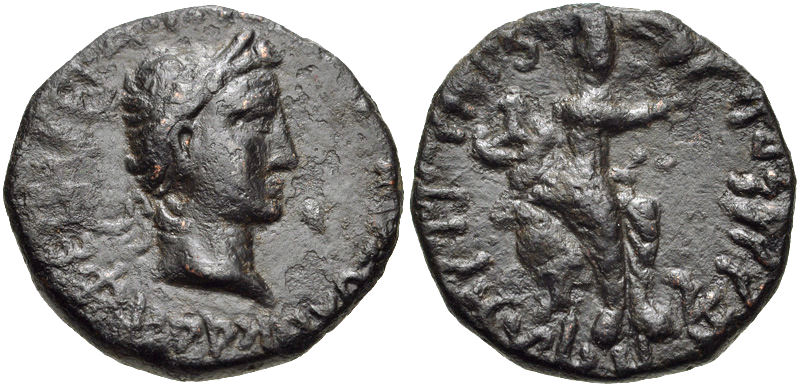
Coin of Kushan ruler Kujula Kadphises (circa AD 30/50–80). Obv Laureate "Julio-Claudian" style head right. Rev Kujula Kadphises seated right, raising hand; tripartite symbol to left.

The great-uncle/great-nephew blood relationship and/or adopted son relationship was commonly found among the rulers of the Julio-Claudian dynasty.

1. Augustus was the great-nephew and posthumously adopted son of Julius Caesar; his mother Atia was the daughter of Caesar's sister Julia.
2. Caligula was the great-nephew and adoptive grandson (via the adoption of his father Germanicus) of Tiberius; his father was the son of Tiberius' brother Drusus.
3. Claudius was the great-nephew of Augustus, as well as the nephew of Tiberius (and the only Julio-Claudian who was not adopted); his mother Antonia was the daughter of Augustus' sister Octavia, and his father Drusus was the brother of Tiberius.
4. Nero was the great-nephew and adopted son of Claudius; his mother Agrippina, in addition to being married to Claudius, was the daughter of Claudius' brother Germanicus.

The other recurring relationship between emperor and successor is that of stepfather/stepson, a relationship not by blood but by marriage:

1. Tiberius was Augustus' stepson due to the latter's marriage to Livia Drusilla. He and his brother Drusus were Livia's sons through her previous marriage to Tiberius Claudius Nero.
2. Nero, biological son of Gnaeus Domitius Ahenobarbus, became the stepson of his great-uncle Claudius when the emperor married his niece Agrippina the Younger.

The uncle/nephew relationship is also prominent:

1. Tiberius was Claudius's paternal uncle, being the older brother of Drusus, Claudius' father.
2. Claudius was Caligula's paternal uncle, being the younger brother of Germanicus, Caligula's father.
3. Caligula was Nero's maternal uncle, being the older brother of Agrippina the Younger, Nero's mother.

There were several instances of Emperors being father-in-law and son-in-law to each other:

1. Tiberius, in addition to being Augustus' stepson and adopted son, was married to Julia the Elder, daughter of Augustus.
2. Nero, in addition to being Claudius' great-nephew, stepson and adopted son, was married to Claudia Octavia, daughter of Claudius.

The following bullet points illustrate the lineage of Julio-Claudian emperors (adoptions included; emperors in bold):

- **Augustus**, adopted son of Julius Caesar
  - **Tiberius**, adopted son of Augustus
    - Germanicus, adopted son of Tiberius
      - **Caligula**, son of Germanicus
  - Drusus, stepson of Augustus
    - **Claudius**, son of Drusus
      - **Nero**, adopted son of Claudius

No Julio-Claudian emperor was a blood descendant of his immediate predecessor. Although Tiberius and Claudius had potential heirs (Tiberius Gemellus, grandson of Tiberius through his son Drusus, and Britannicus, son of Claudius, respectively) available for the succession, both were, in turn, ultimately succeeded by their great-nephews Caligula and Nero, respectively.

The fact that ordinary father-son (or grandfather-grandson) succession did not occur has contributed to the image of the Julio-Claudian court presented in Robert Graves's I, Claudius as a dangerous world where scheming family members were all too ready to murder the direct heirs so as to bring themselves, their own immediate families, or their lovers closer to the succession.

== Dynastic timeline ==
1. Augustus (27 BC – AD 14)
2. Tiberius (14–37)
3. Caligula (37–41)
4. Claudius (41–54)
5. Nero (54–68)

== See also ==
- Augustan and Julio-Claudian art
- Julia gens
- Flavian dynasty

== Notes ==
Preceded by Roman Republic	Julio-Claudian dynasty 30 BC – AD 68	Succeeded by Flavian dynasty
