= Family tree of Roman emperors =

This is a family tree of Roman emperors, showing only the relationships between the emperors.

== 27 BC –192 AD ==
The emperors from Augustus to Commodus can be organised into one large family tree.

Julius Caesar dictator perpetuo 100–44 BC	Julia Minor died 51 BC	Marcus Atius Balbus; 105–51 BC
Atia; 85–43 BC	Gaius Octavius c. 100–59 BC
Augustus; 63 BC–14 AD r. 27 BC – 14 AD	Livia Drusilla; 59 BC–29 AD	Tiberius Claudius Nero c. 80–33 BC	Octavia Minor c. 66–11 BC	Mark Antony triumvir 83–30 BC
Marcus Vipsanius Agrippa; 63–12 BC	Julia the Elder; 39 BC–14 AD	Tiberius; 42 BC–37 AD r. 14–37	Drusus the Elder; 38–9 BC	Antonia Minor; 36 BC–37 AD
Lucius Aemilius Paullus d. 14	Julia the Younger; 19 BC–28 AD	Agrippina the Elder; 14 BC–33 AD	Germanicus; 16 BC–19 AD	Claudius; 10 BC–54 AD r. 41–54
Marcus Torquatus	Aemilia Lepida; 4 BC–53 AD	Vespasian; 9–79 r. 69–79	Gnaeus Domitius Corbulo; 7–67	Milonia Caesonia; 6–41	Caligula; 12–41 r. 37–41	Agrippina the Younger; 15–59	Gnaeus Domitius Ahenobarbus; 17 BC–40 AD	Drusus Caesar; 8–33	Aemilia Lepida	Manius Aemilius Lepidus
Junia Calvina; 15–79	Lucius Vitellius the Younger; 16–69	Vitellius; 15–69 r. 69	Domitian; 51–96 r. 81–96	Domitia Longina; 53–130	Galba; 3 BC–69 AD r. 68–69	Aemilia Lepida
Ulpia	Marcus Ulpius Traianus; 30–100	Marcia; 33–100	Marcia Furnilla	Titus; 39–81 r. 79–81	Nerva; 30–98 r. 96–98	Cocceia	Lucius Salvius Otho Titianus	Otho; 32–69 r. 69	Poppaea Sabina; 30–65	Nero; 37–68 r. 54–68
Publius Aelius Hadrianus Afer	Trajan; 53–117 r. 98–117	Ulpia Marciana; 48–112
Salonia Matidia; 68–119
Hadrian; 76–138 r. 117–138	Vibia Sabina; 80–137	Rupilia Faustina; 87–138
Marcus Annius Verus	Faustina the Elder; 100–141	Antoninus; 86–161 r. 138–161
Marcus Aurelius; 121–180 r. 161–180	Faustina the Younger; 125–175
Commodus; 161–192 r. 180–192	Lucilla; 148–182	Lucius Verus; 130–169 r. 161–169

== 192–235 ==
The emperors from Pertinax to the beginning of the Crisis can be organised into one large dynasty (see Severan dynasty family tree), one smaller family and two unrelated emperors.

Pertinax; 126–193 r. 192–193	Didius Julianus; 133–193 r. 193
Septimius Severus; 145–211 r. 193–211	Julia Domna; 160–217	Julia Maesa; 165–224	Macrinus; 165–218 r. 217–218
Caracalla; 188–217 r. 211–217	Geta; 189–211 r. 211	Julia Soaemias; 180–222	Julia Avita Mamaea; 180–235	Diadumenian; 208–218 r. 218
Elagabalus; 204–222 r. 218–222	Severus Alexander; 208–235 r. 222–235

== 235–284 ==
The emperors during the fifty-year period of the Crisis can be organised into eight families and six unrelated emperors, although no family held power for more than fifteen years.

Maximinus I 173–238 r. 235–238	Gordian I 159–238 r. 238–238	Pupienus; 178–238 r. 238–238	Balbinus; 165–238 r. 238–238
Gordian II; 192–238 r. 238–238	Maecia Faustina b. 201	Philip; 204–249 r. 244–249	Decius; 201–251 r. 249–251	Gallus; 206–253 r. 251–253
Aemilianus; 210–253 r. 253–253	Gordian III; 225–244 r. 238–244	Valerian; 200–260 r. 253–260	Philip II r. 247–249	Etruscus; 227–251 r. 251–251	Hostilian; 230–251 r. 251–251	Volusianus d. 253 r. 251–253
Claudius II; 213–270 r. 268–270	Quintillus; 220–270 r. 270–270	Gallienus; 218–268 r. 253–268	Aurelian; 214–275 r. 270–275	Tacitus; 200–276 r. 275–276	Florianus d. 276 r. 276
Probus; 232–282 r. 276–282	Carus; 230–283 r. 282–283
Carinus d. 285 r. 283–285	Numerian d. 284 r. 283–284

== 284–518 ==
The emperors from the founding of the Dominate in 284, in the West until 476 and in the East until 518, can be organised into one large dynasty plus various unrelated emperors. During most of this period, though not always, there were two senior emperors ruling in separate courts. This division became permanent after the death of Theodosius I in 395.

Western Roman Empire
Eastern Roman Empire

Diocletian; 244–311 r. 284–305	Prisca d. 315
Afranius; Hannibalian	Eutropia d. 325	Maximian; 250–310 r. 286–305	Valeria	Galerius; 260–311 r. 305–311	unknown sister
Severus II r. 306–307	Maximiana; Theodora	Constantius I 250–306 r. 305–306	Julia Helena; 250–330	Maxentius; 278–312 r. 306–312	Valeria; Maximilla	Maximinus II; 270–313 r. 311–313
Eutropia d. 350	Julius; Constantius d. 337	Licinius c.265–325 r. 311–324	Constantia; 293–330	Constantine I 272–337 r. 306–337	Fausta; 289–326	Valerius Valens r. 316–317	Martinian r. 324
Nepotianus r. 350	Julianus II; 331–363 r. 361–363	Helena d. 360	Constantine II; 316–340 r. 337–340	Constantius II; 317–361 r. 337–361	Constans I 323–350 r. 337–350	Magnentius r. 350–353
Jovian; 331–364 r. 363–364	Procopius (cousin) r. 365–366	Marina Severa d. 375	Valentinian I 321–375 r. 364–375	Justina d. 388	Valens; 328–378 r. 364–378
Magnus Maximus r. 383–388	Constantia; 362–383	Gratian; 359–383 r. 375–383	Aelia Flaccilla d. 385	Theodosius I 347–395 r. 379–395	Galla d. 394	Valentinian II; 371–392 r. 388–392
Victor c. r. 385–388	Eugenius r. 392–394	Constantine III r. 407–411	Priscus Attalus r. 409	Honorius; 384–423 r. 395–423	Arcadius; 377–408 r. 395–408	Galla Placidia; 392–450	Constantius III r. 421
Constans II r. 409–411	Marcian; 396–457 r. 450–457	Pulcheria; 399–453	Theodosius II; 401–450 r. 408–450	Joannes r. 423–424
unknown brother	Leo I 401–474 r. 457–474	Verina d. 484	Basiliscus r. 475–476	Euphemia	Anthemius; 420–472 r. 467–472	Petronius Maximus; 397–455 r. 455	Licinia Eudoxia; 422–462	Valentinian III; 419–455 r. 425–455
Marcus r. 475–476	Avitus; 385–456 r. 455–456	Majorian; 420–461 r. 457–461	Severus III r. 461–465	Olybrius r. 472	Placidia	Glycerius r. 473–474
niece of Leo I	Julius Nepos r. 474–475	Zeno r. 474–475 r. 476–491	Ariadne; 450–515	Anastasius I 430–518 r. 491–518	Leontia	Marcianus	Orestes c. 420–476
Leo II; 467–474 r. 474	Romulus c. 465–520? r. 475–476
