= Junius Silanus =

Junius Silanus may refer to:

- Appius Junius Silanus, Roman senator, executed by the emperor Claudius
- Gaius Junius Silanus, Roman senator, convicted of treason under the emperor Tiberius
- Decimus Junius Silanus (disambiguation)
- Lucius Junius Silanus
- Marcus Junius Silanus (disambiguation)

== See also ==
- Junii Silani
