= Decimus Junius Silanus =

Decimus Junius Silanus may refer to:

- Decimus Junius Silanus (translator of Mago), who lived in the 2nd century BC, and was an expert in Punic language and literature
- Decimus Junius Silanus (consul), became consul of the Roman Republic in 62 BC
- Decimus Junius Silanus, Roman senator exiled by the emperor Augustus
- Decimus Junius Silanus Torquatus (died 64), Consul of the Roman Republic in 53

== See also ==
- Junia gens
