= Triaria gens =

Ancient Roman family

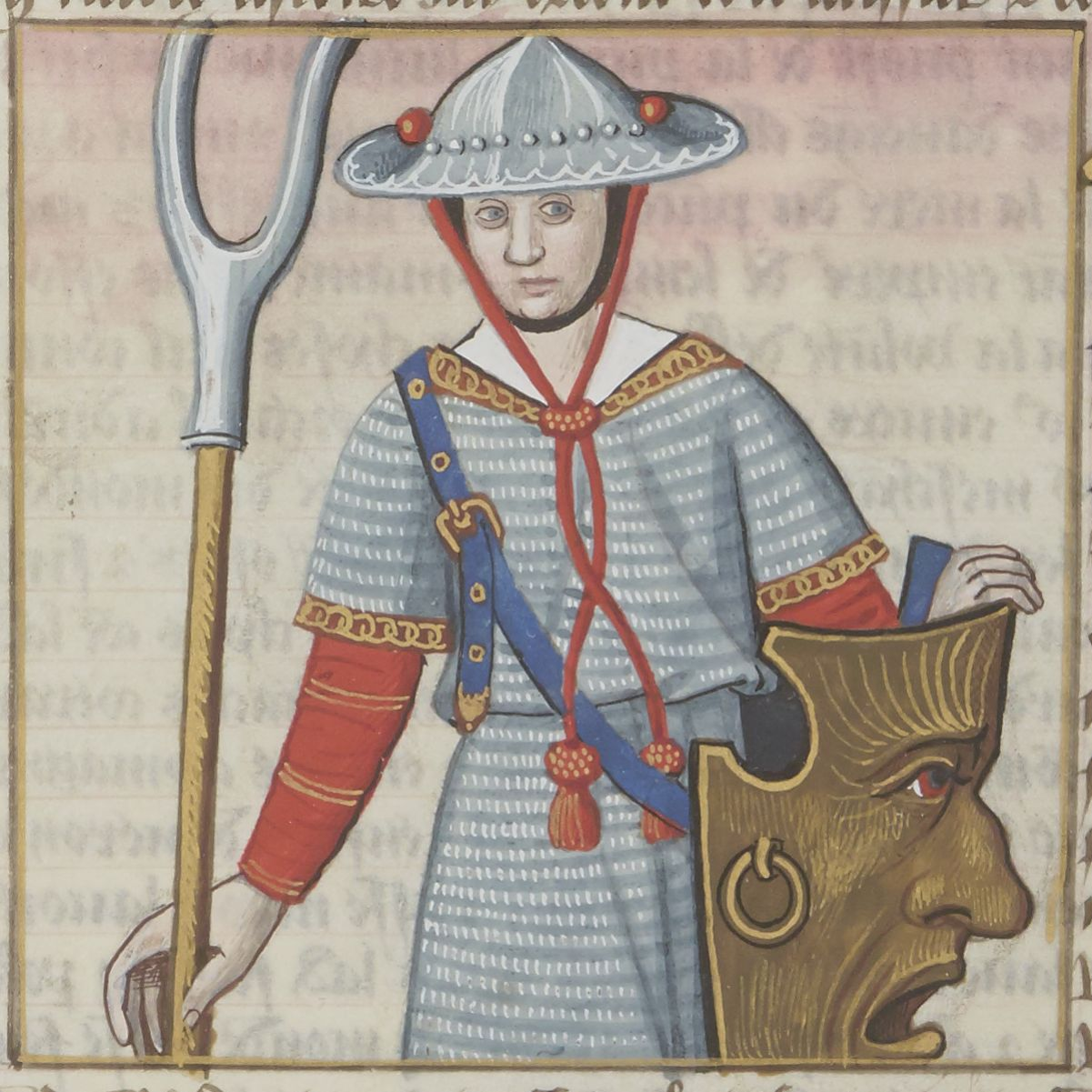
Triaria, the sister-in-law of Vitellius, armed with a bident, in an illustration from Boccaccio's On Famous Women.

The gens Triaria was an obscure plebeian family of ancient Rome. Only a few members of this gens are mentioned by Roman writers, but two of them attained the consulship in imperial times. Other Triarii are known from inscriptions.

== Origin ==
The nomen Triarius is based on the Latin number tres, three. A triarius was a veteran soldier who stood in the third rank of an infantry formation.

== Members ==
This list includes abbreviated praenomina. For an explanation of this practice, see filiation.

- Triarius, a rhetorician set up as a foil for Gaius Asinius Pollio in Seneca's Controversiae. He also appears in Seneca's Suasoriae.
- Lucius Triarius L. l. Hermogenes, a freedman buried at Puteoli in Campania, in a first-century tomb built by his mother, the freedwoman Clodia Musa Chreste, and Dionysius Hermogenes.
- Triaria, the second wife of Lucius Vitellius, and sister-in-law of the emperor Vitellius. Tacitus writes that she secured the execution of Gnaeus Cornelius Dolabella, who had been banished by Otho, and returned to Rome after Otho's death. She was accused of arming herself with a sword and behaving with unbecoming pride at the sack of Tarracina, although during the Renaissance, Boccaccio portrays her as an example of womanly bravery.
- Triarius, a friend of Pliny the Younger, who agreed to represent him in a legal matter, provided that Triarius allow Pliny to have Cremutius Ruso, a promising young advocate, assist him in the pleading.
- Triaria Magia Secundilla, together with her son, Marcus Rubrenus Magianus, dedicated a tomb at Antioch, dating to the late first or early second century, for her husband, perhaps named Marcus Rubrenus, (Note: His name has not been preserved in the inscription, but his praenomen and nomen were probably the same as his son's.) who had been tribune of the plebs, quaestor, military tribune in the Legio II Augusta, and decemvir stlitibus judicandis.
- Triarius Maternus, surnamed Lascivius, (Note: The only source for this surname is the Historia Augusta, which may have assigned it derisively; but it was the surname of other Romans, and could have belonged to Maternus.) consul in AD 185, during the reign of Commodus. Following the emperor's assassination at the end of 192, members of the Praetorian Guard attempted to set him up as a rival to Pertinax, who had been proclaimed emperor, but Maternus fled to Pertinax, who dismissed him unharmed.
- Aulus Triarius Rufus, consul in AD 210, was probably the son of Triarius Maternus.

=== Undated Triarii ===
- Quintus Triarius Q. f. Dexter, buried at Rome, aged forty, in a tomb dedicated by his friend, Sergia Thais.

== See also ==
- List of Roman gentes

== Bibliography ==
- Lucius Annaeus Seneca (Seneca the Elder), Controversiae, Suasoriae (Rhetorical Exercises).
- Gaius Plinius Caecilius Secundus (Pliny the Younger), Epistulae (Letters).
- Publius Cornelius Tacitus, Historiae.
- Dictionary of Greek and Roman Biography and Mythology, William Smith, ed., Little, Brown and Company, Boston (1849).
- Theodor Mommsen et alii, Corpus Inscriptionum Latinarum (The Body of Latin Inscriptions, abbreviated CIL), Berlin-Brandenburgische Akademie der Wissenschaften (1853–present).
- René Cagnat et alii, L'Année épigraphique (The Year in Epigraphy, abbreviated AE), Presses Universitaires de France (1888–present).
- Paul von Rohden, Elimar Klebs, & Hermann Dessau, Prosopographia Imperii Romani (The Prosopography of the Roman Empire, abbreviated PIR), Berlin (1898).
- D.P. Simpson, Cassell's Latin and English Dictionary, Macmillan Publishing Company, New York (1963).
- Edward Champlin, "Notes on the Heirs of Commodus", in The American Journal of Philology, vol. 100, No. 2, pp. 288–306 (Summer 1979).
- Margaret M. Roxan, Roman Military Diplomas, vol. 3, 1985–1993, University College, London (1994).
