= Junia gens =

Ancient Roman family

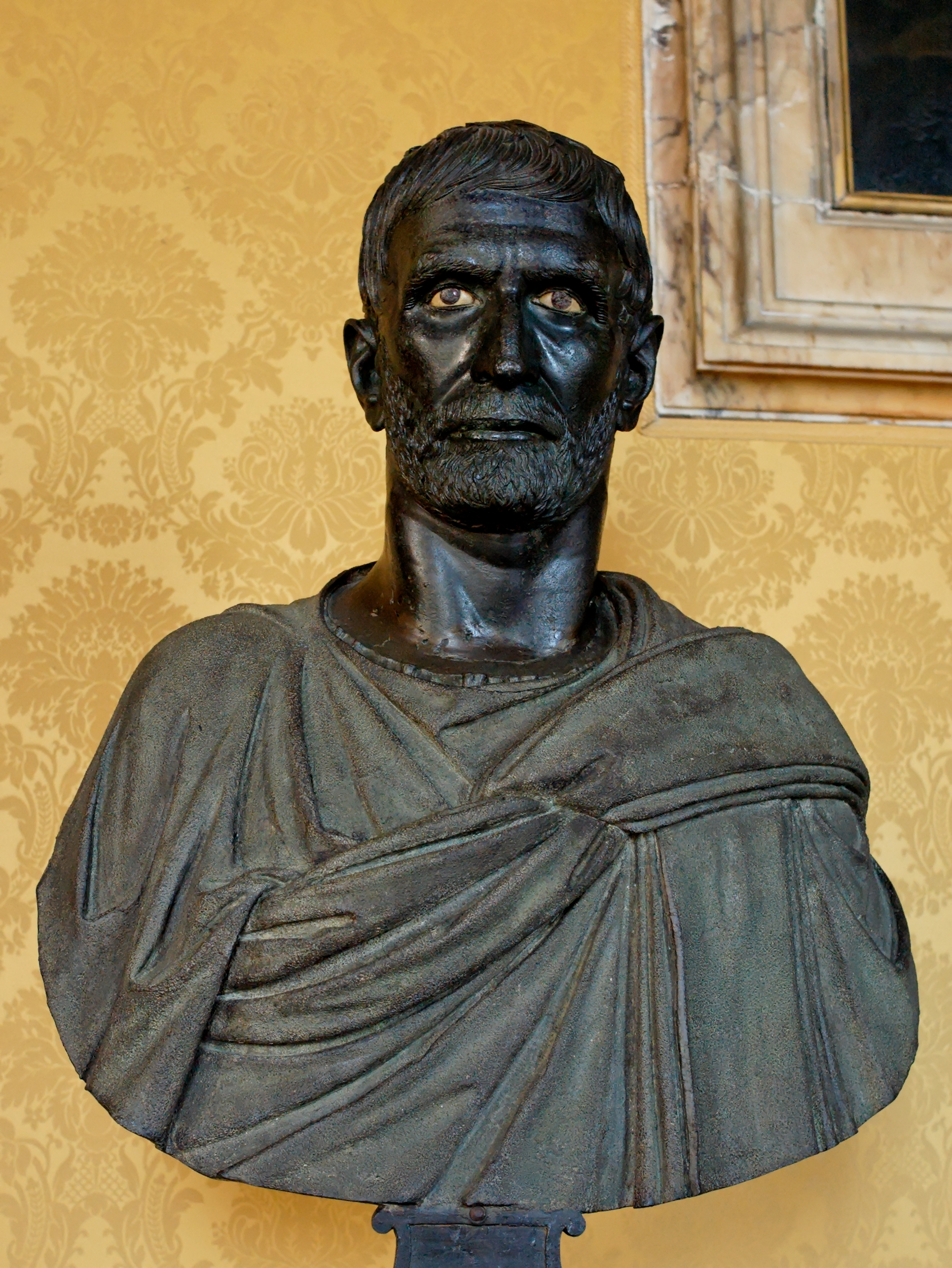
Bust in the Capitoline Museums, traditionally identified as Lucius Junius Brutus

The gens Junia or Iunia was one of the most celebrated families of ancient Rome. The gens may originally have been patrician, and was already prominent in the last days of the Roman monarchy. Lucius Junius Brutus was the nephew of Lucius Tarquinius Superbus, the seventh and last king of Rome, and on the expulsion of Tarquin in 509 BC, he became one of the first consuls of the Roman Republic.

Over the next several centuries, the Junii produced a number of very eminent men, such as Gaius Junius Bubulcus Brutus, three times consul and twice dictator during the period of the Samnite Wars, as well as Marcus and Decimus Junius Brutus, among the leaders of the conspiracy against Caesar. Although the Junii Bruti disappeared at the end of the Republic, another family, the Junii Silani, remained prominent under the early Empire.

== Origin ==
Junius, the nomen of the gens, may be etymologically connected with the goddess Juno, after whom the month of Junius was also named.

Scholars have long been divided on the question of whether the Junii were originally patrician. The family was prominent throughout the whole of Roman history, and all of the members who are known, from the early times of the Republic and on into the Empire, were plebeians. However, it seems inconceivable that Lucius Junius Brutus, the nephew of Tarquin the Proud, was a plebeian. So jealous of their prerogatives were the patricians of the early Republic, that in 450 BC, the second year of the Decemvirate, a law forbidding the intermarriage of patricians and plebeians was made a part of the Twelve Tables, the fundamental principles of early Roman law. It was not until the passage of the lex Licinia Sextia in 367 BC that plebeians were permitted to stand for the consulship.

Still, it has been suggested that the divisions between the orders were not firmly established during the first decades of the Republic, and that as many as a third of the consuls elected before 450 may in fact have been plebeians. Even if this were not the case, the consuls chosen at the very birth of the Roman Republic may have been exceptions. On balance, it seems more likely that the Junii were at first numbered amongst the patricians, and that they afterward passed over to the plebeians; but this question may remain unsettled.

At the end of the Republic, the Junii Silani were raised to patrician status by Augustus, and one of them even held the office of Flamen Martialis; but this family was descended from one of the Silani who had been adopted from the patrician gens Manlia. Several of them bore the surname Torquatus, the name of a great family of the Manlia gens.

== Praenomina ==
The praenomina favored by the early Junii were Marcus, Lucius, and Decimus. Except for the Bruti Bubulci, who favored the praenomen Gaius and may have been a cadet branch of the family, the Junii Bruti relied exclusively on these three names. Many of the other families of the Junii also used these names, although some added Gaius and others Quintus. The Junii were by far the most prominent family to make regular use of Decimus.

The names Titus and Tiberius were carefully avoided by the Junii throughout most of their history. According to tradition, these were the names of the sons of Lucius Junius Brutus, the first consul, who joined in a conspiracy by their uncles, the Vitellii, to restore the Tarquins to power. They were condemned and executed by order of their own father, and this disgrace led to the abandonment of their names by future generations. The only noteworthy exception appears to be the orator Titus Junius, who lived in the final century of the Republic.

== Branches and cognomina ==
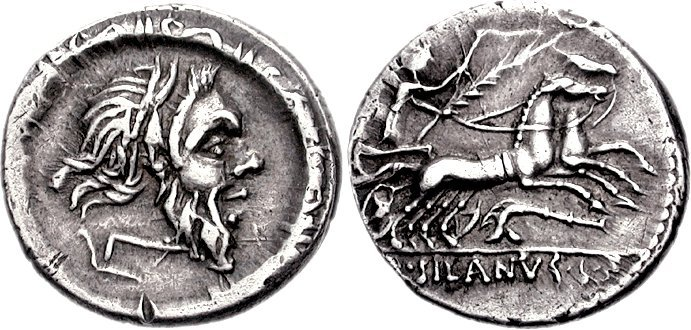
Denarius of Decimus Junius Silanus, 91 BC. The obverse depicts a mask of Silenus within a torque, alluding to both the surname Silanus and their descent from the Manlii Torquati, and a plough, perhaps alluding to the dictator Gaius Junius Bubulcus Brutus. On the reverse Victoria drives a biga over a carnyx.

The family names and surnames of the Junii which occur in the time of the Republic are, Brutus, Bubulcus, Gracchanus, Paciaecus, Pennus, Pera, Pullus, and Silanus. Norbanus was formerly supposed to be a surname of the Junia gens, but in fact it seems to have been a gentile name. A few Junii are mentioned without any cognomen. Many Junii appear under the Empire with other surnames, but most of them cannot be regarded as part of the gens; these included many descendants of freedmen, and of citizens enrolled during the magistracies of the various Junii.

Brutus was the name of a plebeian family of the Junia gens, which claimed descent from Lucius Junius Brutus. This possibility was denied by some ancient authorities, on the grounds that the first consul was a patrician, and because his two sons preceded him in death. However, one tradition states that there was a third son, from whom the later Bruti were descended. It is not impossible that there were younger sons, or that the elder sons had children of their own. Brutus is also known to have had a brother, who was put to death by his uncle the king, and there may have been other relatives. Moreover, Niebuhr raised the possibility that Brutus himself was a plebeian. But even if he had been a patrician, as the weight of tradition holds, his descendants may still have gone over to the plebeians.

The name of Brutus is said to have been given to Lucius because he feigned idiocy after the execution of his brother, in hope of avoiding the same fate. However, his father is also referred to as Brutus by the ancient authorities, and while this may have come about merely for narrative convenience, it is possible that the surname had already been borne by the family for some time. According to Festus, the older meaning of the adjective brutus was "serious" or "grave", in which case the surname is much the same as Severus. A less probable explanation suggests a common origin with the name with that of the Bruttii, a people of southern Italy who broke away from the Samnites in the fourth century BC, and whose name is said to have meant, "runaway slaves".

The surname Bubulcus refers to one who plows with oxen. The only persons known to have borne this cognomen also bore that of Brutus, and therefore may have belonged to that family, rather than a distinct stirps of the Junia gens. If so, the Bubulci were the only members of the family to use the praenomen Gaius. They appear in history during the Second Samnite War, at the same time as the other Junii Bruti emerge from two centuries of obscurity, with the agnomen Scaeva. This suggests that the family may have split into two distinct branches about this time.

The origin of the cognomen Pera, which appears in the middle of the third century BC, is not known, but the filiations of the two Perae suggest that they may have been descended from the Junii Bruti. Pennus, also a surname of the Quinctia gens, is probably derived from a Latin adjective meaning "sharp". This family flourished for about a century from the time of the Second Punic War. The surname Gracchanus was assumed by one of the Junii in the latter part of the second century BC, on account of his friendship with Gaius Gracchus. Paciaecus or Paciacus, the cognomen of another member of the gens, does not appear to be of Roman origin, although it may be that Paccianus or Pacianus is the correct form.

Silanus appears to be a lengthened form of Silus, "snub-nosed", which occurs as a cognomen in the Sergia and Terentia gentes, and is not connected with the Greek Silenus, who was nonetheless depicted on their coins. (Note: One coin of the Silani also seems to allude to Gaius Junius Bubulcus Brutus, perhaps indicating descent from the Bubulci, although it was not unusual for moneyers to depict the past achievements of one's gentiles without there being a close relationship.) In manuscripts the variants Syllanus and Sillanus are found. The Junii Silani first appear in history during the Second Punic War, and for the next four hundred years they occupied the highest offices of the state. From the middle of the second century BC, at least some of the Silani were descended from the patrician Manlii, from whom they inherited the additional surname Torquatus. In 30 BC, Augustus raised Marcus Junius Silanus to the patriciate. Many of this family were related to, or even descended from, Augustus and the emperors of the Julio-Claudian dynasty.

== Members ==
This list includes abbreviated praenomina. For an explanation of this practice, see filiation.

=== Junii Bruti ===
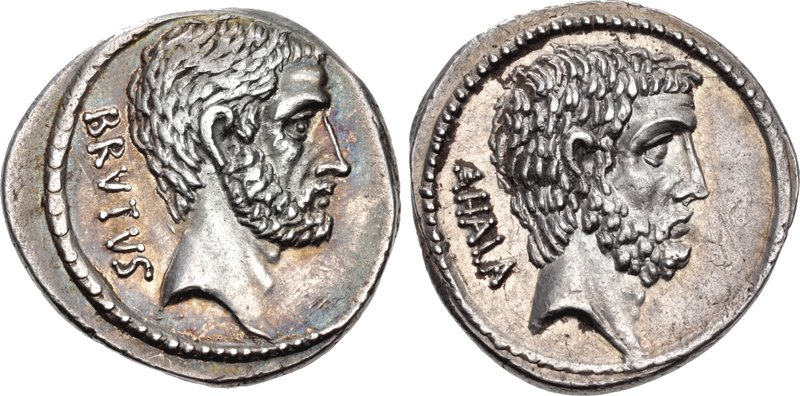
Denarius of Marcus Junius Brutus, 54 BC, depicting Lucius Junius Brutus on the obverse, and Gaius Servilius Ahala on the reverse. The tyrannicide Brutus claimed both as ancestors.

- Marcus Junius Brutus, father of the consul of 509 BC, married Tarquinia, sister of Lucius Tarquinius Superbus. Dionysius states that Tarquin had him put to death, along with his elder son, in order to obtain a family treasure; Livy states only that the son was among the Roman aristocrats put to death as potential threats to the royal authority.
- Marcus Junius M. f. Brutus, the elder brother of the consul Brutus, was put to death by his uncle, the king.
- Lucius Junius M. f. Brutus, tribune of the celeres under his uncle, Lucius Tarquinius Superbus, whom he helped to overthrow in 509 BC. He subsequently became one of the first consuls, and was slain the same year at the Battle of Silva Arsia.
- Titus Junius L. f. M. n. Brutus, son of the consul of 509 BC, together with his brother, Tiberius, joined in a conspiracy of Roman aristocrats to restore Tarquin to the throne. When the plot was uncovered, their own father had them put to death for treason.
- Tiberius Junius L. f. M. n. Brutus, the brother of Titus, with whom he was executed for conspiring to restore the Tarquins, in 509 BC.
- Lucius Junius Brutus, according to Dionysius, one of the first tribunes of the people in 493 BC, a plebeian who assumed the surname Brutus in honor of the first consul.
- Titus Junius Brutus, plebeian aedile in 491 BC, was ordered by the tribunes of the plebs to arrest Coriolanus.
- Decimus Junius Brutus Scaeva, magister equitum in 339 BC; consul in 325, he defeated the Vestini, and took the towns of Cutina and Cingilia.
- Gaius Junius C. f. C. n. Bubulcus Brutus, consul in 317, 313, and 311 BC, censor in 307, and dictator in 312 and 302.
- Gaius Junius C. f. C. n. Brutus Bubulcus, consul in 291 and 277 BC, triumphed over the Lucani and Bruttii.
- Decimus Junius D. f. Brutus Scaeva, legate to the consul Spurius Carvilius Maximus in 293 BC, during the Third Samnite War. The following year, Brutus was consul, while Carvilius served as his legate. They defeated the Faliscans.
- Decimus Junius D. f. D. n. Brutus, with his brother, Marcus, exhibited the first gladiatorial combat at Rome in 264 BC.
- Marcus Junius D. f. D. n. Brutus, with his brother, Decimus, exhibited the first gladiatorial combat at Rome in 264 BC.
- Lucius Junius Brutus, grandfather of the consul of 178 BC.
- Marcus Junius (L. f.) Brutus, tribune of the plebs in 195 BC, he and Publius Brutus opposed the repeal of the lex Oppia, a sumptuary law. As praetor in 191, he dedicated the temple of the Magna Mater, and presided over the first celebration of the Megalesian Games at Rome. He was one of the ambassadors sent to Antiochus in 189.
- Publius Junius (L. f.) Brutus, tribune of the plebs in 195 BC, he and Marcus Brutus opposed the repeal of the lex Oppia. He was curule aedile in 192. Praetor in 190 BC, he obtained the province of Etruria, where he was subsequently propraetor. Afterward, the senate appointed him governor of Hispania Ulterior.
- Decimus Junius Brutus, one of the triumvirs for founding a colony in the territory of Sipontum, in 194 BC.
- Marcus Junius M. f. L. n. Brutus, consul in 178 BC, was probably the son of the Marcus Brutus who as praetor had dedicated the temple of the Magna Mater in 191, although they could possibly be the same person. In his consulship, he was sent against the Istri, whom he conquered in 177. In 171 he was sent as an ambassador to the allies in Asia Minor. He was a candidate for the censorship of 169.
- Marcus Junius M. f. M. n. Brutus, an eminent jurist of the second century BC.
- Marcus Junius M. f. M. n. Brutus, a jurist, described unfavorably by Cicero.
- Decimus Junius M. f. M. n. Brutus Callaicus, consul in 138 BC, was a partisan of the aristocratic party, and a fierce opponent of the tribunes of the plebs. After his year of office, he was assigned the province of Hispania Ulterior, where he subdued the Gallaeci and the Lusitani, and received a triumph.
- Junia M. f. M. n., the sister of Callaicus, died at an advanced age in 91 BC. Her funeral featured actors playing her male ancestors, an honour usually reserved for men.
- Junia D. f. M. n., daughter of Callaicus, and mother of Gaius Claudius Marcellus, consul in 50 BC.
- Decimus Junius D. f. M. n. Brutus, consul in 77 BC.
- Marcus Junius Brutus, an opponent of Sulla, committed suicide following the defeat in the civil war of 82 BC. He is probably identical to Brutus, praetor in 88 BC.
- Lucius Junius Brutus Damasippus, praetor in 82 BC, was a violent partisan of the younger Marius, at whose command he murdered senators of suspect loyalty in the war with Sulla.
- Junius L. f. Brutus Damasippus, presumably a son of Lucius Junius Brutus Damasippus, praetor in 82 BC, was adopted by one of the Licinii Crassi.
- Marcus Junius Brutus, tribune of the plebs in 83 BC, and father of the tyrannicide, was put to death in 77 BC at Pompey's instigation.
- Marcus Junius M. f. Brutus, the tyrannicide. He was adopted by his uncle, Quintus Servilius Caepio, and thereafter known as Quintus Servilius Caepio Brutus.
- Decimus Junius D. f. D. n. Brutus Albinus, one of the leading instigators of Caesar's assassination. He obtained his surname from his adoption by one of the Postumii.

=== Junii Perae ===
- Decimus Junius D. f. D. n. Pera, consul in 266 BC, and censor in 253, triumphed over the Sassinates, and a second time over the Sallentini and Messapii.
- Marcus Junius D. f. D. n. Pera, consul in 230 and censor in 225 BC, nominated dictator in 216 BC, after the Battle of Cannae.

=== Junii Penni ===
- Marcus Junius M. f. Pennus, praetor urbanus in 201 BC.
- Marcus Junius M. f. M. n. Pennus, praetor in 172 BC, was assigned to Hither Spain; he was consul in 167.
- Marcus Junius M. f. M. n. Pennus, tribune of the plebs in 126 BC. He passed a law preventing non-Roman citizens from settling in Roman cities (the Lex Junia de Peregrinis), which was opposed by Gaius Gracchus. He died in 123 while being aedile.

=== Junii Silani ===
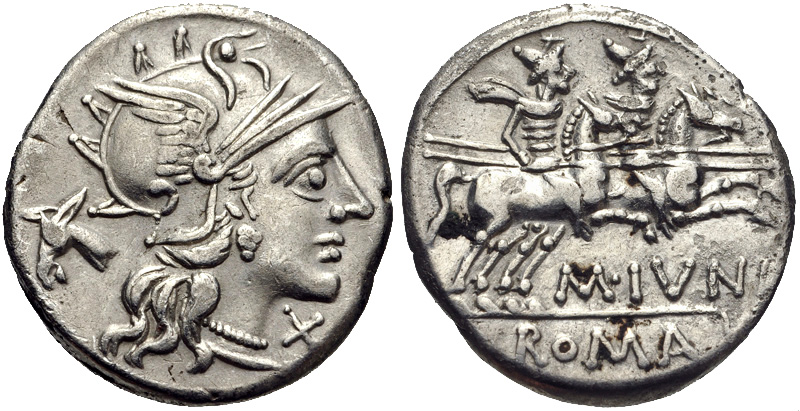
Denarius of Marcus Junius Silanus, 145 BC. The obverse depicts Roma in front of a donkey's head, alluding to Silenus. The Dioscuri appear on the reverse.

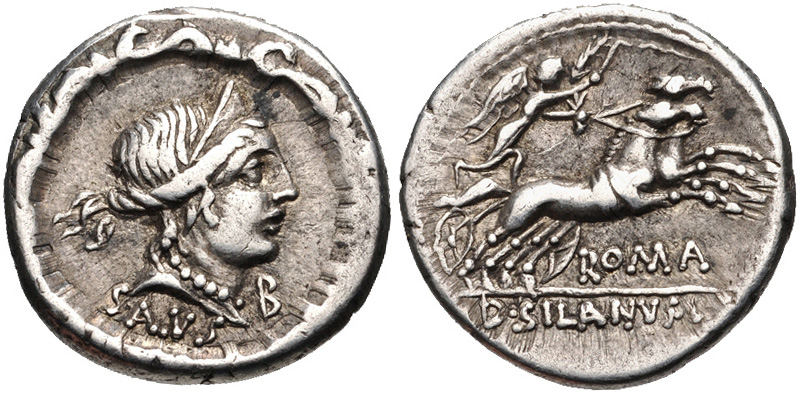
Denarius of Decimus Junius Silanus, 91 BC. The obverse depicts the head of Salus within a torque, alluding to the temple of Salus built by Gaius Junius Bubulcus Brutus in 307 BC. On the reverse, Victoria drives a biga.

- Marcus Junius Silanus, prefect in Naples in 216 BC; praetor, then propraetor, in Etruria from 212 to 211, and propraetor in Spain between 210 and 206.
- Marcus Junius M. f. Silanus, prefect of the allies, fell in battle against the Boii in 196 BC.
- Decimus Junius M. f. M. n. Silanus, a senator commissioned by the senate circa 146 BC to translate the agricultural writings of Mago into Latin.
- Marcus Junius D. f. M. n. Silanus, triumvir monetalis in 145 BC. He was probably the tribune of the plebs who carried a lex Junia de repetundis of uncertain date. (Note: Crawford assumes that he was the younger brother of Decimus, the translator of Mago, but Eilers disagrees, concluding that Decimus was probably much older than the moneyer, nor could Marcus have been the son of Decimus, who was probably childless, hence his adoption of one of the Manlii Torquati. Both Crawford and Eilers suggest that Marcus was the author of the lex Junia de repetundis passed between 149 and 123, although according to Broughton it was passed by the Marcus Junius Silanus who was consul in 109.)
- Decimus Junius D. f. M. n. Silanus Manlianus, the natural son of Titus Manlius Torquatus (consul in 165 BC), was adopted by Decimus Junius Silanus. He was praetor in 141, and obtained Macedonia as his province, where he received bribes. His natural father organised a private court in his house to judge him; banished from his father's house, Manlianus committed suicide soon after.
- Marcus Junius M. f. D. n. Silanus, triumvir monetalis in 116 or 115 BC, then praetor in Asia circa 102. (Note: Crawford was unsure about this moneyer, saying that he could have also been the Consul of 109 BC, but Eilers demonstrates that Crawford's initial suggestion was correct, and that they were two different persons.)
- Marcus Junius D. f. D. n. Silanus, praetor in 113 or 112 BC, and consul in 109. He was defeated by the Cimbri while consul or proconsul in Gaul in 109 or 108.
- Decimus Junius L. f. D. n. Silanus, triumvir monetalis in 91 BC.
- Marcus Junius D. f. D. n. Silanus, praetor in 77, and proconsul in Asia in 76. (Note: Broughton confuses the beginning of his career, as quaestor and proquaestor in Asia, with that of Marcus Junius Silanus, praetor circa 102.)
- Decimus Junius M. f. Silanus, aedile by 70 BC, praetor circa 67, and consul in 62. He was the stepfather of Marcus Junius Brutus, the tyrannicide. (Note: It is uncertain whether he is the son of the Marcus Junius Silanus who was consul in 109 BC, or the one who was praetor about 102.)
- Marcus Junius Silanus, legate in 53 BC under Caesar in Gaul.
- Marcus Junius D. f. M. n. Silanus, consul in 25 BC. He may be the same man as the legate under Lepidus and Mark Antony in 43 BC, the proquaestor under Antony from 34 to 33 BC, and moneyer in 33 indicating that he was also an augur.
- Lucius Junius M. f. D. n. Silanus, perhaps an augur before 31 BC, was praetor circa 24, and an unsuccessful candidate for the consulship in 21.
- Junia D. f. M. n., married Publius Servilius Isauricus
- Junia D. f. M. n., married Marcus Aemilius Lepidus, the triumvir.
- Junia D. f. M. n. Tertia, married Gaius Cassius Longinus, the tyrannicide.
- Gaius Junius C. f. Silanus, consul in 17 BC.
- Marcus Junius M. f. D. n. Silanus, son of the Marcus Junius Silanus who was consul in 25 BC, and the father of Marcus Junius Silanus Torquatus, consul in AD 19.
- Gaius Junius M. f. (D. n.) Silanus, the father of Gaius Junius Silanus, consul in AD 10, and Marcus Junius Silanus, consul in AD 15.
- Gaius Junius C. f. M. n. Silanus, consul in AD 10, and Flamen Martialis.
- Marcus Junius C. f. M. n. Silanus, consul suffectus in AD 15.
- Decimus Junius C. f. M. n. Silanus, exiled in AD 8 for his affair with Julia, the granddaughter of Augustus.
- Junia C. f. M. n. Torquata, a Vestal Virgin, interceded on behalf of her brother, Gaius Junius Silanus, the consul of AD 10, after he was condemned for treason in AD 22.
- Marcus Junius M. f. M. n. Silanus Torquatus, consul in AD 19.
- Lucius Junius D. f. Silanus, consul suffectus in AD 26.
- Gaius Appius Junius Silanus, consul in AD 28, put to death by the emperor Claudius in 41.
- Junia M. f. M. n. Calvina, the daughter of Marcus Junius Silanus Torquatus, consul in AD 19, married Lucius Vitellius.
- Junia M. f. M. n. Lepida, the sister of Calvina, married Gaius Cassius Longinus, consul suffectus in AD 30.
- Decimus Junius Silanus Gaetulicus, a son of Gnaeus Cornelius Lentulus Gaetulicus, the consul of AD 26.
- Junia M. f. M. n. Claudilla, wife of the emperor Caligula.
- Marcus Junius M. f. M. n. Silanus Torquatus, consul in AD 46, and later poisoned by Agrippina.
- Lucius Junius M. f. M. n. Silanus Torquatus, praetor in AD 48.
- Junia M. f. M. n. Silana, the wife of Gaius Silius.
- Decimus Junius M. f. M. n. Silanus Torquatus, consul in AD 53.
- Marcus Junius Silanus, consul suffectus in AD 54 or 55.
- Lucius Junius M. f. M. n. Torquatus Silanus, put to death by the emperor Nero in AD 65.
- Junius Silanus, perhaps consul suffectus in AD 189; his nomen is not complete in surviving inscriptions, and may instead be Julius.
- Junius Silanus, consul suffectus in AD 237, read before the senate the letter of Gordian I, in which he accepted the empire. He should perhaps be Julius Silanus, the name by which he is called in the Historia Augusta.

=== Junii Blaesi ===
- Junius Blaesus, the maternal grandfather of Sejanus.
- Quintus Junius Blaesus, consul suffectus in AD 10. Governor of Africa from 21 to 23, he triumphed over Tacfarinas. When his nephew, Sejanus, was arrested and put to death for treason in AD 31, and Blaesus was accused of complicity, he chose to end his life rather than face execution.
- Junia Blaesa, the mother of Sejanus.
- Quintus Junius Q. f. Blaesus, consul suffectus in AD 26. He and his brother, also of consular rank, took their own lives in AD 36, after Tiberius designated others for the priesthoods that had been promised to the Junii Blaesi.
- Lucius Junius Q. f. Blaesus, served under his father during the war against Tacfarinas. He was consul suffectus in AD 28, and put an end to himself in AD 36, as he felt himself disgraced by Tiberius.
- Junius Blaesus, governor of Gallia Lugdunensis in AD 69, was a supporter of the emperor Vitellius, who nonetheless had Blaesus poisoned because he had boasted about his descent from Mark Antony.

=== Junii Rustici ===
- Junius Rusticus, appointed to draw up the acta of the senate in AD 29, during the reign of Tiberius.
- Quintus Junius Arulenus Rusticus, consul suffectus in AD 92, a pupil of Publius Clodius Thrasea Paetus, put to death by Domitian.
- Junius Mauricus, brother of Arulenus Rusticus, and friend of the younger Pliny.
- Quintus Junius (L. f.) Rusticus, consul in AD 119 with the emperor Hadrian, is probably the consul Junius mentioned by Juvenal.
- Quintus Junius (Q. f. L. n.) Rusticus, consul suffectus in AD 133, and consul in AD 162.

=== Others ===
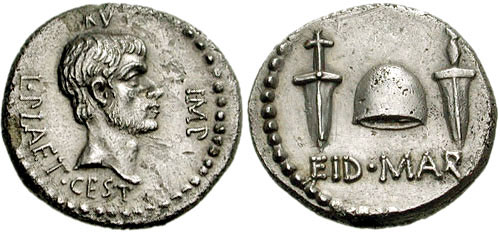
Denarius of Marcus Junius Brutus, depicted on the obverse. The reverse depicts a pileus between two daggers, with the legend "EID MAR" (Ides of March), commemorating the assassination of Caesar.

- Quintus Junius, tribune of the plebs in 439 BC, endeavored to excite the people against the murderers of Spurius Maelius.
- Lucius Junius C. f. L. n. Pullus, consul in 249 BC during the First Punic War.
- Decimus Junius, stationed with a force at the mouth of the Volturnus by the consul Appius Claudius Pulcher, in 212 BC, during the Second Punic War.
- Gaius Junius C. f., triumvir monetalis in 149 BC.
- Marcus Junius Gracchanus, sometimes emended to M. Junius Congus Gracchanus, a noteworthy legal historian and scholar of the Roman constitution and magistracies. He was perhaps tribune of the plebs in 123 and author of a law that amended the lex Calpurnia. As his nickname implies, he was a supporter of Gaius Gracchus.
- Titus Junius L. f., a skilled orator in the time of Sulla, obtained the condemnation of Publius Sextius, praetor designatus, for bribery at the elections.
- Marcus Junius, the previous defender of Publius Quinctius, whose defense was subsequently assumed by Cicero.
- Gaius Junius, one of the judges in the case against Oppianicus, accused of corruption and compelled to retire from public life.
- Gaius Junius C. f., son of the Judge in the case against Oppianicus.
- Marcus Junius, a praetor, before whom Cicero defended Decimus Matrinius.
- Junius Saturninus, a historian during the time of Augustus, quoted by Suetonius.
- Junius Otho, a rhetorician, and praetor in AD 22.
- Junius Otho, tribune of the plebs in AD 37, banished by Tiberius for interceding in the question of the reward that was to be given to the accuser of Acutia, the wife of Publius Vitellius.
- Lucius Junius Moderatus, surnamed Columella, an important historical writer, author of De Re Rustica.
- Lucius Junius Gallio, a rhetorician and friend of the elder Seneca, whose son he adopted. He was expelled from Italy because Tiberius suspected he was associated with Sejanus. He may have been related to Sejanus' uncle, Quintus Junius Blaesus, or perhaps even his brother.
- Lucius Junius Gallio Annaeanus, son of the elder Seneca, adopted by the rhetorician Lucius Junius Gallio.
- Lucius Junius Maro Aemilius Paternus, an eminent citizen of Lancia, probably related to the two Junii Blaesi who lost their priesthoods.
- Junius Cilo, procurator of Bithynia et Pontus during the reign of Claudius, brought Mithridates of Bosporus to Rome.
- Junius Maximus, a contemporary of the poet Statius, from whom we learn that he made an epitome of the histories of Sallust and Livy.
- Titus Junius Montanus, consul Ex Kal. Mai. in AD 81.
- Decimus Junius Juvenalis, a poet of the late first and early second centuries.
- Kanus Junius Niger, consular legate in Germania Superior, AD 116; he may have been consul the previous year.
- Kanus Junius (Kani f.) Niger, consul in AD 138.
- Junius Mauricianus, a jurist in the time of Antoninus Pius.
- Aulus Junius Rufinus, consul in AD 153.
- Marcus Junius Rufinus Sabinianus, consul in AD 155.
- Gaius Junius Faustinus Postumianus, governor of Britannia Superior during the first half of the third century.
- Gaius Junius Donatus, consul in AD 260.
- Marcus Junius Maximus, consul in AD 282.
- Junius Quartus Palladius, consul in AD 416.
- Junius Philargyrius, an early commentator on Publius Vergilius Maro.

Brutus family tree

Salonia (2)	Cato the Elder	Licinia (1)
Marcus Porcius Cato Salonianus	Marcus Porcius Cato Licinianus	Marcus Livius Drusus
Marcus Porcius Cato (2)	Livia	Quintus Servilius Caepio (1)	Marcus Livius Drusus
Atilia (1)	Cato the Younger	Marcus Livius Drusus Claudianus, adopted son
Marcus Junius Brutus (1)	Servilia, mistress of Julius Caesar (see AUGUSTUS below)	Decimus Junius Silanus (2)	Servilia	Gnaeus Servilius Caepio	Lucius Appuleius SATURNINUS
Marcus Porcius Cato	Porcia	Marcus Junius Brutus†	Junia Prima	Junia Tertia	Gaius Cassius Longinus x	Marcus Aemilius Lepidus (consul 78 BC)	Appuleia, daughter of SATURNINUS
Junia Secunda	Marcus Aemilius Lepidus (triumvir)	Lucius Aemilius Paullus (consul 50 BC)
Descendant of POMPEY MAGNUS and Lucius Cornelius SULLA	son (perhaps Quintus Aemilius Lepdius?)	Marcus Aemilius Lepidus Minor (the Younger)	Servilia Isaurica, daughter of Junia Prima (see above) and Publius Servilius Isauricus	Emperor AUGUSTUS (possibly, see JULIO-CLAUDIANS for descendants)	Paullus Aemilius Lepidus	Cornelia, daughter of Gnaeus Cornelius Lentulus Marcellinus and Scribonia, wife of AUGUSTUS and mother of Julia the Elder
Manius Aemilius Lepidus	Aemilia Lepida II (also engaged to Lucius Caesar, see JULIO-CLAUDIANS and AUGUSTUS)	Publius Sulpicius Quirinius (of the Sulpicia gens, related to GALBA below)	Lucius Aemilius Paullus (consul 1)	Julia the Younger, daughter of Julia the Elder and Marcus Vispanius Agrippa, see AUGUSTUS and Cornelia above	Marcus Aemilius Lepidus (consul 6 AD)
daughter (perhaps known as Aemilia Lepida?)
Aemilia Lepida	Servius Sulpicius GALBA	Mamercus Aemilius Scaurus (of the Aemilia gens, related to the Lepidae)	Marcus Junius Silanus Torquatus (of the Junia gens, related to BRUTUS, see above)	Aemilia Lepida	CLAUDIUS (see AUGUSTUS above and JULIO-CLAUDIANS)	Lucius Vitellius (consul 34)	Livilla, daughter of Drusus the Elder and sister of Germanicus and CLAUDIUS, aunt of Drusus Caesar (see JULIO-CLAUDIANS and to the right)	Lucius Aelius Sejanus, the almost emperor	Aemilia Lepida	Drusus Caesar, son of Agrippina the Elder, daughter of Julia the Elder (see AUGUSTUS and Julia the Younger above and see JULIO-CLAUDIANS)
Gaius Cassius Longinus (descended from or related to GAIUS CASSIUS LONGINUS, see above)	Junia Lepida	Junia Calvina	Lucius Vitellius (consul 48)	Aulus VITELLIUS (for Otho's relation, in terms of the Year of the Four Emperors, he married Poppaea Sabina, who married NERO, see AUGUSTUS and CLAUDIUS above)
Cassia Longina	Gnaeus Domitius Corbulo, brother of Milona, wife of CALIGULA, see JULIO-CLAUDIANS and see above
Lucius Aelius Lamia Plautius Aelianus	Domitia Longina	Domitian, see FLAVIANS and VESPASIAN
Plautia (possibly existed, although unsure, but if so, then her brother is Lucius Fundanius Lamia Aelianus, father of Lucius Plautius Lamia Silvanus, alleged ancestor of Fabia Orestilla, wife of Gordian I, see GORDIANS)	Lucius Ceionius Commodus
Lucius Aelius Caesar	Marcus Aurelius (see NERVA-ANTONINES)
Lucius Verus (for further relations, see NERVA-ANTONINES)	Lucilla

(1): 1st spouse
(2): 2nd spouse
†: assassin of Caesar

== See also ==
- List of Roman gentes
