= Aemilia Lepida (fiancee of Claudius) =

Noble Roman woman (5 BC - c. 43 AD)

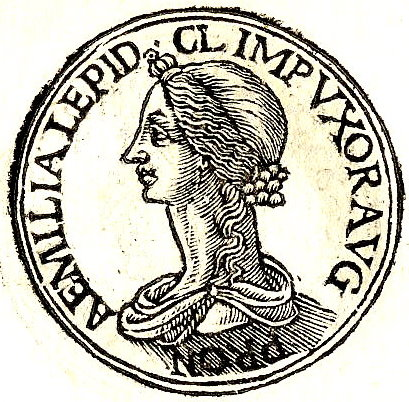
- Aemilia Lepida from the Promptuarium Iconum Insigniorum
- Born: 5 BC
- Died: c. 43 AD
- Noble family: Julio-Claudian (maternal) Aemilia (paternal)
- Spouse: Marcus Junius Silanus Torquatus
- Issue: Marcus Junius Silanus; Junia Calvina; Decimus Junius Silanus Torquatus; Lucius Junius Silanus Torquatus; Junia Lepida
- Father: Lucius Aemilius Paullus
- Mother: Julia the Younger

Aemilia Lepida (5 BC – c. 43 AD) was a noble Roman woman and matron. She was the first great-grandchild of the Emperor Augustus.

== Biography ==
=== Early life ===
She was the first great-grandchild of Emperor Augustus and the noblewoman Scribonia, being the firstborn child of Julia the Younger, who was the eldest daughter of Julia the Elder, Augustus' only child. Her father was Lucius Aemilius Paullus, who was the son of Paullus Aemilius Lepidus, and grandson of Lucius Aemilius Lepidus Paullus, and therefore a great-nephew of the triumvir Lepidus, and of a distinguished and ancient patrician family, the Aemilii Lepidi.

She may possibly have a brother named Marcus Aemilius Lepidus (6-39) who was married to Caligula's favorite sister Julia Drusilla.

=== Marriage ===
In her younger years, Lepida was betrothed to Claudius, but her parents fell out of favour with Augustus so the emperor broke off the engagement. In AD 8, her mother Julia the Younger (otherwise called Vipsania Julia) was exiled for adultery, like her own mother Julia. Her father Lucius was executed in 14 for participating in a conspiracy against Augustus.

By AD 13, Lepida had married Marcus Junius Silanus Torquatus, a member of the patrician branch of the ancient gens Junia. Their children were:

- Marcus Junius Silanus (AD 14–54), consul in 46, put to death in order to ensure the succession of Nero, and to prevent him from avenging the death of his brother, Lucius.
- Junia Calvina (fl. AD 79), married Lucius Vitellius, a brother of the future emperor Vitellius. Accused of incest with her youngest brother, she was exiled by Claudius, only to be recalled ten years later by the emperor Nero.
- Decimus Junius Silanus Torquatus (d. AD 64), consul in 53, forced by Nero to commit suicide after being accused of boasting of his descent from Augustus.
- Lucius Junius Silanus Torquatus (d. AD 49), praetor in 48, he was engaged to Octavia, daughter of Claudius. Agrippina spread a rumour that he had committed incest with his sister, as a result of which he was expelled from the Senate and deprived of his office. He committed suicide on the day that Claudius and Agrippina were married.
- Junia Lepida, who married Gaius Cassius Longinus, and raised her nephew Lucius Junius Silanus Torquatus the younger (50-66) after his father, Marcus, was murdered. Junia Lepida was the grandmother of Empress Domitia Longina

The time of her death is not known. She is sometimes said to have been poisoned on the orders of Agrippina the Younger during the reign of Nero, but this Lepida was evidently Domitia Lepida Minor, the mother of Valeria Messalina and the second wife of Appius Junius Silanus.

== Sources ==
- Gaius Suetonius Tranquillus, De Vita Caesarum, Claudius, 26.
- Publius Cornelius Tacitus, Annales.
