= Marcus Junius Silanus =

Marcus Junius Silanus may refer to:

- Marcus Junius Silanus (consul 109 BC)
- Marcus Junius Silanus (consul 25 BC)
- Marcus Junius Silanus (consul 15)
- Marcus Junius Silanus (consul 46)
- Marcus Junius Silanus (praetor 212 BC)
- Marcus Junius Silanus Torquatus
