= Lucius Junius Silanus Torquatus =

Two 1st century Roman noblemen

Two noblemen, an uncle and nephew, who shared the name Lucius Junius Silanus Torquatus and were descendants of the Roman Emperor Augustus, lived during the 1st century AD.

== Elder Silanus ==
Silanus (died 49), was the third born son to Aemilia Lepida and Marcus Junius Silanus Torquatus, a member of the Junii Silani, a family of Ancient Rome. His maternal grandparents were Julia the Younger, granddaughter of Augustus, and consul Lucius Aemilius Paullus. Through his maternal grandparents he was a descendant of the Roman Emperor Augustus, the noble woman Scribonia, the statesman Marcus Vipsanius Agrippa and the consul Lucius Aemilius Lepidus Paullus (brother of the triumvir Marcus Aemilius Lepidus). He won an honorary triumph and gave a lavish gladiatorial display. He was praetor in 48. The Emperor Claudius betrothed him to his daughter Claudia Octavia, but this was broken off (also in 48) when the Empress Agrippina the Younger, hoping to secure Octavia as bride for her son Nero and also to eliminate a potential threat to Nero's prospects, falsely charged him with open affection toward his sister Junia Calvina. This was carried out through the agency of Lucius Vitellius, who was Junia's husband. Consequently, Claudius broke off the engagement and forced Silanus to resign from public office. He was forced to commit suicide on New Year's Day, 49, the same day that Claudius and Agrippina married.

== Younger Silanus ==
Silanus (50-66) was the son of the elder's brother, Marcus. His mother is unknown. After his father's murder, he was raised by his paternal aunt Junia Lepida and her husband Gaius Cassius Longinus. A respected young nobleman, he became a rival in his youth to Emperor Nero. Expelled from public life by Nero after his accession to the purple, Silanus was banished to the small country town of Bari (Roman Barium in Apulia). Ordered to commit suicide, he chose to fight, and was killed in a standoff with his guards.

== See also ==
- Junia (gens)

== Sources ==
- Suetonius - De Vita Caesarum
- Tacitus - Annales
