= Silanus =

Silanus may refer to:

- Silanus, Sardinia, a town in Sardinia
- Silanus of Ambracia (fl. 5th century BC), Greek soothsayer
- Gaius Julius Silanus, Roman senator
- Junius Silanus (disambiguation), Romans
