= Junia Lepida =

Roman noblewoman

- Born: c. 18 AD
- Died: 65 AD
- Noble family: Junii Silani
- Spouse: Gaius Cassius Longinus
- Issue: Cassia Longina; Cassius Lepidus
- Father: Marcus Junius Silanus Torquatus
- Mother: Aemilia Lepida

Junia Lepida (c. AD 18 - 65) was a Roman noblewoman who lived in the first century.

== Life ==
She was the second daughter of Aemilia Lepida and Marcus Junius Silanus Torquatus, one of the Junii Silani. Her maternal grandparents were Julia the Younger, granddaughter of the emperor Augustus, and Lucius Aemilius Paullus, consul in AD 1.

Lepida married Gaius Cassius Longinus (c. 13 BC - AD 69), a person with remarkable ancestral wealth. Cassius was praefectus urbi circa AD 27, consul suffectus in AD 30, proconsul of Asia in 40 or 41, and governor of Syria between about AD 45 and 49. Lepida and Cassius raised Lepida's nephew, Lucius Junius Silanus Torquatus, whose father was murdered by Empress Agrippina the Younger. In AD 66, Lepida's husband and nephew were expelled from Rome by Emperor Nero for being a part in Gaius Calpurnius Piso's conspiracy. Cassius was deported to Sardinia. Lepida was accused by Nero of black magic and incest with her nephew; her subsequent fate is unknown. Cassius was later rehabilitated, and recalled from exile by Vespasian.

Lepida bore Longinus two children: Cassia Longina (born c. AD 35), who married the Roman general Gnaeus Domitius Corbulo, and Cassius Lepidus (born c. AD 55). The latter had a daughter, Cassia Lepida (born c. AD 80), who married Gaius Julius Alexander Berenicianus (born c. AD 80), consul in AD 116, and proconsul of Asia in AD 132, and had a daughter, Julia Cassia Alexandra, mother of Avidius Cassius.

== Sources ==
- Edmund Groag, Arthur Stein, Leiva Petersen, et alia (edd.), Prosopographia Imperii Romani, Berlin, 1933 - 2016. (PIR^{2} I 861)
