= Marcus Junius Gracchanus =

Roman legal historian (2nd–1st century BC)

Marcus Junius Gracchanus (2nd–1st century BC) was a Roman legal historian who was a partisan of the Brothers Gracchi and their reforms. He was the founder of the Junii Gracchani, a branch of the prominent Junia family.

== Name ==
Marcus was a common given name (praenomen) within the Junia family. He assumed his epithet (agnomen) "the Gracchan" or "Gracchian" (Gracchanus) out of solidarity with Gaius Sempronius Gracchus and his reforms. His name is sometimes emended to M. Junius Congus Gracchanus and sometimes mistakenly given as "Gaius Junius Gracchanus", "Junius Gracchianus", or as "Junius Gracchus".

== Life ==
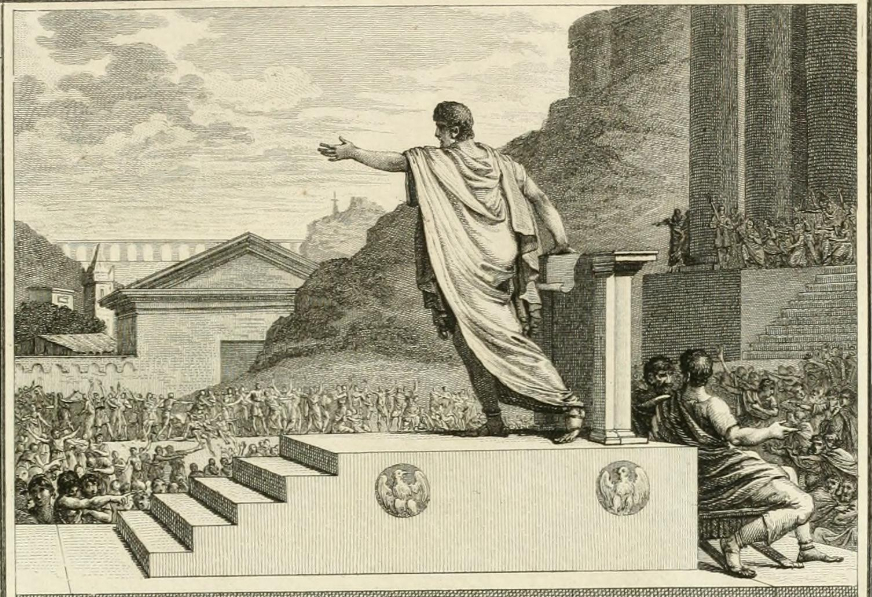
Mirys's Gaius Gracchus, Tribune of the People (1799)

Little is known of the life of Gracchanus. He was born into the prominent plebeian Junia family and was a partisan of the populares and the Gracchian reforms. He apparently belonged to a fraternity (sodalitas) with Titus Pomponius, the father of Cicero's friend T. Pomponius Atticus.

A tribune of the plebs for 123 BC named Marcus Junius son of Decimus ("M. Iunius f. D. tr. pl.") was responsible for the Lex Junia that amended the Lex Calpurnia, changing court procedures and jury composition to make it easier for provincial subjects to recover property illegally seized by governors and other Roman officials. This is usually taken to have been M. Junius Silanus who was an optimate consul in 109 BC, but Boris Rankov suggests it may have been the Gracchian ally Marcus Junius instead. Similarly, if Gracchanus were identical to the separately attested Junius Congus and had the cognomen Gracchanus assigned to him by others, then—as Rankov argues—he would have gone from a notoriously middle-brow moderate ally of the Gracchi brothers to a learned antiquarian in retirement, whether out of disillusion or an abundance of caution after having been exempted from the purge of the Gracchi's closest supporters in 121 BC and after. His father would have been named Decimus Junius Congus and the son would've been remarkably long lived, the historian Junius Congus being mentioned as only recently dead in 54 BC. Rankov's arguments, however, depend on Silanus not having made a similar political adjustment to the one he proposes for Congus, effusively praised by the optimate orator Marcus Antonius, and on it being unlikely that the large and prominent Junia family would have two scholars in the same generation.

== Works ==
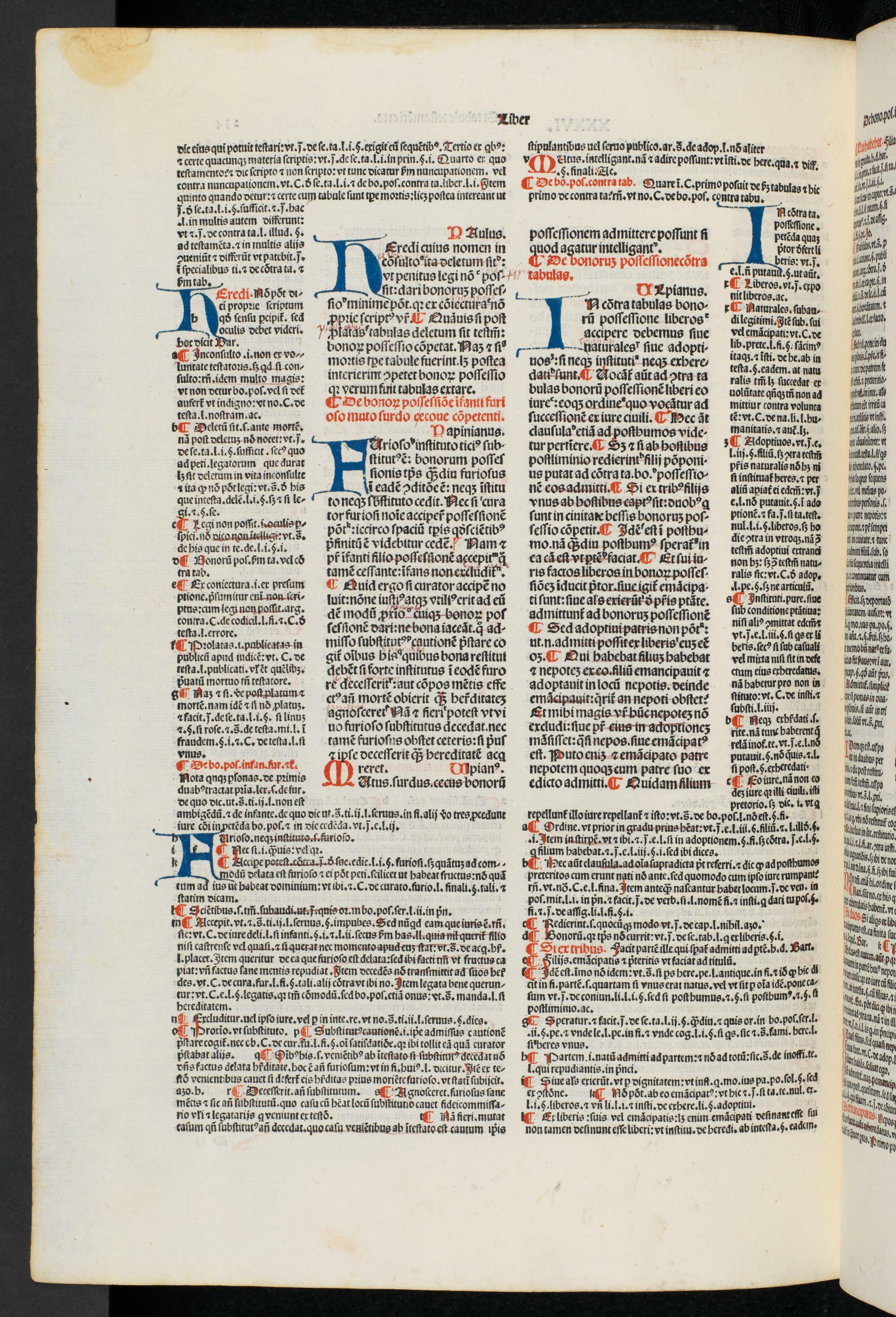
Battista Torti's early Renaissance copy of Justinian's Digest (1495), preserving parts of Gracchanus's De Potestatibus

Gracchanus wrote a work "On Legal Powers" (De Potestatibus) that survives only in descriptions and fragments. It recounted Rome's unwritten constitution and various offices from the legendary time of kings, discussing the origin of new offices and when changes were made to the various offices' duties. It was dedicated to Titus Pomponius. It is quoted or excerpted by Censorinus, Macrobius, Pliny, Ulpian, and Varro. Parts of Gaius's On the Law of the 12 Tables and Pomponius's Enchiridion excerpted in Justinian's Digest also seem to be based on Gracchanus's text. Hans Beck considers that the optimate politician and historian Gaius Sempronius Tuditanus's "Of Magistrates" (Magistratuum Libri) was intended as a direct response to Gracchanus's arguments, whereas Rankov considers Gracchanus's work a possible reposte to Tuditanus instead.
