= Triaria =

Roman noblewoman

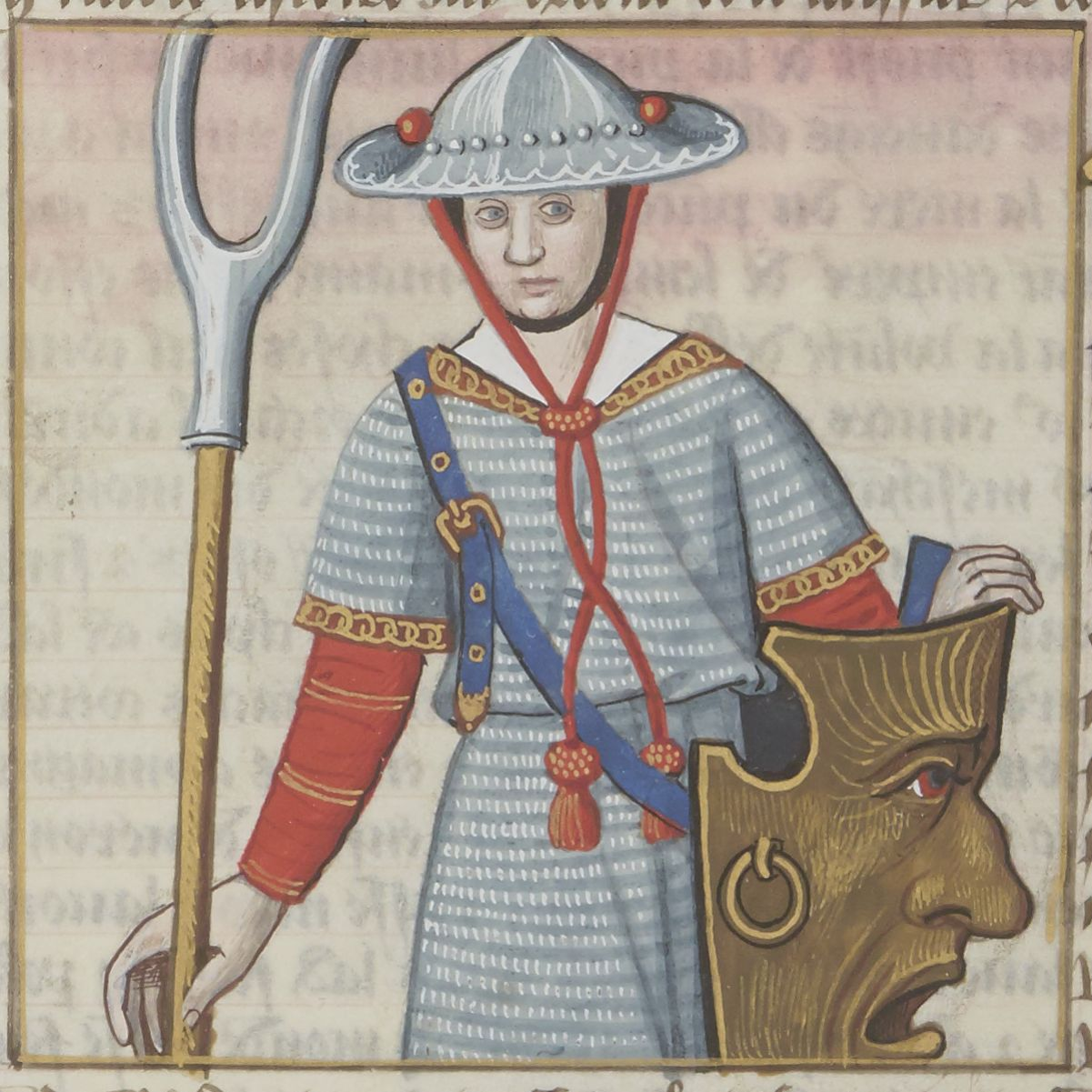
In On Famous Women

Triaria (1st-century) was a Roman woman, the second wife of Lucius Vitellius the Younger (the brother of emperor Vitellius).

She is mentioned on the funeral monument of her favourite slavewoman, Tyrannis, in Tibur:

According to Tacitus, when former praetor Marcus Plancius Varus accused one Gnaeus Cornelius Dolabella of treason, Triaria responded by intimidating the City Prefect, Titus Flavius Sabinus, warning him not to seek a reputation for clemency by endangering the newly-enthroned Vitellius.

She was accused of wearing a soldier's sword and behaving with insolent cruelty after the capture of the town of Tarracina.

In On Famous Women, Boccaccio praised Triaria for her bravery. An early French manuscript of this work contains a plate f. 63v (captioned "Miniature showing a bloody slaughter inside a walled city, with Triaria prominent among the wounded warriors.") which may refer to the sack of Tarracina. Christine de Pizan's The Book of the City of Ladies (early 15th century) discusses Triaria as well.

== See also ==
- Triaria gens

== Primary sources ==
- Gaius Cornelius Tacitus Historiae ii.63, iii.76-77
- Continuité gentilice et continuité sénatoriale dans les familles sénatoriales romaines à l'époque impériale, 2000
