= Decimus Junius Silanus Torquatus =

1st century Roman senator, consul AD 53

Decimus Junius Silanus Torquatus (c. 16 AD – 64 AD) was a Roman senator who lived during the 1st century.

== Life ==
He served as an ordinary consul in 53 with Quintus Haterius Antoninus as his colleague. Decimus was the second son born to Aemilia Lepida and Marcus Junius Silanus Torquatus, a member of the Junii Silani, a family of Ancient Rome.

Through his maternal grandparents, the princess Julia the Younger and Lucius Aemilius Paullus, consul AD 1, Decimus was related to Emperor Augustus, his second wife, Scribonia, the statesman Marcus Vipsanius Agrippa and the consul Lucius Aemilius Lepidus Paullus (brother of the triumvir Marcus Aemilius Lepidus).

Decimus married Julia Africana in 54 AD. Julia was the daughter of the consul Marcus Julius Africanus. They had one daughter named Junia Silana Torquata (b. 55).

Decimus allegedly boasted of his descent from Augustus, and as a result, Emperor Nero forced him to commit suicide.

== See also ==
- Junia (gens)

Political offices
Preceded by Faustus Cornelius Sulla Felix, and Lucius Salvidienus Rufus Salvianus	Consul of the Roman Empire; 53 with Quintus Haterius Antoninus	Succeeded by Publius Trebonius, and Quintus Caecina Primus
