= Junia Calvina =

Roman noblewoman in the first century AD

- Noble family: Aemilia (maternal); Junia (paternal)
- Spouses: Gaius Sallustius Passienus Crispus (possibly); Lucius Vitellius
- Issue: Sallustia Calvina (possibly)
- Father: Marcus Junius Silanus Torquatus]
- Mother: Aemilia Lepida

Junia Calvina was a Roman noblewoman who lived in the 1st century AD.

== Biography ==
The daughter of Aemilia Lepida and Marcus Junius Silanus Torquatus, consul in 19, Calvina belonged to two patrician houses: the gens Aemilia and gens Junia respectively. She was also the great-great-granddaughter of the Roman emperor Caesar Augustus on her mother's side of the Imperial family. As such, she was also related by blood to the gens Julia, the aristocratic family of the Roman dictator Julius Caesar. Tacitus calls Calvina "festivissima puella" and the Emperor Vespasian, in one of his jokes, mentions her as living in AD 79. Seneca describes her as "most celebrated of all women (she whom all called Venus)."

Calvina may have been married to Gaius Sallustius Passienus Crispus and had a daughter named Sallustia Calvina with him, this woman married Publius Ostorius Scapula.

Calvina was married to Lucius Vitellius, the brother of Aulus Vitellius, in the 1st century AD. Despite, or rather because of their blood relation to the first emperor of Rome, Calvina's close family was often persecuted by their kinsmen, particularly the lineal descendants of Livia Drusilla, Augustus' third wife and the first Roman empress. Calvina and Vitellius were divorced in AD 49 following allegations of incest with her younger brother, Lucius Junius Silanus Torquatus, who was forced to commit suicide shortly thereafter. In the same year, Calvina was exiled from Rome by Emperor Claudius, only to be recalled a decade later by his successor, Nero.

With Nero's suicide in AD 68, the Julio-Claudian dynasty collapsed and gave way to the Roman civil war known as the Year of the Four Emperors. By then Calvina was one of Augustus' few remaining descendants who survived the fall of Rome's first Imperial dynasty.
