= Villa of Nero =

Ancient Roman villa in Olympia, Greece

Coordinates: 37.6380°N 21.6323°E

Nero's House - Octagon

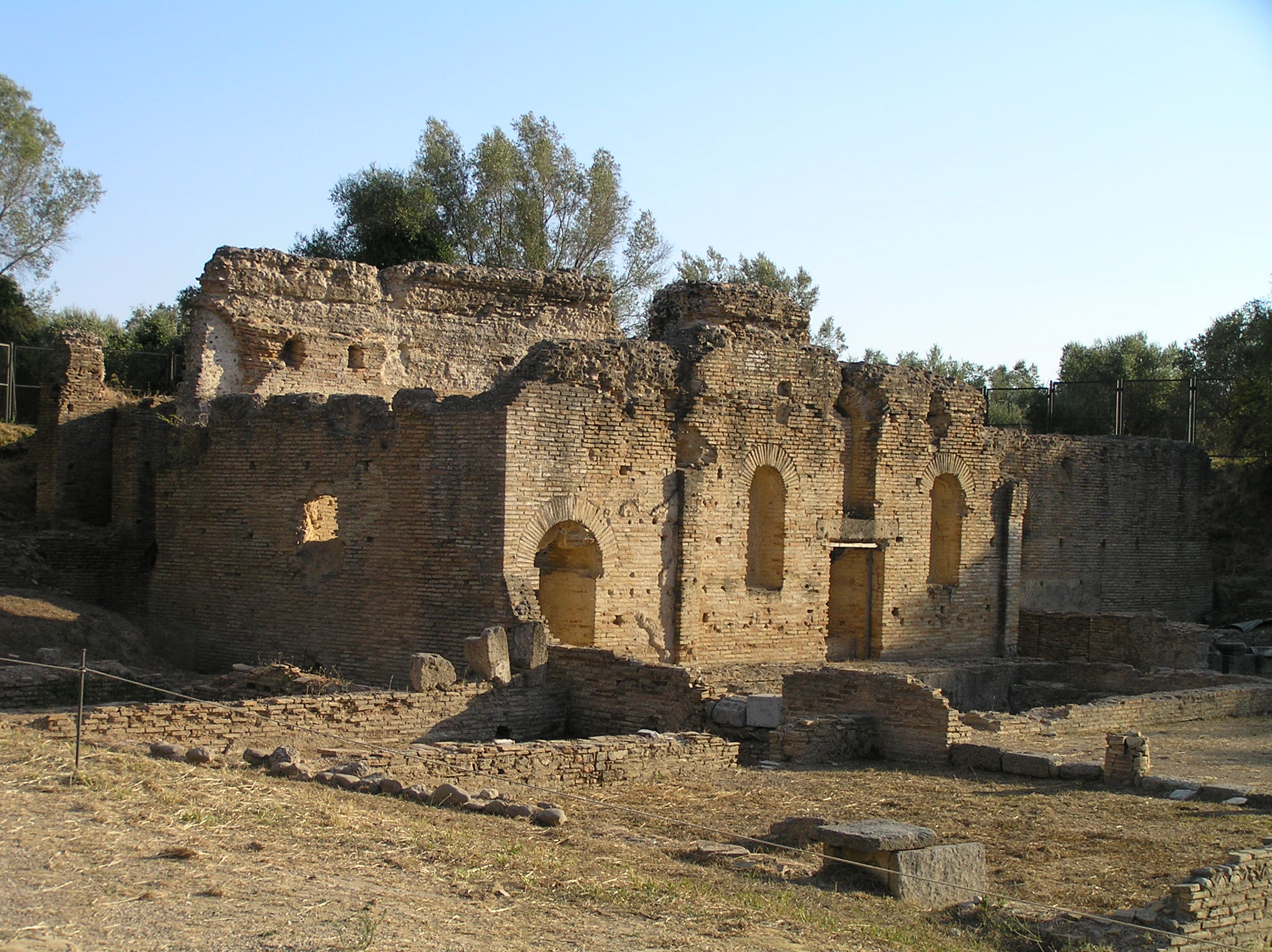
Villa of Nero, Olympia

The Villa of Nero at Olympia, Greece is one of the ancient Roman villas built for the Roman emperor Nero in the 1st century AD. It is located to the south-east of the ancient sanctuary. He had other villas were at Subiaco and Antium in Italy.

It is named after the brief residence there of Nero during his participation in the chariot race of the 211th Olympiad (67 AD). It had probably been a temple of Hestia of the 5th century BC, extended with the Stoa of Hestia (3rd century BC), and had burned down. Nero walled it off from the sacred precinct and built a luxurious villa in 65-67 AD. It included a large peristyle and gardens, with baths in its southern section. It was later used as a mansio or official guesthouse.

The current building is from the 3rd century AD when it was remodelled into the public Southeastern Baths, centred on the monumental Octagon vaulted room that served as the calidarium (hot room).

The villa extended into the bed of the river Alpheius.

Archaeological excavations reveal the presence of a lead water pipe bearing the inscription "ner. aug.", an abbreviation of the name Nero Augustus.

== See also ==
- Domus Aurea
