= Marcus Junius Silanus Torquatus =

Roman consul in 19 AD

Marcus Junius Silanus Torquatus was a Roman senator. He was consul in AD 19, with Lucius Norbanus Balbus as his colleague.

== Biography ==
Silanus was a descendant of the noble Roman house of the Junii Silani. His grandfather was Marcus Junius Silanus, consul with the emperor Augustus in 25 BC. His mother appears to have been Calpurnia Domitia Calvina, daughter of Lucius Calpurnius Bibulus and Domitia Calvina, daughter of Gnaeus Domitius Calvinus. Torquatus married Aemilia Lepida, daughter of Julia the Younger, and great-granddaughter of Augustus.

Consul for the whole year of AD 19, he and his colleague Norbanus brought forward the lex Junia Norbana, which prevented slaves manumitted by praetors from receiving the franchise, and precluding their descendants from inheritance. Freedmen under this law came to be known as Latini Juniani.

From AD 32 to 38, Silanus was proconsul of Africa.

== Descendants ==
Silanus and Aemilia had five children, all of whom suffered as a result of their connection to the imperial family.

- Marcus Junius Silanus (AD 14–54), consul in 46, put to death in order to ensure the succession of Nero, and to prevent him from avenging the death of his brother, Lucius.
- Junia Calvina (d. after AD 79), married Lucius Vitellius, a brother of the future emperor Vitellius. Accused of incest with her youngest brother, she was exiled by Claudius, only to be recalled ten years later by the emperor Nero.
- Decimus Junius Silanus Torquatus (d. AD 64), consul in 53, forced by Nero to commit suicide after being accused of boasting of his descent from Augustus.
- Lucius Junius Silanus Torquatus (d. AD 49), praetor in 48, he was engaged to Octavia, daughter of Claudius. Agrippina spread a rumor that he had committed incest with his sister, as a result of which he was expelled from the Senate and deprived of his office. He committed suicide on the day that Claudius and Agrippina were married.
- Junia Lepida, who married Gaius Cassius Longinus, and raised her nephew Lucius Junius Silanus Torquatus the younger (50–66), after his father Marcus was murdered.

== See also ==
- List of Roman consuls

Political offices
Preceded by Gaius Rubellius Blandus; Marcus Vipstanus Gallus as suffect consuls	Roman consul 19 with Lucius Norbanus Balbus, Publius Petronius	Succeeded by Marcus Valerius Messalla; Marcus Aurelius Cotta Maximus Messalinus as ordinary consuls
