= Lucius Aemilius Paullus (consul 1) =

Roman politician and consul in 1 AD

Lucius Aemilius Paullus (born before 29 BC – AD 14) was the son of Paullus Aemilius Lepidus (suffect consul 34 BC and later censor) and Cornelia, the elder daughter of Scribonia. He was married to Julia the Younger, the eldest granddaughter of the Emperor Augustus.

== Biography ==
He is first mentioned in the elegy of his mother Cornelia's death in the same year her brother became consul. This year has been argued to be 18 BC and 16 BC.

He was brought up by his father, Paullus Aemilius Lepidus. Sometime after 13 BC, this elder Paullus married Claudia Marcella Minor, who herself was a widow with a small child. The early career of the younger Paullus is unknown, his first and only known post being that of consul in 1 AD as the colleague of his brother-in-law, Gaius Caesar. He is also known to have been a member of the Arval Brethren.

According to ancient historians, his wife Julia was exiled in 8 AD for having an affair with a senator. Paullus himself was executed as a conspirator in a plot to assassinate Augustus at some point between 1 and 14.

He probably only had one child by his wife, a girl named Aemilia Lepida (4/3 BC – 53 AD), who was betrothed to Claudius until the downfall of her parents caused her great-grandfather, Augustus, to break off the betrothal and marry her to Marcus Junius Silanus Torquatus, consul in AD 19, by whom she had several children, including Junia Calvina and Marcus Junius Silanus, consul in AD 46. However, it is possible that he also had a son, Marcus Aemilius Lepidus, who was married to Caligula's favorite sister Julia Drusilla.

== Notes ==
Political offices
Preceded by Cossus Cornelius Lentulus; Lucius Calpurnius Piso	Roman consul AD 1 with Gaius Caesar	Succeeded by Marcus Herennius Picens as suffect
