= Lucius Vitellius (consul 48) =

1st century AD Roman senator and consul

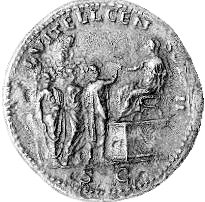
Coin showing Lucius Vitellius during his second censorship

Lucius Vitellius (10 AD – 22 December 69) was a Roman senator who lived in the 1st century. He was the second son of Lucius Vitellius and Sextilia, and younger brother of emperor Aulus Vitellius. Lucius was suffect consul in the nundinium of July-December 48 with Gaius Vipstanus Messalla Gallus as his colleague.

His first wife in 46 or 47 was Junia Calvina, a descendant of the Emperor Augustus, but they divorced before 49. The Empress Agrippina the Younger, hoping to secure Octavia as bride for her son Nero and also to eliminate a potential threat to Nero's prospects, falsely charged Junia's brother Lucius Junius Silanus Torquatus with open affection toward his sister Junia Calvina. This was carried out through the agency of Lucius Vitellius, who was Junia's husband.The second wife of Vitellius was Triaria. He had no issue from either of his marriages.

== Life ==
According to Suetonius, Lucius was the favorite of three emperors, thus winning "public offices and important priesthoods"; these public offices included curator of the public works. He was proconsul of Africa, where Suetonius writes he behaved with exceptional honesty for two years, acting part of the time in place of his brother. The emperors who favored him are most likely Claudius, Nero, and lastly his brother.

The best documented portion of his life was his last months, during the Year of Four Emperors. Suetonius records that he celebrated the entrance of his brother Aulus into Rome with a feast that included 2,000 choice fish and 7,000 game birds. Tacitus records that he denounced Junius Blaesus to his brother, who had just returned to Rome from his governorship of Gallia Lugdunensis: Caecina Tuscus had thrown a banquet in Blaesus' honor, and when his brother the emperor noticed the mansion lit up, he compelled his brother to have Blaesus killed, claiming he was courting both the army and the urban mob. The emperor Vitellius eliminated Blaesus by poisoning.

When troops supporting Vespasian entered Rome, Lucius was in Campania with six cohorts and 500 cavalry crushing an insurgency of Vespasian's supporters. He had occupied Feronia and had captured Tarracina through treachery when his brother surrendered. Lucius himself surrendered at Bovillae, and was treacherously executed after negotiating with his captors for his safety.

Political offices
Preceded by Aulus Vitellius, and Lucius Vipstanus Poplicola	Suffect Consul of the Roman Empire; AD 48 with Gaius Vipstanus Messalla Gallus	Succeeded by Quintus Veranius, and Gaius Pompeius Longus Gallus
