= History of poison =

The international pictogram for toxic chemicals.

The history of poison stretches from before 4500 BCE to the present day. Poisons have been used for many purposes across the span of human existence, most commonly as weapons, anti-venoms, and medicines. Poison has been heavily studied in toxicology, among other sciences, and its use has led to several technological innovations.

Poison was discovered in ancient times, and was used by ancient tribes and civilizations as a hunting tool to quicken and ensure the death of their prey or enemies. This use of poison grew more advanced, and many of these ancient peoples began forging weapons designed specifically for poison enhancement. Later in history, particularly at the time of the Roman Empire, one of the more prevalent uses was assassination. As early as 331 BCE, poisonings executed at the dinner table or in drinks were reported, and the practice became a common occurrence. The use of fatal substances was seen among every social class; the nobility would often use it to dispose of unwanted political or economic opponents.

In Medieval Europe, poison became a more popular form of killing, though cures surfaced for many of the more widely known poisons. This was stimulated by the increased availability of poisons; shops known as apothecaries, selling various medicinal wares, were open to the public, and from there, substances that were traditionally used for curative purposes were employed for more sinister ends. At approximately the same time, in the Middle East, Arabs developed a form of arsenic that is odorless and transparent, making the poison difficult to detect. This "poison epidemic" was also prevalent in parts of Asia at this time.

Over the centuries, the variety of harmful uses of poisons continued to increase. The means for curing these poisons also advanced in parallel. In the modern world, intentional poisoning is less common than the Middle Ages. Rather, the more common concern is the risk of accidental poisoning from everyday substances and products.

Constructive uses for poisons have increased considerably in the modern world. Poisons are now used as pesticides, disinfectants, cleaning solutions, and preservatives. Nonetheless, poison continues to be used as a hunting tool in remote parts of developing countries.

== Origins of poison ==
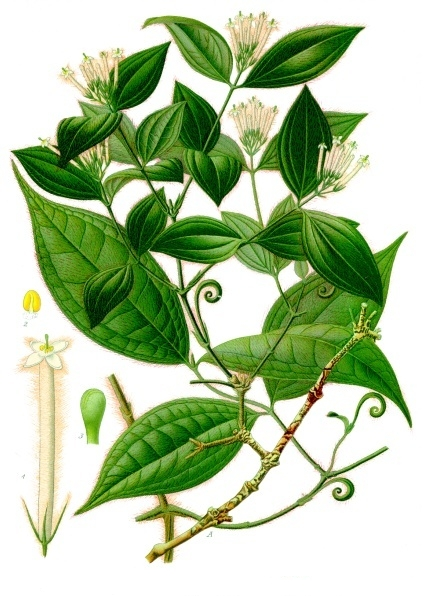
Strychnos toxifera, a plant used for the making of dart and arrow poisons

Archaeological findings prove that while ancient mankind used conventional weapons such as axes and clubs, and later swords, they sought more subtle, destructive means of causing death—something that could be achieved through poison. Grooves for storing or holding poisons such as tubocurarine have been plainly found in their hunting weapons and tools, showing that early humans had discovered poisons of varying potency and applied them to their weapons. Some speculate that this use and existence of these strange and noxious substances was kept secret within the more important and higher-ranked members of a tribe or clan, and were seen as emblems of a greater power. This may have also given birth to the concept of the stereotypical "medicine man" or "witch doctor".

Once the use and danger of poison was realized, it became apparent that something had to be done. Mithridates VI, King of Pontus (an ancient Hellenistic state of northern Anatolia), from around 114–63 BC, lived in constant fear of being assassinated through poison. He became a hard-working pioneer in the search for a cure for poisons. In his position of power, he was able to test poisons on criminals facing execution, and then if there was a possible antidote. He was paranoid to the point that he administered daily amounts of poisons in an attempt to make himself immune to as many poisons as he could. Eventually, he discovered a formula that combined small portions of dozens of the best-known herbal remedies of the time, which he named Mithridatium. This was kept secret until his kingdom was invaded by Pompey the Great, who took it back to Rome. After being defeated by Pompey, Mithridates' antidote prescriptions and notes of medicinal plants were taken by the Romans and translated into Latin.

Pliny the Elder describes over 7000 different poisons. One he describes as "The blood of a duck found in a certain district of Pontus, which was supposed to live on poisonous food, and the blood of this duck was afterwards used in the preparation of the Mithridatum, because it fed on poisonous plants and suffered no harm."

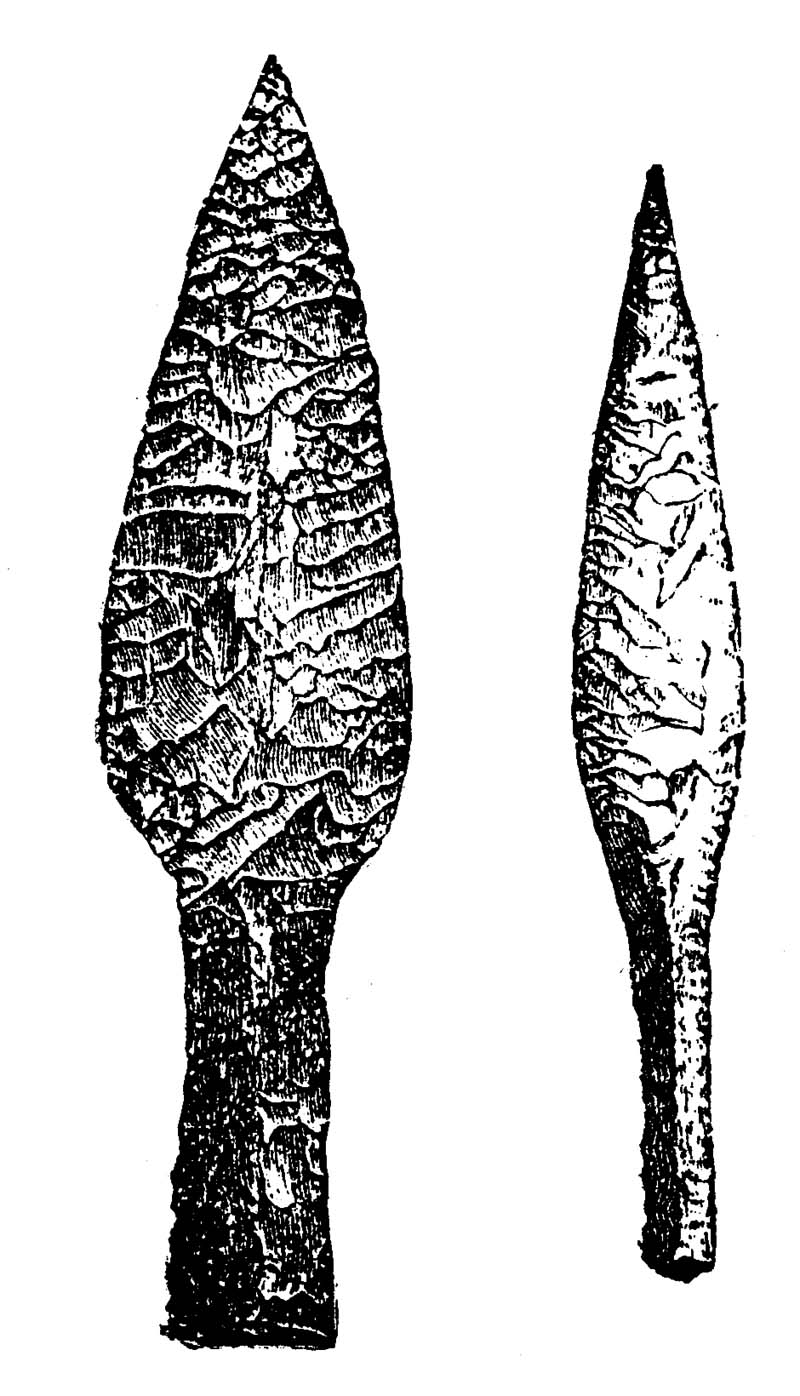
An example of a flint sword and spear, weapons used for hunting in ancient times.

=== Egypt ===
Unlike many civilizations, records of Egyptian knowledge and use of poisons can only be dated back to approximately 3000 BC. However, it is believed that the earliest known Egyptian pharaoh, Menes, studied the properties of poisonous plants and venoms, according to early records.

The Egyptians are also thought to have come into knowledge about elements such as antimony, copper, crude arsenic, lead, opium, and mandrake (among others) which are mentioned in papyri. Egyptians are now thought to be the first to master distillation, and to manipulate the poison that can be retrieved from apricot kernels.

Cleopatra is said to have poisoned herself with an asp after hearing of Marc Antony's demise. Prior to her death, she was said to have sent many of her maidservants to act as guinea pigs to test different poisons, including belladonna, henbane, and the strychnine tree's seed.

After this, the alchemist Agathodaemon (around AD 300) spoke of a mineral that when mixed with natron produced a 'fiery poison'. He described this poison as 'disappearing in water', giving a clear solution. Emsley speculates that the 'fiery poison' was arsenic trioxide, the unidentified mineral having to have been either realgar or orpiment, due to the relation between the unidentified mineral and his other writings.

=== India ===
Indian surgeon Sushruta defined the stages of slow poisoning and the remedies of slow poisoning. He also mentions antidotes and the use of traditional substances to counter the effects of poisoning.

Poisoned weapons were used in ancient India, and war tactics in ancient India have references to poison. A verse in Sanskrit reads "Jalam visravayet sarmavamavisravyam ca dusayet," which translates to "Waters of wells were to be mixed with poison and thus polluted."

Chānakya (c. 350–283 BC), also known as Kautilya, was adviser and prime minister to the first Maurya Emperor Chandragupta (c. 340–293 BC). Kautilya suggested employing means such as seduction, secret use of weapons, and poison for political gain. He also urged detailed precautions against assassination—tasters for food and elaborate ways to detect poison. In addition, the death penalty for violations of royal decrees was frequently administered through the use of poison.

=== Rome ===
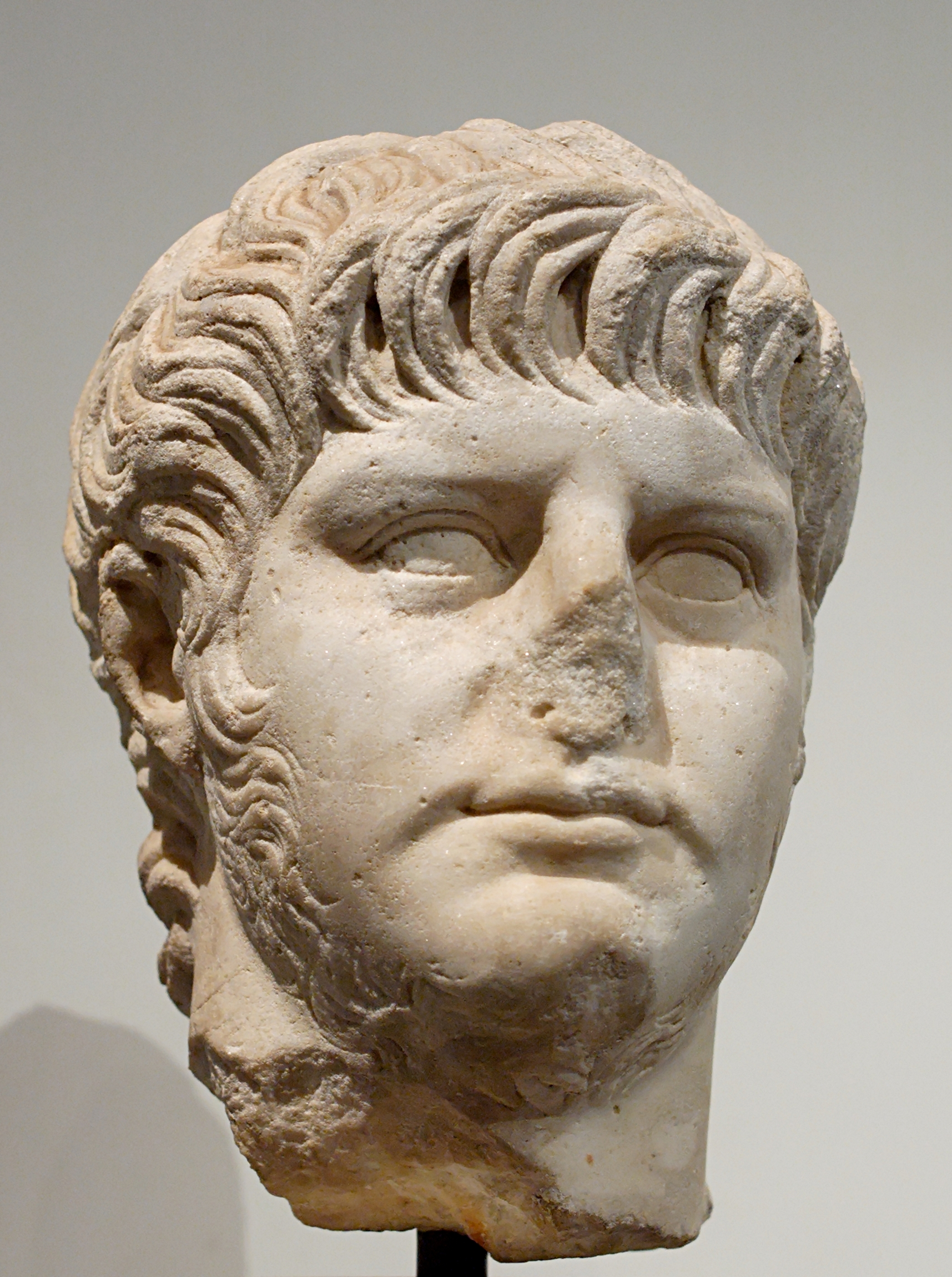
A bust of the Roman Emperor Nero, who used cyanide to dispose of unwanted family members

In Rome, homicidal poisonings can be traced back as far as 331 BC. These poisonings would have been used for self-advantageous reasons in every class of the social order, and were often carried out at common eating or drinking areas. The writer Livy describes the poisoning of members of the upper class and nobles of Rome, and Roman emperor Nero is known to have favored the use of poisons on his relatives, even hiring a personal poisoner. His preferred enema poison was said to be cyanide.

Nero's predecessor, Claudius, was allegedly poisoned with mushrooms or alternatively poison herbs. However, accounts of the way Claudius died vary greatly. Halotus, his taster, Gaius Stertinius Xenophon, his doctor, and the infamous poisoner Locusta have all been accused of possibly being the administrator of the fatal substance, but Agrippina, his final wife, is considered to be the most likely to have arranged his murder and may have even administered the poison herself. Some report that he died after prolonged suffering following a single dose at his evening meal, while some say that he recovered somewhat, only to be poisoned once more by a feather dipped in poison which was pushed down his throat under the pretense of helping him to vomit, or by poisoned gruel or an enema. Agrippina is considered to be the murderer, because she was ambitious for her son, Nero, and Claudius had become suspicious of her intrigues.

=== Later imperial Asia ===
Despite the negative effects of poison, which were so evident in these times, cures were being found in poison, even at such a time where it was hated by most of the general public. An example can be found in the works of Iranian born Persian physician, philosopher, and scholar Rhazes, writer of Secret of Secrets, which was a long list of chemical compounds, minerals and apparatus, the first man to distil alcohol and use it as an anti-septic, and the person who suggested mercury be used as a laxative. He made discoveries relating to a mercury chloride called corrosive sublimate. An ointment derived from this sublimate was used to cure what Rhazes described as 'the itch', which is now referred to as scabies. This proved an effective treatment because of mercury's poisonous nature and ability to penetrate the skin, allowing it to eliminate the disease and the itch.

=== Nazi suicides by poison ===
Nazi war leader Hermann Göring used cyanide to kill himself the night before he was supposed to be hanged during the Nuremberg trials. Adolf Hitler had also taken a pill of cyanide but he bit down on the capsule and shot himself in the right temple shortly before the fall of Berlin along with his wife, Eva Braun.

== Present day ==
Poison/Drug	Antidote
paracetamol (acetaminophen)	N-acetylcysteine
vitamin K anticoagulants, e.g. warfarin	vitamin K, Protamine
narcotics/opioids	naloxone
iron (and other heavy metals)	deferoxamine
benzodiazepines	flumazenil
ethylene glycol	ethanol or fomepizole
methanol	ethanol or fomepizole
cyanide	amyl nitrite, sodium nitrite, and sodium thiosulfate

In the late 20th century, an increasing number of products used for everyday life proved to be poisonous. The risk of being poisoned nowadays lies more in the accidental factor, where poison be induced or taken by accident. Poisoning is the 4th most common cause of death within young people. Accidental ingestions are most common in children less than 5 years old.

However, hospital and emergency facilities are much enhanced compared to the first half of the 20th century and before, and antidotes are more available. Antidotes have been found for many poisons, and the antidotes for some of the most commonly known poisons are shown in the table above:

However, poison still exists as a murderous entity today, but it is not as popular form of conducting murder as it used to be in past times, probably because of the wider range of ways to kill people, better detection, and other factors that must be taken into consideration. One of the more recent deaths by poisoning was that of Russian dissident Alexander Litvinenko in 2006 from lethal polonium-210 radiation poisoning.

=== Other uses ===
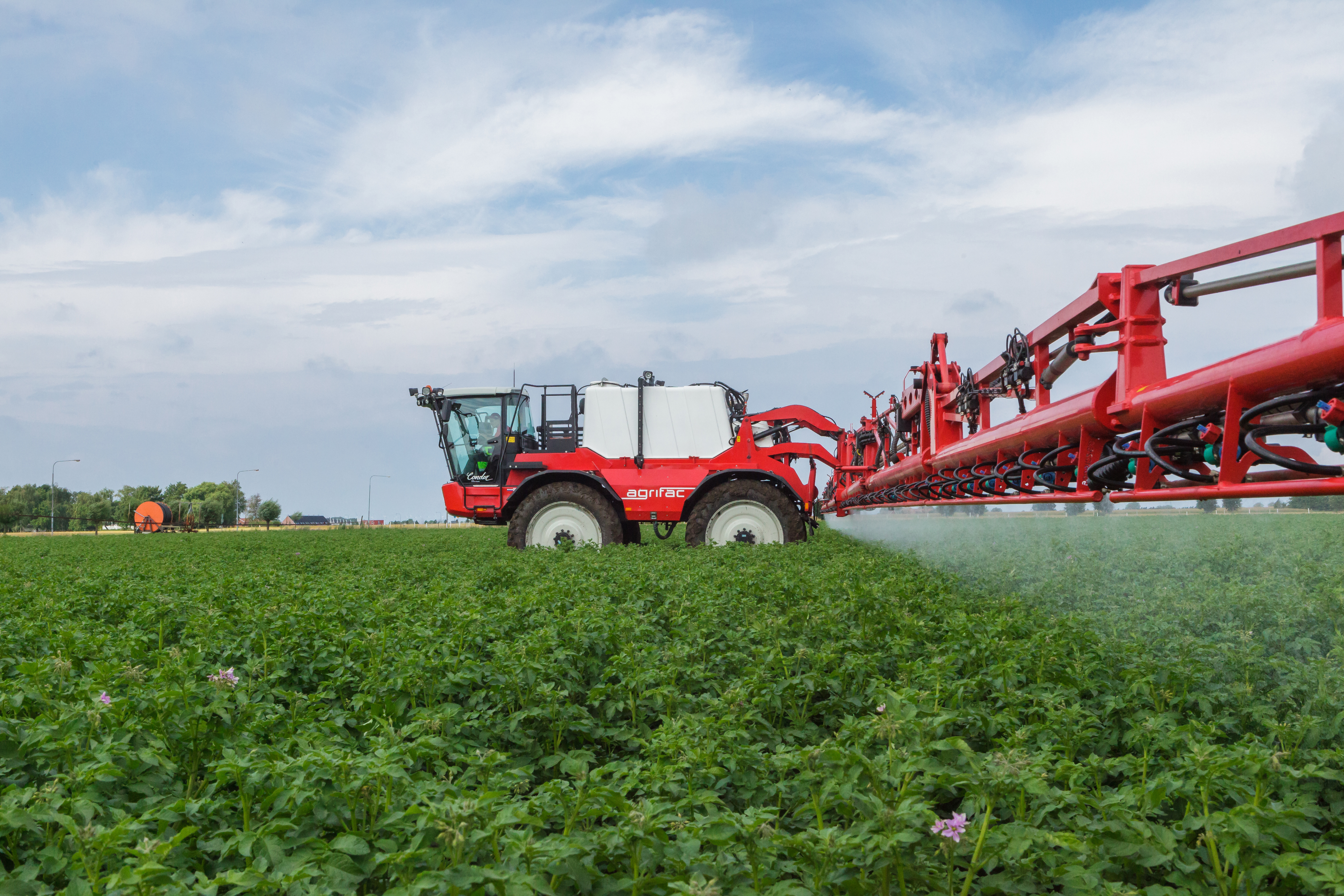
A self-propelled field sprayer used to apply pesticides.

Today, poison is used for a wider variety of purposes than it used to be. For example, poison can be used to rid an unwanted infestation by pests or to kill weeds. Such chemicals, known as pesticides, have been known to be used in some form since about 2500 BC. However, the use of pesticides has increased staggeringly from 1950, and presently approximately 2.5 million tons of industrial pesticides are used each year. Other poisons can also be used to preserve foods and building material.

=== In culture ===
Today, in many developing peoples of countries such as certain parts of Africa, South America and Asia, the use of poison as an actual weapon of hunting and attack still endures.

In Africa, certain arrow poisons are made using floral ingredients, such as of that taken from the plant Acokanthera. This plant contains ouabain, which is a cardiac glycoside, oleander, and milkweeds. Poisoned arrows are also still used in the jungle areas of Assam, Burma and Malaysia. The ingredients for the creation of these poisons are mainly extracted from plants of the Antiaris, Strychnos and Strophanthus genera, and Antiaris toxicaria (a tree of the mulberry and breadfruit family), for example, is used in the Java island of Indonesia, as well as several of its surrounding islands. The juice or liquid extracts are smeared on the head of the arrow, and inflicts the target paralysis, convulsions and/or cardiac arrest, virtually on strike due to the speed in which the extracts can affect a victim.

As well as plant based poisons, there are others that are made that are based on animals. For example, the larva or pupae of a beetle genus of the Northern Kalahari Desert is used to create a slow-acting poison that can be quite useful when hunting. The beetle itself is applied to the arrow head, by squeezing the contents of the beetle right onto the head. Plant sap is then mixed and serves as an adhesive. However, instead of the plant sap, a powder made from the dead, eviscerated larva can be used.

== See also ==
- Visha Kanya
- Chinese alchemical elixir poisoning
- Forensic science
- List of chemical elements
- List of Extremely Hazardous Substances
- List of poisonings
- Poison
- Toxicity

== References and notes ==
- Emsley, John (May 2005). The Elements of Murder: A History of Poison. New York: Oxford University Press. ISBN 0-19-280599-1.
