= Kameni =

Kameni may refer to:

- Carlos Kameni (born 1984), Cameroonian football player
- Mathurin Kameni (born 1978), Cameroonian football player
- Nea Kameni ('New Kameni'), an island of Greece
- Palaia Kameni ('Old Kameni'), an island of Greece
