= Polyclitus =

Polyclitus is a Greek name. Notable people with the name and its variants include:

- Polykleitos (died c. 420 BC), ancient Greek sculptor who created the eponymous Canon, also called Polykleitos of Argos and Polykleitos the Elder to distinguish him from his son, below
- Polykleitos the Younger, 4th century BC ancient Greek architect
- Polyclitus (freedman) (died 68), freedman in the imperial court of the Roman emperor Nero
