= Nea Kameni =

Island in the Santorini caldera, Greece

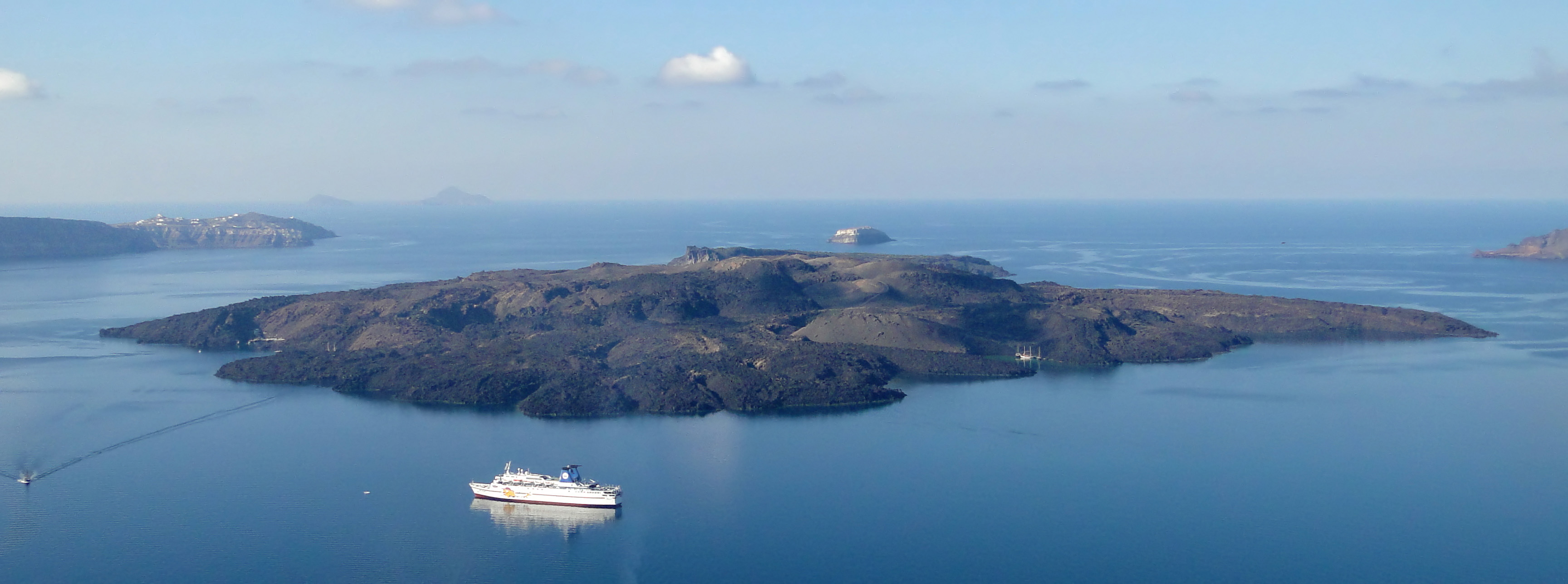
- Nea Kameni seen from Thera, Santorini

Highest point
- Elevation: 114 m (374 ft)
- Coordinates: 36°24′N 25°24′E

Geography
- Location: Santorini, Greece

Geology
- Mountain type: Lava dome
- Volcanic arc: South Aegean Volcanic Arc
- Last eruption: 1950

Nea Kameni is a small, uninhabited Greek island of volcanic origin located in the Aegean Sea, within the flooded Santorini caldera. Nea Kameni (new burnt) and the neighbouring small island Palea Kameni (old burnt) have formed over the past two millennia through repeated eruptions of dacite lava and ash. The Roman historian Cassius Dio records in the year 47 CE "This year a small islet, hitherto unknown, made an appearance close to the island of Thera." Cassius' report may refer to Palaia Kameni. Pliny the Elder reported the emergence of a new island on July 8, in the year of the consulship of M. Junius Silanus and L. Balbus, thus 19 CE.

Major eruptions over the past 300 years took place in 1707–1712, 1866–1870, 1925–1928, and 1939–1941. The last small eruption happened in 1950 and involved lava dome extrusion.

Nea Kameni is nearly round, and has a diameter of approximately 2 kilometers and an area of 3.4 km^{2}. It is monitored closely by scientists from the Institute for the Study and Monitoring of the Santorini Volcano (ISMOSAV), and is a protected scientific site. The island has many vents, one of which is an active sulfur vent, named Jorgo (George), as well as a carpet of red grassy succulents on the thin soil in the summertime. The active vent was named by the locals after King George I of Greece, as the vent was active the day after the King visited Santorini.

The nearly barren island is visited daily by dozens of tourist boats throughout the summer. Visitors climb a gravel path to reach the top of the 130-meter-high volcanic crater, where it is possible to complete a full circuit of the rim.

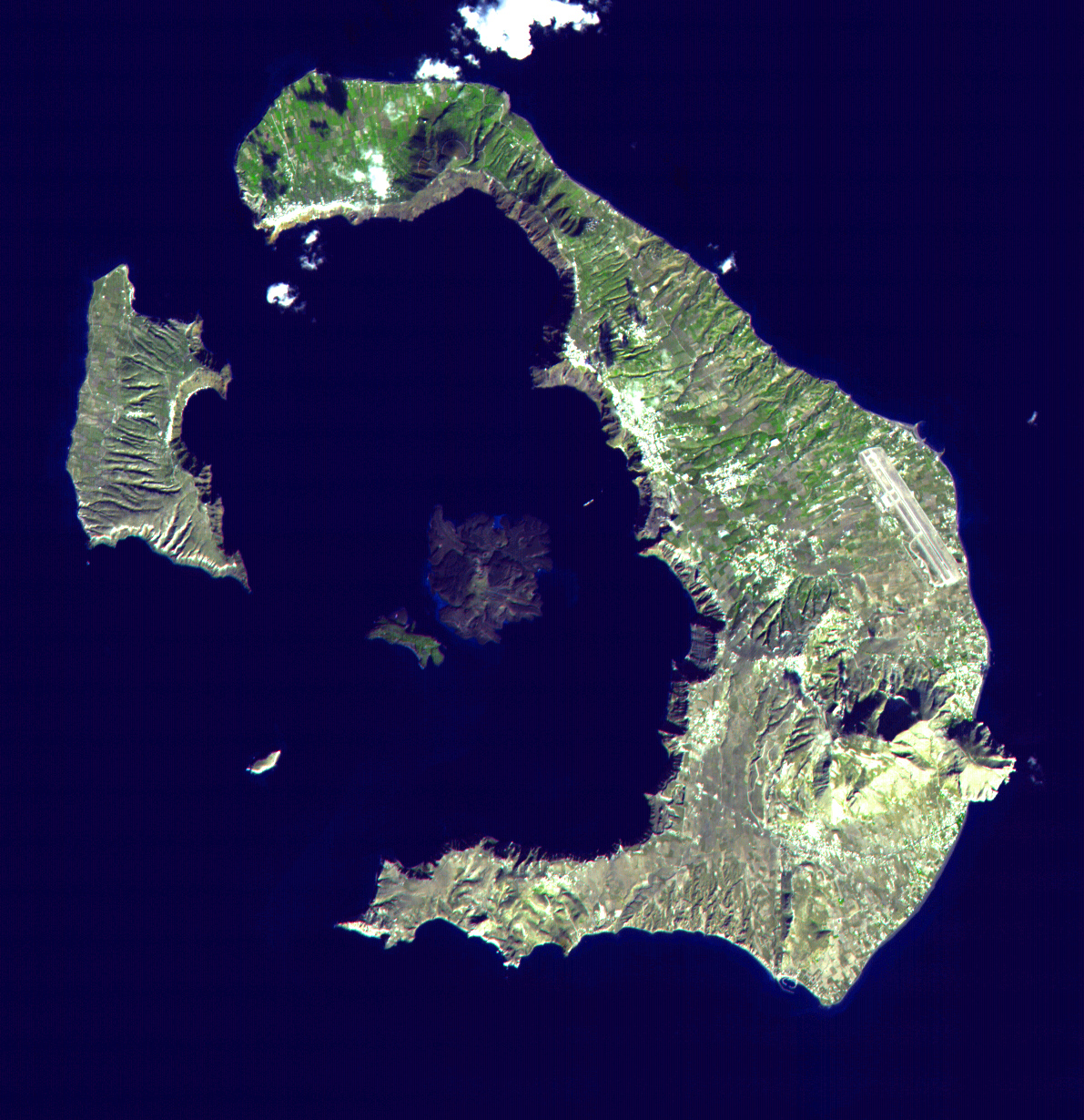
The Santorini caldera, with Nea Kameni in the center

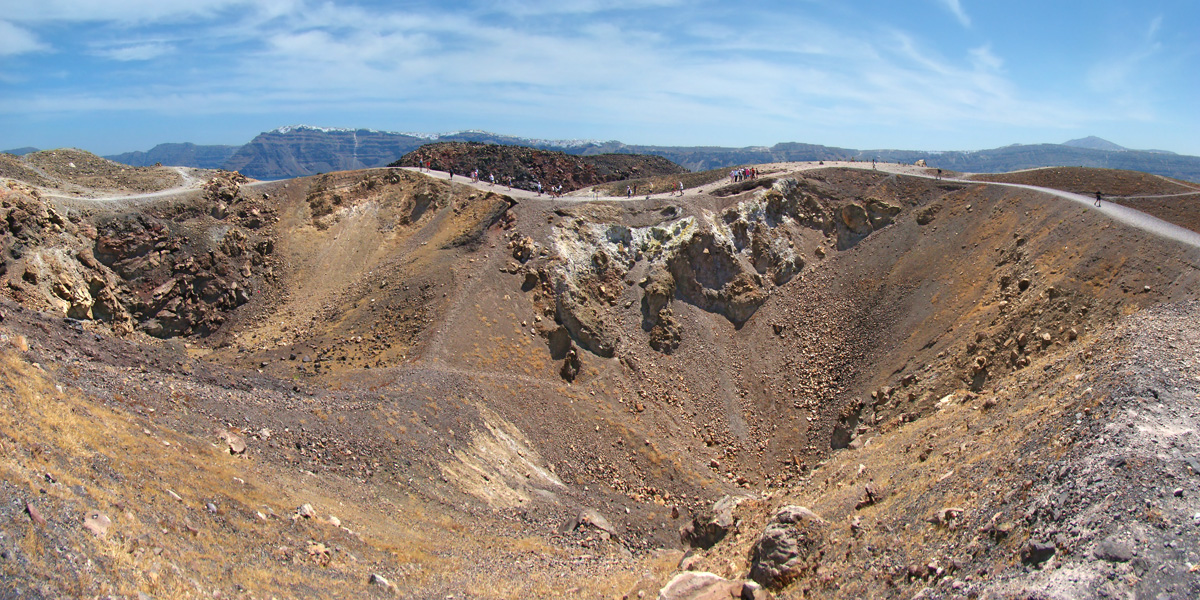
The volcanic crater of Nea Kameni

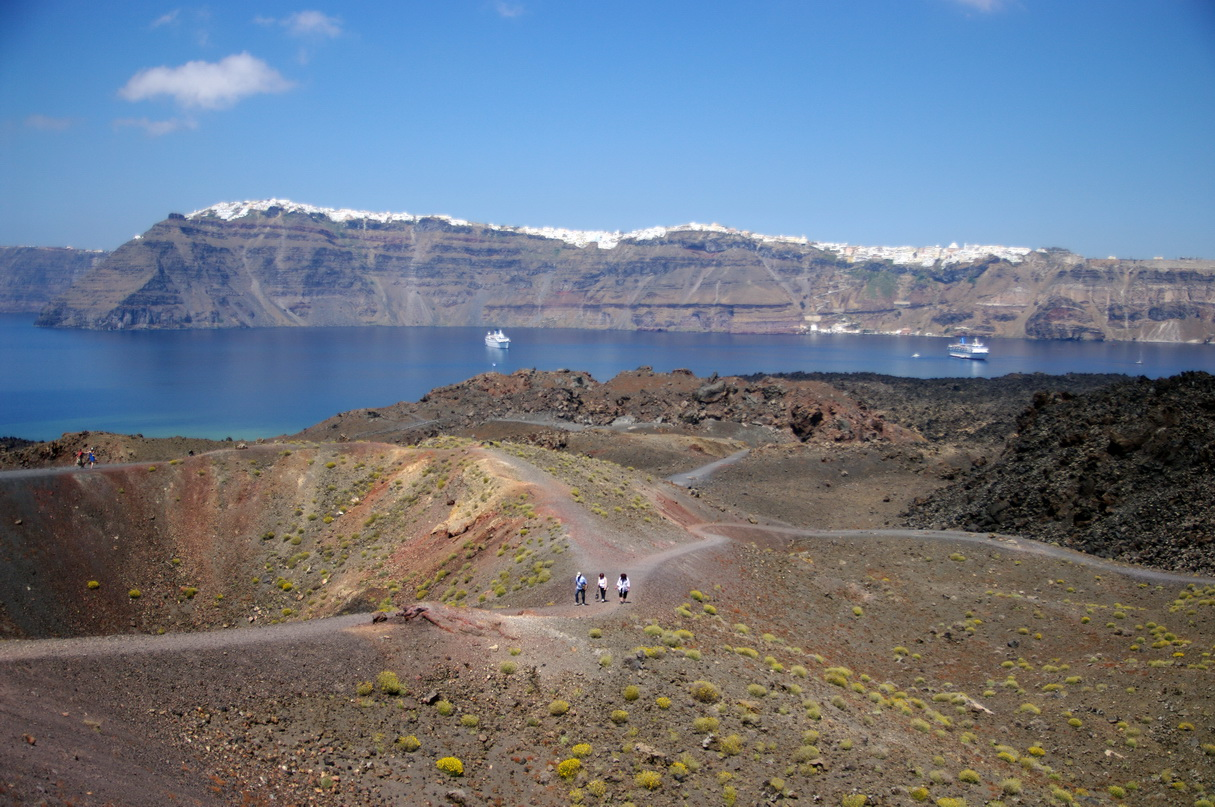
View of Santorini from the Nea Kameni crater
