= F.A.N.G. (Street Fighter) =

Street Fighter character

F.A.N.G
- Street Fighter character
- First appearance: Street Fighter V (2016)
- Created by: Capcom
- Voiced by: EN:Jesse Merlin; JA: Shigeru Chiba

In-universe information
- Fighting style: Chinese Kenpō with poison
- Origin: Asia

F.A.N.G (ファン, Fan) is a character in Capcom's Street Fighter series. He made his first appearance in Street Fighter V as one of sixteen playable characters at the game's launch in 2016. Within series lore, F.A.N.G is an assassin who uses poison techniques to complement his fighting style and the self-proclaimed second-in-command of Shadaloo, as he considers himself ranking only below M. Bison in the hierarchy. While the character is generally well received by video game journalists due to his eccentric character design and unconventional gameplay, F.A.N.G is known for being one of the least played characters in Street Fighter V, both in casual and professional play. This is because F.A.N.G is often perceived to be one of the game's weakest characters, even underpowered, and is thus an undesirable choice in player versus player matches.

== Creation and development ==
Within series lore, F.A.N.G is a master of Poison Hand Kenpō (毒手拳法, Dokushu Kenpō). F.A.N.G has developed the ability to resist poison of all types regardless of its strength or origins, due to his skill in mixing toxins as well as his training as an assassin. The idea of a fighter who uses poison in the Street Fighter games was originally considered during development of Street Fighter III: 3rd Strike, when the team members had a debate on including Remy or a different poison-using character. F.A.N.G was originally conceived as a Shaolin monk archetype for the roster of Street Fighter V. According to producer Koichi Sugiyama, the character's sleeves are wide as a hidden weapon style was one of the ideas they considered for F.A.N.G during the design stage, but the idea was eventually abandoned as returning character Vega already uses a claw.

F.A.N.G is first unveiled in a gameplay trailer as a "tall and spindly member" of M. Bison's villainous organization Shadaloo who uses a "tricky and deceptive fighting style" and speaks with a high-pitched voice. F.A.N.G is depicted as being obsessed with the number 2 as well as any extension of the concept. For example, the character would exclaim that he will finish off his opponents in two minutes for his introduction cutscene, and he proudly proclaims himself as the second most important person in the Shadaloo organization after M. Bison. As part of his Critical Art, special attacks introduced in Street Fighter V which are similar in usage and requirements to a Super Combo, F.A.N.G leaps into the air, flaps his arms like wings, and drops poison bombs on the arena floor while exclaiming "I'll turn into a bird!". Commenting on the then-upcoming story mode for Street Fighter V, Sugiyama noted that F.A.N.G is the most deeply involved character in an important event within the narrative.

In February 2020, Capcom revealed through their official Street Fighter Twitter account that F.A.N.G is an acronym that stands for "Fantastic Asian Notorious Gang".

== Appearances ==
F.A.N.G appears in Street Fighter V as the newest member of the Four Heavenly Kings of Shadaloo following Sagat's departure from the organization, and presents himself as the self-proclaimed second-in-command to M. Bison. His backstory reveals that he was originally a leader of the Nguuhao Cartel, and that he was involved in their plot to pledge their false allegiance to Shadaloo in an attempt to murder Bison. The plot backfired, and Bison responded by slaughtering the entire cartel, leaving their most skilled assassin, F.A.N.G, the sole survivor. He initially intended to resist Bison and fight to the death, but he changed his mind and swore unyielding loyalty to Bison upon knowing the extent of his powers. He plays a major role in the game's story mode, A Shadow Falls, as Bison's most loyal underling, and serves as the story's overall secondary antagonist opposing Karin Kanzuki's faction of warriors, all while attempting to fend off a revived Charlie Nash and the mysterious entity Necalli in defense of Bison. He is later revealed to be the murderer of Rashid's friend, after she managed to prepare and upload a program to countermeasure Shadaloo's plan to Rashid before F.A.N.G killed her.

In Street Fighter V Side Story: Toxicity, which takes place after the death of Bison, F.A.N.G is revealed to have survived the fall of Shadaloo and retreats to Shanghai, where he focuses his efforts to revive Shadaloo as an organization. He takes in a teenage prostitute, whom he names "Phantom", and begins training her as his protégé. F.A.N.G appears as a non-playable character in Street Fighter 6's World Tour Mode, while Phantom, now known as A.K.I, is playable via downloadable content. In World Tour, he goes under the pseudonym "Fang Fei" and deals illegal medicine. He uses the avatar and A.K.I to investigate JP's attempts to revive Shadaloo, and the resurrection of Bison.

F.A.N.G also appears in the Street Fighter comic book series published by UDON, where he fixes Seth's Tanden Engine for Shadaloo in an effort to reprogram him.

Due to his fundamental design concept as well as subsequent patches released by Capcom which further reduces the character's offensive capabilities, F.A.N.G is noted for his steep learning curve. F.A.N.G is a charge character, requiring second-long maintained button presses in various directions to properly execute moves. The character fights using poison, a mechanic which involves a slow whittling of the opponent's health bar introduced into the Street Fighter series via its fifth mainline installment. His primary fighting tactic is to keep the opponent perpetually poisoned in order to wear them down and make opportunistic attacks using his long reach: when an opponent comes into contact with his special moves, including an unblockable projectile called Nishodoku, they become poisoned and slowly lose hit points. The moment F.A.N.G himself takes damage, the poison status is removed. A player could pressure opponents incessantly with poison attacks that both damages the opposing character and forces them into action, since hitting F.A.N.G will remove the effect. F.A.N.G also has access to an array of confusing moves to mixup the opponent which benefits a skilled player; any time he manages to get a knockdown, his foe will rise from it only to contend with more unfamiliar setups.

== Critical reception ==
F.A.N.G is consistently the least used character in Street Fighter V. He was placed 78th in a worldwide Street Fighter character poll held between 2017 and 2018. In a review for Street Fighter V shortly after its 2016 launch for Kotaku, Evan Narcisse's initial observations of F.A.N.G assessed him as "the kind of character who seems tailor-made for players concerned with developing upper-tier skills". Subsequent evaluations ranked F.A.N.G very low on tier lists, which are crowd-sourced lists of character rosters by the game's player community that attempt to rank playable characters for their viability in player versus player matches. Patch updates following the game's launch have also greatly reduced the character's damage output, which according to Michael Martin from Yahoo!, "spells trouble in a game so focused on offense". In spite of this, certain professional level players have achieved some measure of success with the character. For example, one of the first two players in the world to reach Super Platinum status and attained former top spot on the global leaderboard, played as the character. Within the professional esports tournament scene, F.A.N.G was associated with prominent Street Fighter player Xian, known for his execution and optimization of "unusual, unlikeable, and oft-misunderstood characters". In an interview with Kotaku, Xian explained that he like playing with F.A.N.G because his visual design appealed to him and that he share many aesthetic similarities with Gen, another Street Fighter character known for being underpowered or difficult to master, and is also associated with Xian in Street Fighter IV tournaments. Further, he noted that playing F.A.N.G helped him understand the game in a deeper way, and that "many players are very unfamiliar with character who are not played a lot". Nevertheless, Xian's decision to switch to Ibuki for professional play as of 2017 was welcomed by Martin.

Critical commentary of the character generally focused on his outlandish character design, as well as his unusual poison-based attacks. Gavin Jasper from Den of Geek placed F.A.N.G 41st in his ranking list of Street Fighter characters, and praised the character for bringing some genuine originality to the series in play style and as an "obnoxious, dancing mad scientist" who strikes the "right balance of dorky and genuine threat". Steven Hansen from Destructoid liked the character's overall visual design: he said F.A.N.G looks like a Thin Man from the XCOM series, his Critical Art animation is reminiscent of a humanoid character model "rigged onto a small bird's animations", and that his walking animation is a "Looney Tunes style creep complete with hunched shoulders and craned arms like a goofy t-rex or Montgomery Burns". On the other hand, Hansen expressed confusion as to whether F.A.N.G is meant to be a racist Chinese caricature, noting that another Chinese character Chun-Li pointed out that his favorite number, 2, was not written out in proper Chinese characters on his outfit and questioned if he is really Chinese at all. Maddy Myers from Kotaku opined that the character's falsetto voice and goofy hat makes him look anything but "tough or intimidating".

In August 2020, organizers of the Street Fighter subreddit online tournament series attracted controversy: instead of focusing on providing meaningful commentary, the commentators played fart sounds over a match between two players who both played F.A.N.G in a mirror match. Commenting on the incident, Ian Walker from Kotaku explained that the character's "wacky moveset" does not always translate to wins in serious competition and that the tournament organizers, like some quarters in the fighting game community, appeared to have an issue with respecting playstyles or matchups which are not considered to be legitimate or exciting. Walker noted that this mentality often manifests whenever a zoning character "who relies on heavy fireball usage and hit-and-run tactics" sets the tone of a match, because it often means spectators may expect "a slow fight with little engagement".
