= Aulus Didius Gallus Fabricius Veiento =

1st century Roman senator and consul

Suffect consul of the Roman Empire
- In office between 71 – 79

Suffect consul II of the Roman Empire
- In office January AD 80 – February 80 Serving with Lucius Aelius Lamia Plautius Aelianus

Suffect consul III of the Roman Empire
- In office ? 1 February AD 83 – ? 28 February 83 Serving with ? Lucius Junius Quintus Vibius Crispus

Personal details
- Born: Unknown
- Died: Unknown
- Spouse: Attica

Military service
- Allegiance: Roman Empire

Aulus Didius Gallus Fabricius Veiento was a Roman senator who played a major role in the courts of several Roman emperors during the first century AD. For his usefulness, Veiento was rewarded with the office of suffect consul three times in a period when three consulates were very rare for non-members of the Imperial family.

Modern authorities have interpreted the nature of Veiento's role in different ways. Older writers, following the insinuations of Cassius Dio and Pliny the Younger, tended to ascribe to Veiento a malevolent role. For example, Ronald Syme summarized his career in this sentence: "Veiento began as a dealer in petty patronage, and he ended as a merchant of honor." William C. McDermott has since provided a more balanced evaluation of this figure. This has led more recent writers to evaluate him as "one of the most interesting of his Domitian's senatorial amici, frequently but erroneously classified as an informer during the so-called reign of terror."

== Life ==
His name suggests that Veiento was related to Aulus Didius Gallus, suffect consul of AD 39 and governor of Roman Britain. Some experts, such as Edmund Groag and Mario Torelli, thought that Veiento was the son or grandson of the governor of Britain. Olli Salomies has shown that it is more likely that Veiento was adopted by Didius Gallus at some point before Veiento became praetor.

Jones speculates that it was while he was with Didius Gallus that he first met the future emperors, "for Domitian's father and brother commanded two of Claudius's legions in the British invasions."

=== Career under Nero ===
Veiento's first recorded appearance occurred when he held the office of praetor. According to Cassius Dio, the emperor Nero's favor of charioteers and horsekeepers had led them to make unreasonable demands. In response, Veiento replaced them with chariots drawn by trained dogs. This led Brian W. Jones to describe him as "one of the earliest known strike-breakers."

However, the year Veiento was praetor is not known. S. J. de Laet proposed 41; McDermott believed he was praetor in 54; Jones in 1971 pointed out that "there is nothing to prevent its being dated to around 60, to some time towards the end of the Quinquennium Neronis", although in a later publication admitted that 54 was "possible". If Veiento reached the rank of praetor at the legal age of 30, and if McDermott's date of 54 for his holding it is accepted, then it can be assumed that Veiento was born around the year AD 24.

His next appearance occurs in 62, when he was tried and exiled. Tacitus tells the story:

A similar accusation caused the downfall of Fabricius Veiento. He had composed many libels on senators and pontiffs in a work to which he gave the title of "Codicils." Tullius Geminus, the prosecutor, further stated that he had habitually trafficked in the emperor's favours and in the right of promotion. This was Nero's reason for himself undertaking the trial, and having convicted Veiento, he banished him from Italy, and ordered the burning of his books, which, while it was dangerous to procure them, were anxiously sought and much read. Soon full freedom for their possession caused their oblivion.

McDermott notes, "At first glance this seems to be denigration of Veiento, but a closer look at the passage and its context reveals Veiento in a very different light." McDermott points out the context of this passage — the preceding chapters narrate the resurrection of charges under the Lex Julia maiestatis, or treason — suggests the motivation behind the prosecution was not Veiento's "Codicils", but instead an excuse to confiscate his property. McDermott also notes that what Tacitus says here is not that Veiento sold "the emperor's favours and . . . the right of promotion", but that Tullius Geminus accused Veiento of this. As McDermott argues, "such fictitious additions to the central charge of maiestas laesa were common." It is therefore suggested that Veiento was possibly the victim of court intrigue than the agent of it.

=== Career under Vespasian ===
Veiento returned from exile following the suicide of Nero in 68. He managed to find favor with Vespasian, resulting in his first suffect consulship. The date of this consulship may have occurred early in Vespasian's reign when he first became amicus Caesaris and a member of the consilium principis. His closeness to the Flavian dynasty was shown through his being granted a second suffect consulship was in 80 by Vespasian's son Titus.

So far Veiento's career appears to be anomalous, for there is no definitive record of him holding any preceding offices that would form part of his passage through the cursus honorum. McDermott identifies him as the subject of a fragmentary inscription found at Arles, and his restoration of this inscription, which he admits is speculative in places, shows he was governor of three provinces (one of which was either Asia or Africa), as well as legate of an unknown legion — which would supply Veiento with a conventional career. Although Gallivan accepts the identification, other experts have yet to accept the provinces McDermott proposes for Veiento. In a response to McDermott's paper, Brian Jones asserted "there is no evidence to suggest that Quintus Vibius Crispus could not have held the offices which the inscription mentions." Further, Werner Eck offers a different restoration of the first line and argues that the inscription pertains to Marcus Pompeius Silvanus Staberius Flavianus.

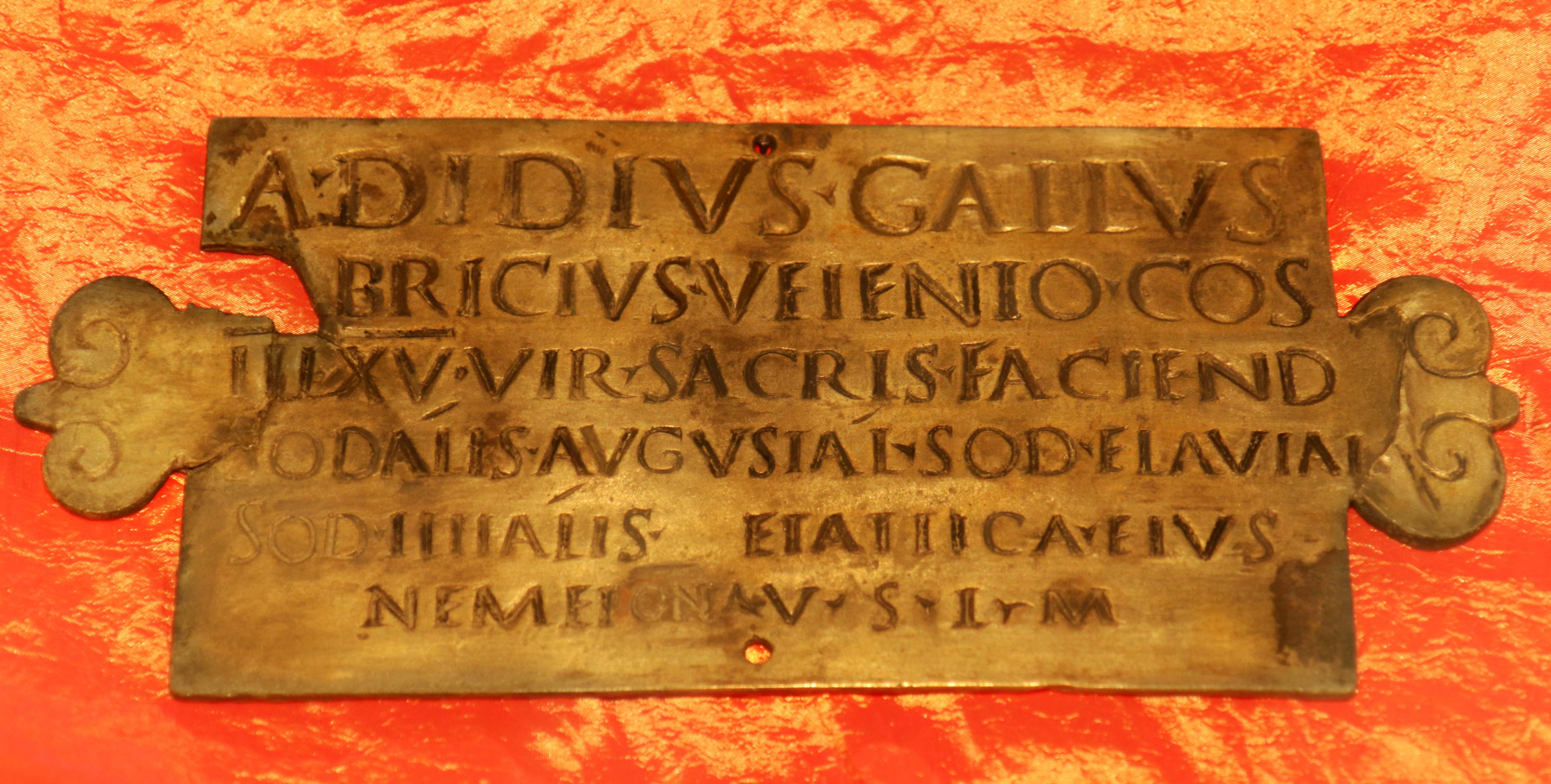
Copy of the votive inscription by Veiento and his wife Attica. (CIL XIII, 7253)

Veiento's career in the Roman priesthood is far better documented. A votive inscription of Trajanic date recording Veiento's fulfilling of a vow to the goddess Nemetona in Moguntiacum (Mainz) attests to the priesthoods he held. These offices are listed as follows: Quindecimviri sacris faciundis, one of the four most prestigious ancient Roman priesthoods; Sodales Augustales; Sodales Flaviales; and Sodales Titialis. McDermott dates his membership in the Quindecimviri "possibly under Nero before his exile in 62. He may even have become a member while his adoptive father was still alive." When he became Sodales Augustales and Sodales Titialis is not known. Entrance to the Sodales Flaviales is dated soon after Vespasian's death.

Not only may this explain his status in Domitian's reign, for the emperor is known to have been interested in the minutiae of religion, but McDermott points out it may explain the reason behind Veiento's "Codicils", as an attack on the "levity and inattention to rituals" of his peers.

=== Career under Domitian ===
More details have survived about Veiento's role in Domitian's reign. Both a fragment of Statius' De bello Germanico and Juvenal's Satire IV show that Veiento, with Lucius Junius Quintus Vibius Crispus, the elderly Acilius Glabrio, the blind Lucius Valerius Catullus Messalinus, and Veiento were four of Domitian's most important advisors. Jones agrees in part with this evaluation, but argues that these amici were "summoned to court only when he needed their advice." Those who had real power were Domitian's own appointees: the urban prefect Plotius Pegasus, praetorian prefects like Lucius Laberius Maximus, the a cubiculo, and the a rationibus.

There is also evidence that Veiento accompanied Domitian on his Dacian campaign against the Chatti. Jones explains the context of the bronze tablet found at Moguntiacum due to his presence as Domitian's comes, and speculates that Veiento may have been sent to the commanders there to explain Domitian's strategy, that "must have seemed close to cowardice to most of them" yet was as effective as the Fabian strategy against Hannibal.

Lastly, it was under Domitian when Veiento was appointed consul a third time, which experts believe was in 83.

=== Career under Nerva ===
Veiento survived the assassination of Domitian without loss of rank or property, and he next appears at a banquet hosted by the emperor Nerva during the first year of his reign (AD 97). Pliny the Younger recounts how Veiento had been invited to the same dinner as Junius Mauricus, who had been exiled due to the efforts of a delator or informer. The blind Lucius Valerius Catullus Messalinus, who had been a notorious delator during his lifetime, was mentioned, and the emperor wondered, "If he had gone on living, what do you think would have become of him?" Junius Mauricus replied, "He would be dining with us." Pliny elsewhere in his letter makes it clear the comment was directed at Veiento.

The other incident recorded by Pliny is when Veiento, joined with four other ex-consuls and senators to oppose Pliny's motion to prosecute another delator, Publicius Certus, who had brought down Helvidius Priscus in 93. Despite the fact Pliny was almost alone in pursuing the matter, through his eloquence he convinced the Senate to approve the prosecution, despite a final plea against legal actions from Veiento. While the emperor Nerva failed to act on the motion to prosecute, Certus was passed over in consideration for a consulship, and in any event fell ill and died soon after this session of the Senate.

These two anecdotes have led many writers — such as Syme above — to infer that Veiento himself was an informer who accused many prominent men of crimes in order to seize their wealth; however, as McDermott points out, all these passages prove is that the Younger Pliny greatly disliked Veiento. McDermott notes that Tacitus who, like Veiento, was a member of the Quindecimviri sacris faciundis and either knew the man well, or knew of him, did not consider Veiento a delator. When offering a list of delatores active under Domitian, Tacitus names Mettius Carus, the blind Catullus Messalinus, and Baebius Massa, but not Veiento.

Veiento's last recorded act is on the Senate floor in 97, pleading leniency for Publicius Certus. How much longer he lived is unknown: assuming the above calculation of AD 24 for his birthdate is correct, then Veiento was about 73 at the time of his last appearance. McDermott mentions an allusion in Pliny's Panegyric to the emperor Trajan (delivered 100) to a man sitting in the Senate who had been consul three times, and wonders if it was Veiento; based on his assumed birthdate, this is plausible for he would have been 76 years old at the time.

== Family ==
From the bronze tablet found at Moguntiacum, we know the name of Veiento's wife, Attica. Nothing certain is known of her. Juvenal makes a puzzling allusion to Eppia, the wife of a senator, who deserts her husband and family and follows a gladiator to Egypt; the senator might be Veiento. "Is Eppia the wife of Veiento whose name was Attica (both names are dactyls), or is Veiento merely a type of senex?" McDermott asks. He cannot determine whether the senator is actually the three-time consul, and if so, whether Eppia is a cover name for Attica, or perhaps the name of a second wife.

Political offices
Preceded by Titus Caesar Vespasianus VIII, and Caesar Domitianus VII as ordinary consuls	Suffect consul of the Roman Empire; 80 with Lucius Aelius Lamia Plautius Aelianus	Succeeded by Quintus Aurelius Pactumeius Fronto, and Lucius Aelius Lamia Plautius Aelianus as suffect consuls
