= Locusta =

1st century AD Roman woman known as a maker of poisons

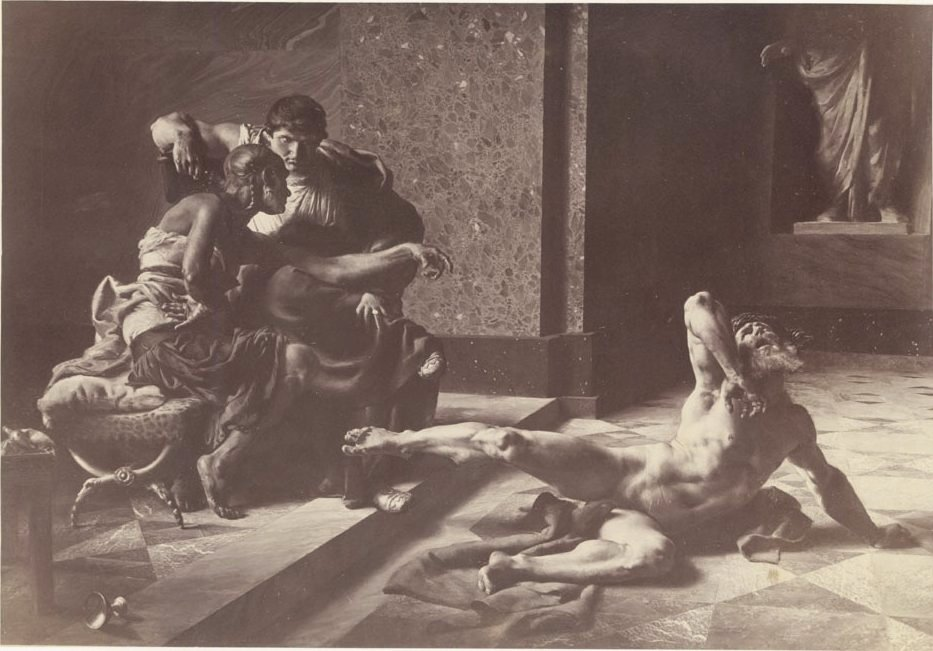
Locusta testing in Nero's presence the poison prepared for Britannicus, painting by Joseph-Noël Sylvestre, 1876

Locusta or Lucusta (died 69), was a notorious maker of poisons in the 1st-century Roman Empire, active in the final two reigns of the Julio-Claudian dynasty. She supposedly took part in the assassinations of Claudius and Britannicus. She was a favourite of emperor Nero for several years, and Nero had her provide training to other poisoners in his service. Following Nero's death, Locusta was executed by his successor, Galba (reigned 68–69).

== Primary sources ==
Locusta's career is described by the ancient historians Tacitus (Annals 12.66 and 13.15), Suetonius (Life of Nero, 33 and 47), and Cassius Dio (61.34 and 63.3). Juvenal also mentions Locusta in Book 1, line 71 of his Satires.

== Biography ==
Locusta was said to have come from Gaul.

=== Poisons expert ===
Locusta served as a poisons expert under empress Agrippina the Younger. According to some historians, in AD 54, already notorious and imprisoned on poisoning charges, Locusta was ordered by Agrippina to supply a poison for the murder of her husband, Claudius. This was sprinkled on a mushroom and given to the emperor by his food-taster Halotus; There is a rumor that when the poison appeared to be ineffectual, the doctor Gaius Stertinius Xenophon murdered Claudius with a poisoned feather ostensibly put down his throat to induce vomiting, although it has yet been verified.

She reportedly advised Agrippina to use Atropa belladonna as a poison. Extracts of atropa have been used for poisoning since antiquity, as the plant and its fruits contain tropane alkaloids (primarily hyoscyamine and scopolamine). Atropa-derived poisons were commonly used in ancient Roman murders, and previous empress Livia reportedly used them to murder her contemporaries. The effective doses of atropa needed to cause hallucinations for up to four days, and the ones needed to kill a person, were described by a 1st-century writer, Pedanius Dioscorides. Dioscorides called the plant "strychnos manikos" or "thryon."

In AD 55, while still imprisoned, Locusta was called upon by Agrippina's son, the emperor Nero, to concoct a poison to murder Claudius' son Britannicus. When this poison was slow to work, Nero flogged Locusta with his own hand and threatened her with immediate execution, whereupon she supplied a quicker-acting poison that succeeded. Nero rewarded Locusta with a full pardon and large country estates, where he sent pupils to learn her craft. Before Nero fled Rome in AD 68, he acquired poison from Locusta for his own use and kept it in a golden box. He eventually died by other means.

=== Execution ===
After Nero's suicide, Locusta was condemned to die by the emperor Galba during his brief reign, which ended 15 January AD 69. Along with Nero's favorites Helius, Patrobius, Narcissus and "others of the scum that had come to the surface in Nero's day," she was led in chains through the city and executed.

== Legacy ==
Les fils de Locuste, silent short film (France, 1911).

Juvenal refers to her in one of his Satires, describing a poisoner as even more skilled than Locusta.

In the novel The Count of Monte Cristo (1844) by Alexandre Dumas, the poisoner Madame de Villefort is frequently compared to Locusta. Chapter 101 is entitled "Locusta."

Locusta was one of the characters depicted in the historical film Humanity Through the Ages (1908) by director Georges Méliès. The film was an episodic depiction of humanity's brutality throughout its history, and the historic episodes depicted were chosen because they involved fratricide, murders, religious persecution, physical abuse and public humiliation, prisons and executions of prisoners, torture, and violent criminal subcultures. The film is thought to be among the lost films from its era.

A silent short film, Les fils de Locuste, was produced in France in 1911.

Locusta appears as a character in the 1965 Doctor Who story The Romans, played by Ann Tirard. Described as the "official poisoner to the court of Caesar Nero," she is portrayed as comically untroubled by the macabre nature of the service she provides.

The band Macabre included a song entitled "Locusta" in their 2011 album Grim Scary Tales. In the song, she is described as one of history's first recorded serial killers who is hired by Agrippina to kill Claudius and Britannicus. The song ends with Locusta being executed in the Circus Maximus by being raped by a trained giraffe and then torn apart by wild animals.

Locusta manifests as an Assassin class Servant in the mobile game Fate/Grand Order, added during the FGO Arcade collaboration event in April 2023.
