= Camerinus Antistius Vetus =

1st century AD Roman senator and consul

Camerinus Antistius Vetus was a Roman senator, who was active during the reign of Claudius. He was suffect consul in the for a few days in the month of March AD 46 as the colleague of Marcus Junius Silanus; Quintus Sulpicius Camerinus is recorded as consul for the rest of the nundinium. Camerinus is also known to have been urban praetor in the year 43. He is known entirely from inscriptions.

Because Camerinus reached the consulate within three years of becoming praetor, one can deduce he was one of the patricians, who enjoyed the privilege of becoming consul so quickly. Further, one can deduce that Camerinus also was born 30 years before he became praetor, in the year 13, as that was the usual age patricians held that traditional Roman magistracy. It is also not uncontroversial that Camerinus was the son of Gaius Antistius Vetus, consul in 23. From his name Giuseppe Camodeca deduced that Camerinus' mother was the daughter of Quintus Sulpicius Camerinus, consul in AD 9, identifying her as Sulpicia. Camodeca also identified two men as his brothers: Gaius Antistius Vetus, ordinary consul in 50; and Lucius Antistius Vetus, ordinary consul in 55.

== Enigmas ==
Camerinus presents a number of problems in the little we know about him. First there is his praenomen Camerinus which is not one of the 20-odd traditional examples known; in fact, its only attested use as a praenomen only for this person. However, a number of Camerinus' contemporaries present unusual praenomina: Paullus Fabius Persicus (consul 34); the two men named Faustus Cornelius Sulla Lucullus (suffect consul 31), and his son Faustus Cornelius Sulla Felix, consul in 52.

But more problematic is the brevity of his tenure. Documents exist attesting him as consul for 15 and 23 March 46. However, the Fasti Teanenses, which reveals many details about the consuls of this period, omit all mention of Camerinus; it credits Sulpicius Camerinus with holding the office from the beginning of March through the end of June. A number of explanations have been proposed to explain Camerinus Antistius omission, but Nikolaus Pachowiak points out they are all unsatisfactory.

Pachowiak proposes that the two are the same man; he proposes that the consul's full name was Quintus Sulpicius Camerinus Antistius Vetus. Pachowiak remarks that it should not be a surprise that the literary tradition only knows him by his first three names, pointing to Galba and noting that Suetonius is the only literary source from which we learn the emperor had adopted the names Lucius Livius Ocella. While it would be the simplest solution -- this provides a pre-consular career for Sulpicius Camerinus, and a post-consular career for Antistius Vetus -- and there is no evidence against it, more evidence is needed before Pachowiak's identification is accepted as fact.

Political offices
Preceded by Decimus Valerius Asiaticus II as Ordinary consul	Suffect consul of the Roman Empire; 46 with Marcus Junius Silanus	Succeeded by Quintus Sulpicius Camerinus as Suffect consul
