= Lucius Aelius Lamia Plautius Aelianus =

1st century Roman senator

Lucius Aelius Lamia Plautius Aelianus (c. 45 – 81/96) was a Roman senator.

== Life ==
He was described by Brian W. Jones as "the most eminent of the consular victims" of Domitian. Juvenal used his family as representative of Domitian's most noble victims; Lamia was consul suffect in 80 with three different colleagues: Aulus Didius Gallus Fabricius Veiento, Quintus Aurelius Pactumeius Fronto, and Gaius Marius Marcellus Octavius Publius Cluvius Rufus.

A number of scholars have concluded that Lamia was most likely a son of Tiberius Plautius Silvanus Aelianus.

== Family ==
It has been conjectured that Lamia may have been married to Fabia Barbara, daughter of Quintus Fabius Barbarus Antonius Macer, since it has been surmised that Lamia had a daughter, referred to as Plautia, who married three times and gave birth to several prominent Romans and several of her descendants used "Fabia" and "Barbarus" as names.

He is known to have been married to Domitia Longina, a daughter of the general Gnaeus Domitius Corbulo and Cassia Longina. Longina may have born him one or two daughters and the consul of 116 Lucius Fundanius Lamia Aelianus was possibly their son, although it is also possible that Fundanius may have been Longina and Lamia's grandson through a daughter and her husband, a Lucius Fundanius, son of another Lucius Fundanius. The children would have been born before 71 when Domitian forced Lamia to divorce her.

Domitia was seduced by Domitian while his father Vespasian was still in Roman Egypt (70); Domitian afterwards forced Lamia to divorce her so he could have her for himself. Despite this, Lamia retained his sense of humor. Jones suspects it was his sense of humor, in the form of harmless jokes directed at the emperor, that led to his execution. Domitian was unable to handle personal criticism of any sort, and there was ample precedent for the laws of treason to be applied to writings of this kind.

== See also ==
- List of Roman consuls

Political offices
| Preceded by Titus Caesar Vespasianus VIII, and Caesar Domitianus VII as ordinary consuls | Suffect consul of the Roman Empire; 80 with Aulus Didius Gallus Fabricius Veiento; Quintus Aurelius Pactumeius Fronto; Gaius Marius Marcellus Octavius Publius Cluvius Rufus | Succeeded by Marcus Atilius Postumus Bradua, and Quintus Pompeius Trio as suffect consuls |
