= Helius (freedman) =

Prominent Roman freedman during the rule of Emperor Nero

Helius (died 68/69 AD) was a prominent freedman in the time of ancient Roman Emperor Nero. He and Patrobius exercised great and pernicious power and influence under Nero. Helius was the de facto ruler of Rome in the absence of Nero.

== Early career ==
According to Cassius Dio, Helius was an imperial freedman (libertus) of Claudius, later serving Nero.

== Nero's reign ==
On 13 October 54 AD, under the reign of the new emperor Nero (r. 54–68 AD; aged 16), Helius rose as the head of the imperial court and conducted business on behalf of the emperor.

=== 54 AD - The fall of Junius Silanus ===
In 54 AD, the first death under the new emperor was that of Junius Silanus, proconsul of Asia. Without Nero's knowledge, the murder was planned through the treachery of Agrippina because Silanus was the son of a great-grandson of Augustus. The murder was performed by Publius Egnatius Celer, a Roman knight, and Helius, men who had the charge of the emperor's domains in Asia. According to Tacitus, they gave the proconsul poison at a banquet, too openly to escape discovery.

=== 64 AD - Great Fire of Rome ===
In 64 AD, Helius acted as an agent on behalf of emperor Nero. On a trip to Naples, Nero left Helius in charge of Rome, with the full authority to confiscate, banish and execute men of all ranks without notifying Nero. The primary source for this period is Tacitus the Helius shifted from performing general administrative duties to function as viceroy for Nero.

In July 64 AD, the Great Fire of Rome was a major event where Helius in the position as procurator would have been in the inner circle of the familia Caesaris.

=== 66 AD - The Viceroy ===
In September 66 AD, Emperor Nero went to Greece to participate in the Olympic Games. Helius became the de facto viceroy of Rome during the absence of the emperor, holding the "power of the keys" to the city. The keys symbolized stewardship (dispensatio), and meant that Helios had total control over the gates, treasury, and administration.

=== 67 AD - The Olympic Games ===
In 67 AD, Nero was present at the Olympic games in Greece. During this period, Cassius Dio reports that Helius had Quintus Sulpicius Camerinus Pythicus executed because he refused to give up the name Pythicus, which Helius claimed was an insult against Nero's victory in the Pythian Games. The Jewish War became a serious military commitment. Helius recalled emperor Nero to Rome in the winter of 67–68, forcing Nero to postpone his other ventures along with the news of Vindex rising which finally put an end to his plans.

"During the absence of Nero, Rome was controlled by a freedman named Helius and by Tigellinus' colleague Nymphidius, who expanded his control of the imperial guard. After Nero's return at the end of the winter of 67/68, Tigellinus was obviously the lesser of the two prefects."

Nero became more and more insulated by flatterers and more convinced of his musical talents, committed to go to Greece and neglected Helius' warnings about disaffection at home, which would rise to a climax with the Vindex's rebellion.

=== 68 AD - Rebellion ===
In January/February 68 AD, Nero was forced to return to Rome as Helius faced political unrest and the impending revolt of Vindex.

== Galba's reign ==
=== 68 AD - Execution ===
After Nero’s suicide in June 68 AD, the usurping emperor Galba (June 68 - January 69) moved to purge the most hated figures of the previous regime to consolidate his own popularity and "purify" the administration. In a series of arrests, Helios and other prominent freedmen such as Patrobius, Polyclitus and Petinus were arrested. Cassius Dio (Roman History 64.3) states that Galba ordered them to be led in chains throughout the entire city as a public display of the new order's justice. Plutarch (Life of Galba 17) describes the public's joy of seeing these men, who had "filled the world with so many evils" led to their deaths. They were publicly executed (likely by beheading or strangulation) late in 68 AD, before Galba himself was assassinated in January 15, 69 AD.
