= Quintus Sulpicius Camerinus Peticus =

1st century AD Roman senator and consul

Quintus Sulpicius Camerinus Peticus (died 67) was a Roman senator during the reign of Nero.

== Life ==
Camerinus served as suffect consul in 46 with Marcus Junius Silanus as his colleague, and as proconsul of Africa from 56 to 57.

Camerinus was a member of the gens Sulpicia. He was also a member of the Arval Brethren: its records, the Acta Fratrum Arvalium attest to his attendance from May 58 through April 63, and to his presidency of the Board of Sacrifice in 60. Camerinus was charged with extortion but was acquitted by the Emperor Nero. In 67, he was killed with his son Quintus Sulpicius Camerinus Pythicus by Helius while Nero was in Achaea, on the grounds that he refused to give up his cognomen which "allegedly constituted a slight against Nero's victories at the Pythian games." Peticus also had a daughter called Sulpicia Praetextata who married the consul of 64, Marcus Licinius Crassus Frugi.

== Question of identity ==
The discovery of records attesting that Camerinus Antistius Vetus was suffect consul for a few weeks in March posed a challenge to the experts. Giuseppe Camodeca explained the brief tenure of Antistius Vetus as caused by an early death; But Nikolaus Pachowiak objects to this explanation, and suggests that the two men -- Antistius Vetus and Quintus Sulpicius -- are the same man. Pachowiak remarks that it should not be a surprise that the literary tradition only knows him by his first three names, pointing to Galba and noting that Suetonius is the only literary source from which we learn the emperor had adopted the names Lucius Livius Ocella. While it would be the simplest solution -- this provides a proconsular career for Sulpicius Camerinus, and a post-consular career for Antistius Vetus -- and there is no evidence against it, more evidence is needed before Pachowiak's identification is accepted as fact.

Political offices
Preceded by Camerinus Antistius Vetus as Suffect consul	Suffect consul of the Roman Empire; 46 with Marcus Junius Silanus	Succeeded by Decimus Laelius Balbus as Suffect consul
Preceded by Marcus Pompeius Silvanus Staberius Flavianus	Proconsul of Africa; 56 – 57	Succeeded by Gnaeus Hosidius Geta
