= Quintus Aurelius Pactumeius Fronto =

1st century Roman senator and first consul from North Africa

Quintus Aurelius Pactumeius Fronto was a Roman senator active during the first century AD. He was suffect consul for the nundinium September-October 80 as the colleague of Lucius Aelius Lamia Plautius Aelianus.

Fronto is the earliest documented person from North Africa to accede to the Roman consulate, although his brother Quintus Aurelius Pactumeius Clemens, the date of whose consulship is not known but is around the same time, could be earlier; a stamp on an amphora found in Pompeii dates the ceramic to the consulate of "Marcellus and Pactumeius". The mystery lies in an inscription from Cirta set up by Pactumeia, daughter of one of these brothers, but the name of her father is damaged, and the traces could fit either man. Both Fronto and his brother Clemens are known solely from inscriptions.

Both brothers were born into the equestrian class, and thus homines novi. Mireille Corbier, in her monograph on financial administrators of the Roman Empire, explains their gentilica as the result of a testamentary adoption by a Quintus Aurelius. Both were adlected into the Senate as praetorians by Vespasian and Titus in 73–74. Fronto was appointed curator of the aerarium militare presumably for three years between the years 75 and 79. Corbier remarks on the remarkable speed of Fronto's advancement: he needed only six years to achieve consular rank after being admitted to the Senate. The lives of both brothers lack documentation after their consulates.

Corbier believes Pactumeia was the daughter of Pactumeius Fronto, while his brother Clemens is the grandfather of Publius Pactumeius Clemens, consul in 138.

Political offices
Preceded by Aulus Didius Gallus Fabricius Veiento, and Lucius Aelius Lamia Plautius Aelianus as ordinary consuls	Suffect consul of the Roman Empire; 80 with Lucius Aelius Lamia Plautius Aelianus	Succeeded by Gaius Marius Marcellus Octavius Publius Cluvius Rufus, and Lucius Aelius Lamia Plautius Aelianus
