= Lucius Tampius Flavianus =

1st century Roman senator, consul and governor

Lucius Tampius Flavianus was a Roman senator who was consul twice, as a suffect consul. In his first consulship, whose date is no longer known, his colleague was Publius Fabius Firmanus. Flavianus stayed on the periphery of the civil war fought during the Year of the Four Emperors. Under the victor of the war, Vespasian, he served his second consulship, with Marcus Pompeius Silvanus Staberius Flavianus as colleague, in the third nundinium of the year 76.

== Life ==
Flavianus' career is not yet known prior to his first consulship. An inscription from Fundi records that following that office he was proconsular governor of an unknown province, then governor of Pannonia. Pliny the Elder tells us the public province was Africa. As for the date of his governorship, while Ronald Syme attempted to show it was in the years 70/71, R.D. Milns notes "most scholars are in agreement that a Neronian dating is more likely."

From the history of the Year of the Four Emperors, it is clear that he was governor of Pannonia in the year 69. He was likely governor in the previous year, 68--both Tacitus and the inscription from Fundi mention that Flavianus achieved a military victory, likely beyond the middle Danube, for which he later received triumphal ornaments.

His actions in the chaotic year of 69 are the best-known portion of his life. Here Tacitus describes him as "rich and advanced in year[s]", and was influenced by the provincial procurator, Cornelius Fuscus, implying that Flavianus was unqualified to be governor of the province. This is an odd charge to make, considering Flavianus' victory beyond the Rhine the previous year. Flavianus was called to Rome early that year; the records of the Arval Brethren note he was admitted to their order on 26 February 69. Milns suggests this was done at Otho's direction, for "Otho needed every friend he could obtain", although he admits that the Arval Brethren "was not regarded as one of the more prestigious priestly colleges". Upon returning to Pannonia, he found the soldiers of his province suspicious of him, in part from his journey to Rome, in part because of his caution in picking a side in the ongoing civil war. Later that year, when the legions of Pannonia declared for Vespasian and marched forth to battle the soldiers who had sided with Vitellius, shortly after reaching northern Italy and having taken positions before the city of Verona, they turned on Flavianus and attempted to murder him. First Marcus Aponius Saturninus tried to reason with the troops to save Flavianus, and when he failed general Marcus Antonius Primus intervened to protect Flavianus. When speeches failed to quiet the men, Antonius resorted to trickery and ordered Flavianus loaded with chains and imprisoned. However, the men saw through this deception and attempted to overrun the tribunal whence Antonius spoke. Antonius then stood before them with drawn sword, announcing they would need to kill him before they would lay hands on Flavianus. At this point the mutiny abated, and under the cover of darkness Flavianus was able to flee the camp. As he proceeded forth, Tacitus tells us he was met by a messenger bearing orders relieving him of his command.

Although Flavianus sat out the rest of the civil war, he was treated honorably by Vespasian, who awarded him the triumphal ornaments mentioned above. He was appointed curator aquarum, or overseer of the aqueducts of Rome from 73 to 74. This was followed a few years later with a second consulate. His life, after this point, is unknown, as is the date of his death.

Political offices
Preceded by Caesar Domitianus IV, and Titus V	Suffect Consul of the Roman Republic; 76 with Marcus Pompeius Silvanus Staberius Flavianus	Succeeded by Galeo Tettienus Petronianus, and Marcus Fulvius Gillo as consules suffecti
