= Gaius Terentius Tullius Geminus =

1st century AD Roman senator and consul

Gaius Terentius Tullius Geminus was a Roman senator of the early Roman Empire, who flourished under the reign of Claudius. He was suffect consul in the nundinium of September-December 46 as the colleague of Marcus Junius Silanus. It is inconclusive if a poet named Tullius Geminus, whose poems are included in the Palatine Anthology is the same man.

Although Steven Rutledge dates the start of his senatorial career to the reign of Tiberius, the earliest attested event in Geminus' life is his suffect consulship. He is attested as governor of Moesia in the 50s; a copy of a letter he wrote to the inhabitants of Histria upholding their rights to the mouth of the Danube was preserved in a set of inscriptions known as the Horothesia Laberiou Maximou. Geminus appears in the Annales of Tacitus, as prosecuting Aulus Didius Gallus Fabricius Veiento at the direction of the emperor Nero for allegedly writing a collection of lampoons on senators and pontiffs called "Codicils"; Veiento was found guilty, banished from Italy, and copies of the pamphlets burned.

Political offices
Preceded by Decimus Laelius Balbus, and Marcus Junius Silanus as suffect consuls	Suffect consul of the Roman Empire; 46 with Marcus Junius Silanus	Succeeded by Claudius IV, and Lucius Vitellius III as Ordinary consuls
