= Patrobius =

Prominent Roman freedman during the rule of Emperor Nero

Patrobius (d. 69) was a prominent freedman in the time of ancient Roman Emperor Nero. He and Helius exercised great and pernicious power and influence under Nero. In 66 AD he put on a luxurious show at Puteoli to honor the Armenian king Tiridates. After Galba came to power, Patrobius was executed along with several other of Nero's favorites (Helius, Polyclitus, and Petinus). They were marched in chains around the city before they were publicly executed.

According to Plutarch, after Galba's assassination in 69 AD the emperor's severed head was given to Patrobius' former servants, who heaped insults on it and cast it into the "Sestertion" (probably the Sessorium), "where those under condemnation of the emperors were put to death."
