= Gaius Stertinius Xenophon =

Roman physician who served the Roman Emperor, Claudius (c. 10 BC – 54 AD)

Gaius Stertinius Xenophon (c. 10 BC – 54 AD), often referred to in ancient literature as simply Xenophon, was a physician who served the Roman Emperor, Claudius, the fourth member of the Julio-Claudian dynasty. Xenophon is primarily remembered for his suspected involvement and collaboration in the murder of Claudius by poison.

Xenophon was born on the island of Kos, where he trained as a physician before voyaging to Rome. Once there, he began to practice medicine, and as his reputation as a physician grew, Xenophon became very wealthy. He lived well, owning a manor situated on the Caelian Hill.

Later, Xenophon spent time serving in the military, and it was through this participation in the armed forces that Claudius first became aware of Xenophon's renown as a physician. As a result, Xenophon become Claudius' personal physician.

Xenophon died in 54 AD. How Xenophon died is unknown; whether it was coincidence that he died in the same year as Claudius' death, or whether his death was related to the incident, is not documented.

== Poisoning of Claudius ==
Xenophon remains a suspect in the alleged poisoning of Claudius on 12–13 October (the date is disputed), as he was one of the few people who spent a large part of the day in close contact with the emperor. In addition, he attended the banquet at which Claudius is thought to have consumed the poison and, according to several sources, he took Claudius to his chamber after the emperor had passed out. If Xenophon was involved, what he actually did to the ailing Claudius in his bedroom remains a source of debate. Those who claim that the poison was not immediately fatal suggest that Xenophon used a poisoned feather or poisoned gruel, pretending to force Claudius to regurgitate his stomach contents, but in reality completing the murder.

== See also ==
- Locusta - another suspect in the murder.
- Halotus - Claudius's official taster. Another possible suspect.
