= Decimus Laelius Balbus (consul 46) =

1st century AD Roman senator and delator (informer)

Decimus Laelius Balbus was a Roman senator and delator or informer, active during the Principate. He was suffect consul in the nundinium of July-August 46 as the colleague of Marcus Junius Silanus.

His father has been identified as Decimus Laelius Balbus, consul in 6 BC. Balbus himself first enters history when in AD 37 he accused Acutia, the former wife of Publius Vitellius, of maiestas. Following her conviction, when the Senate voted on his reward, the plebeian tribune Junius Otho interposed with his veto. According to Tacitus, this gave rise to a feud between Vitellius and Otho which ended in Otho's banishment. That same year, Balbus was accused along with Albucilla, "notorious for the number of her lovers", was deprived of his rank as senator and exiled to an island, which was received "with intense satisfaction, as Balbus was noted for his savage eloquence and his eagerness to assail the innocent."

Apparently Balbus regained his status as senator for he became consul afterwards, although Steven Rutledge raises the possibility that it is his son who was suffect consul.

At some point in his career Balbus was involved in a famous legal case, the pro Voluseno Catulo, concerning Lucius Volusenus Catulus. While we know from Quintillian the names of his defenders, who include Gnaeus Domitius Afer and Gaius Passienus Crispus as well as Balbus, we know nothing of the charges, the verdict, or the prosecutors. Although one authority dates the case to before Balbus' banishment, Rutledge believes that since Balbus was restored to his former status "there is no reason not to attribute it to the reign of Gaius or the early part of Claudius' reign."

Laelius Balbus is known to have a daughter Laelia, a Vestal Virgin who died in the year 64.

Political offices
Preceded by Quintus Sulpicius Camerinus, and Marcus Junius Silanus	Suffect consul of the Roman Empire; 46 with Marcus Junius Silanus	Succeeded by Gaius Terentius Tullius Geminus, and Marcus Junius Silanus
