= Palea Kameni =

Island within the Santorini Caldera, Greece

Nickname: "Old Burnt Island"
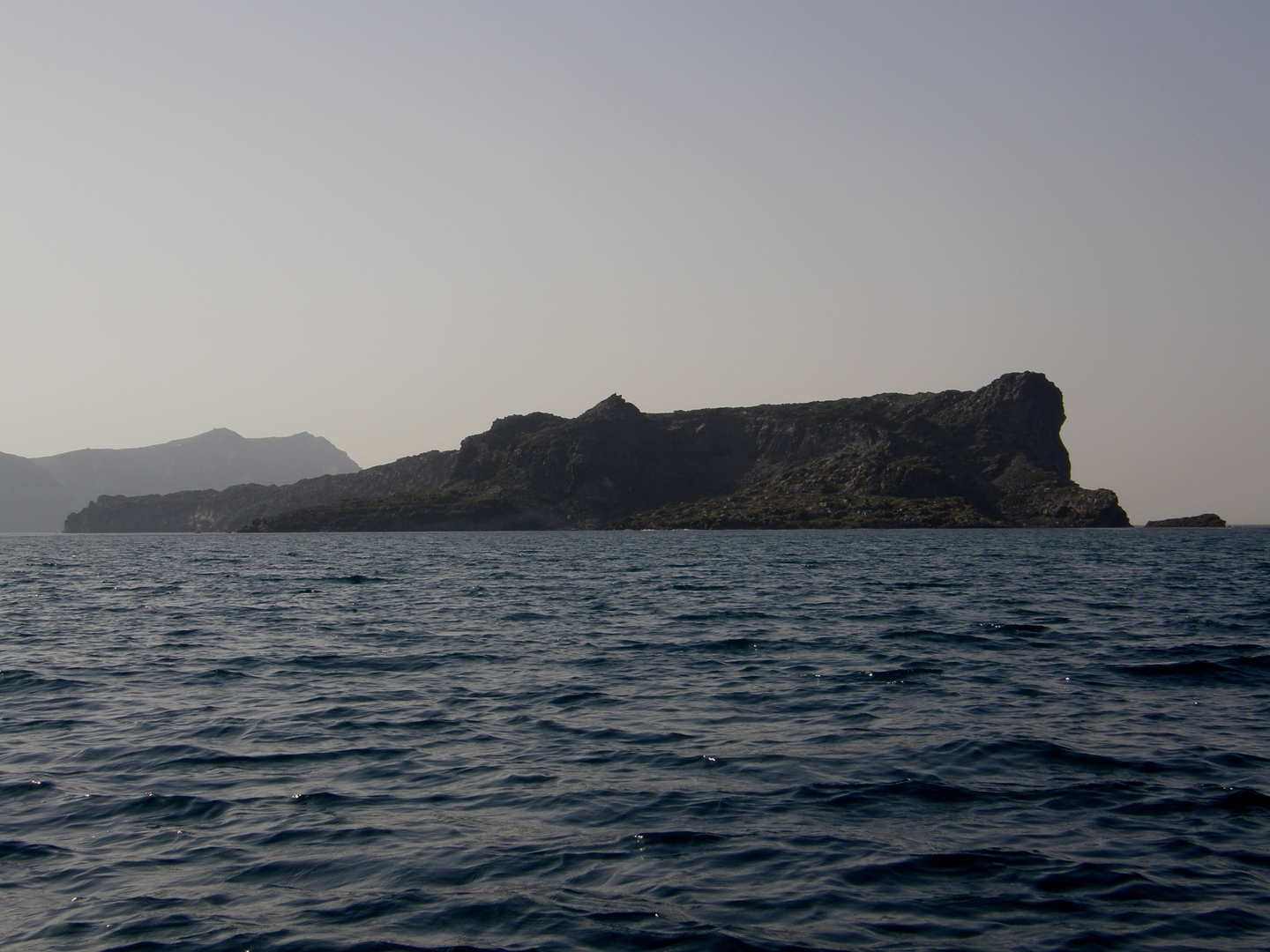
- Interactive map of Palea Kameni

Geography
- Location: Mediterranean Sea
- Coordinates: 36°23′51″N 25°22′46″E
- Total islands: 1

Administration
- Greece

Palea Kameni, also known as Palia Kameni, is a volcanic island within the Santorini Caldera. The island was formed by a series of volcanic eruptions that formed large deposits of pumice and dacite lavas. The island's name translates to "Old Burnt Island". Palea Kameni is a private island, it was inhabited until it was bought in 1899 and sold in 1975.

== History ==
Palea Kameni was formed by a series of eruptions between 197 BCE and 47 CE. The appearance of the island was noted in the journal of Roman historian Cassius Dio, who wrote "This year [47 CE] a small islet, hitherto unknown, made an appearance close to the island of Thera." No further activity is known from the island until 726, when the island suffered a submarine explosive eruption of pumice, and lava. Volcanic activity then ceased again until the 1570s, when the development of Palea's sister island Nea Kameni caused increased volcanic activity to be reported. Other ancient authors note that it arose from the sea in 197 BCE and was given the name Hiera (Ancient Greek: Ἱερά), a name frequently given in antiquity to volcanic mountains. This fact is stated by Eusebius, Justin, Strabo, and Plutarch. It is related by Strabo that flames burst out of the sea for four days, and that an island was formed 12 stadia or 1.5 miles (2.4 km) in circumference.

The island lies to the southwest of Nea Kameni. Though the island is for the most part uninhabited, several structures (including a small church) are located on the island. Due to the lack of a good harbor, most recreational watercraft do not stop at the island, though tourists can swim to the island from nearby Nea Kameni. Like the larger island to its east, Palea Kameni is sparsely vegetated with succulent plants. A herd of goats is present on the island, as is a single inhabitant, Sostice Arvanitis. The island also contains a hot spring.

== Features ==
The Santorini volcano has many features, including a caldera, craters, cliffs, and volcanic beaches.

- Caldera: A vast crater that stretches along the west coast of the island. Formed by a massive volcanic eruption thousands of years ago. Covers a large part of the island.
- Craters: Located on the small islands of Palea Kameni and Nea Kameni. Made of black lava.
- Cliffs: Sheer volcanic cliffs that jut out from the sea. Topped with white houses and churches. Offer views of the volcano and neighboring islands. Volcanic beaches Created by the volcano's eruptions.
- Fumarolic activity: The type of volcanic activity that consists of steam, smoke, or gases that escape from vents or fissures. Can be seen from the surface and felt in certain spots.
- Hot springs: Thermal waters are commonly several degrees warmer than the surrounding sea.
- Santorini volcanic complex: Includes the Christiana islands and the Kolumbo volcano. The current configuration of the islands is attributed to the Bronze-age eruption.
