= Marcus Pompeius Silvanus Staberius Flavianus =

1st century Roman senator, consul, proconsul and provincial governor

Pompeius Silvanus, fully Marcus Pompeius Silvanus Staberius Flavinus or Flavianus (died 83), was a Roman senator who was consul twice.

Werner Eck has stated that he was from Arelate, but certainly came from Gallia Narbonensis; Silvanus was the son of the senator M. Pompeius M.f. Priscus, known from an unpublished senatus consultum of AD 20. The additional three nomina of his name -- "Silvanus Staberius Flavianus" -- is due to either a testamentary adoption, or comes from his mother's family.

The first time he was consul was as suffect for the nundinium of 45 as the colleague of Aulus Antoninus Rufus. This was followed a little more than ten years later as Proconsul of Africa from 56 to 58. After returning to Rome Silvanus was charged for actions related to his governance but was acquitted by the Emperor.

During the Year of the Four Emperors, Silvanus was appointed governor of Dalmatia by Galba. Tacitus describes him as "rich and advanced in years", which was likely what Galba wanted: a complacent non-entity overseeing an important province. However, he proved pliable by the legatus legionis Lucius Annius Bassus, who encouraged him to support Vespasian at the critical moment. In reward for his loyalty, Flavianus was appointed to a second consulship for the nundinium of either March-April or May-June 76 as the colleague of Lucius Tampius Flavianus.

An inscription has been recovered in Croatia attests that Silvanus appointed several individuals to arbitrate a boundary dispute between Alveria (modern Bjelina) and Asseria (modern Podgrađe).

Silvanus was designated as consul a third time for the year 83, but died before he could assume office. Tactius mentions that Silvanus had no children.

Political offices
| Preceded by Marcus Vinicius II, and Titus Statilius Taurus Corvinus as consules ordinarii | Suffect Consul of the Roman Empire; 45 with Aulus Antonius Rufus | Succeeded by Decimus Valerius Asiaticus II, and Marcus Junius Silanus Torquatus as consules ordinarii |
| Preceded by Caesar Domitianus IV, and Titus V | Suffect Consul of the Roman Empire; 76 with Lucius Tampius Flavianus II | Succeeded by Galeo Tettienus Petronianus, and Marcus Fulvius Gillo as consules suffecti |
| Preceded by Titus Statilius Taurus | Proconsul of Africa; 56 – 58 | Succeeded by Quintus Sulpicius Camerinus Peticus |
