= Halotus =

Servant and butler of Claudius; suspect in his possible murder

- Born: c. 20–30 AD
- Died: c. 70–80 AD (~50 years)
- Occupation(s): Food taster and butler
- Known for: Servant to Claudius, suspect in his murder

Halotus (c. 20–30 AD – c. 70–80 AD) was a eunuch servant to the Roman Emperor Claudius, the fourth member of the Julio-Claudian dynasty. He served Claudius as a taster and as a chief steward; it was because of his occupation, which entailed close contact with Claudius, that he is and was a suspect in the murder of the latter by poison. Along with Agrippina the Younger, the wife of Claudius, Halotus was considered one of the most likely to have committed the murder, although speculation by ancient historians suggest that he may have been working under orders of Agrippina.

Following the death of Claudius, much public outrage ensued, and there was a clear desire in the general public that Halotus and several other suspects (such as Tigellinus, another servant who served Claudius), be executed. Nero, who acceded to the throne, allowed Halotus to continue as chief steward and taster; Halotus served Nero until the latter's death in 68, and Galba's assumption of the throne.

Shortly after Galba became Emperor, he bestowed upon Halotus an "important procuratorship". This allowed Halotus to become a wealthy man. Halotus was still unpopular, and Galba's reason for giving such a well-paying job is not recorded; Galba often made decisions that were not well-liked by the public but which Galba often claimed were "for the economic good".

Halotus died close to the end of the century, his public reputation somewhat restored after his rise in stature and wealth. His date of death is not mentioned by ancient historians of the time, such as Tacitus or Suetonius, who were also some of the main recorders of the events around Claudius' death and the political trauma that followed. Whether Halotus was involved in the murder of Claudius and to what extent remains an unresolved point, as do many other aspects related to Claudius' passing.

== Servant ==
Halotus worked as a servant for Claudius and also held the position of official taster, an occupation which entailed his tasting of a portion of every meal Claudius ate each day for poison. Tasters also worked to detect less sinister problems with the Emperor's meal, such as whether the food was fit to be consumed.

As the Emperor's personal taster, Halotus would accompany Claudius to every banquet and dinner and as chief steward, he would have been with Claudius and his family for the majority of the time. Thus he could have formed a relationship with Agrippina the Younger, suggesting the possibility of their collaboration in poisoning Claudius. It also meant that he would have been aware of details such as the Emperor's food preferences, his meal times and his schedule, making it easier for him to commit the murder.

Halotus was also known to have been a eunuch. There are many possible reasons for this but the most likely is related to the possibility of sexual contact between servant and master; a prohibition against sexual contact between royalty and servants, guards and slaves was not uncommon in many parts of the world during Halotus' era and it was thought that male castration would prevent this. Halotus may have been required to submit to castration in order to hold his position.

== Poisoning of Claudius ==
Halotus is primarily remembered for his suspected involvement in the conspiracy and poisoning of Emperor Claudius on 13 October (times of death are in dispute; see below) 54 AD. It is possible that Claudius died of natural causes,^{[I]} and the actual manner of the poisoning, in regards to which poison may have been used, in which food it could have been hidden, etc., remains unclear. It is considered most likely, considering the writings of various ancient historians, that the poison was concealed in mushrooms (as Claudius was known to have been particularly fond of them), and Agrippina the Younger, Claudius' wife, is thought to have been the most likely to have instigated the murder or to have been the lead conspirator in the plot to overthrow Claudius.

Halotus, as the Emperor's official taster, would probably have had a role in the plot, deceiving Claudius into believing the food was safe to consume. He is a prime suspect because he would have had access to everything eaten by the Emperor on the night of his death. It has been suggested that Halotus may have been the murderer but was working under orders of Agrippina. While it is uncertain whether Halotus would have had anything to gain from the death of the Emperor, Agrippina's political and personal advantage gained by the death of her husband was evident; with Claudius dead, Nero, Agrippina's biological son, would be able to claim the throne. It was also known that the animosity between Agrippina and Claudius had grown during the months preceding the suspected homicide. Other notable suspects included Locusta, a professional poisoner, and Xenophon, Claudius' royal physician, who, in line with the suggestion that the poison was not immediately fatal, is said to have carried an ailing Claudius out of the banquet, taken him to his room and forced a poisoned feather into his mouth on the pretence of encouraging him to regurgitate. Others say Xenophon used poisoned gruel.

Other details about the poisoning have always been in dispute. While some argue that Claudius was in Rome, others claim he was in Sinuessa on the night he was poisoned. Whether one ingestion of poison was only enough to cause Claudius to fall ill and whether a second dose was given to kill him is also debated.^{[II]}

The time of death is also much discussed; one version claims that the poison was so potent that he died instantly, while another says that he endured agony until dawn of the following day. It has been suggested that Claudius may have died as late as noon on 13 October.

== Aftermath ==
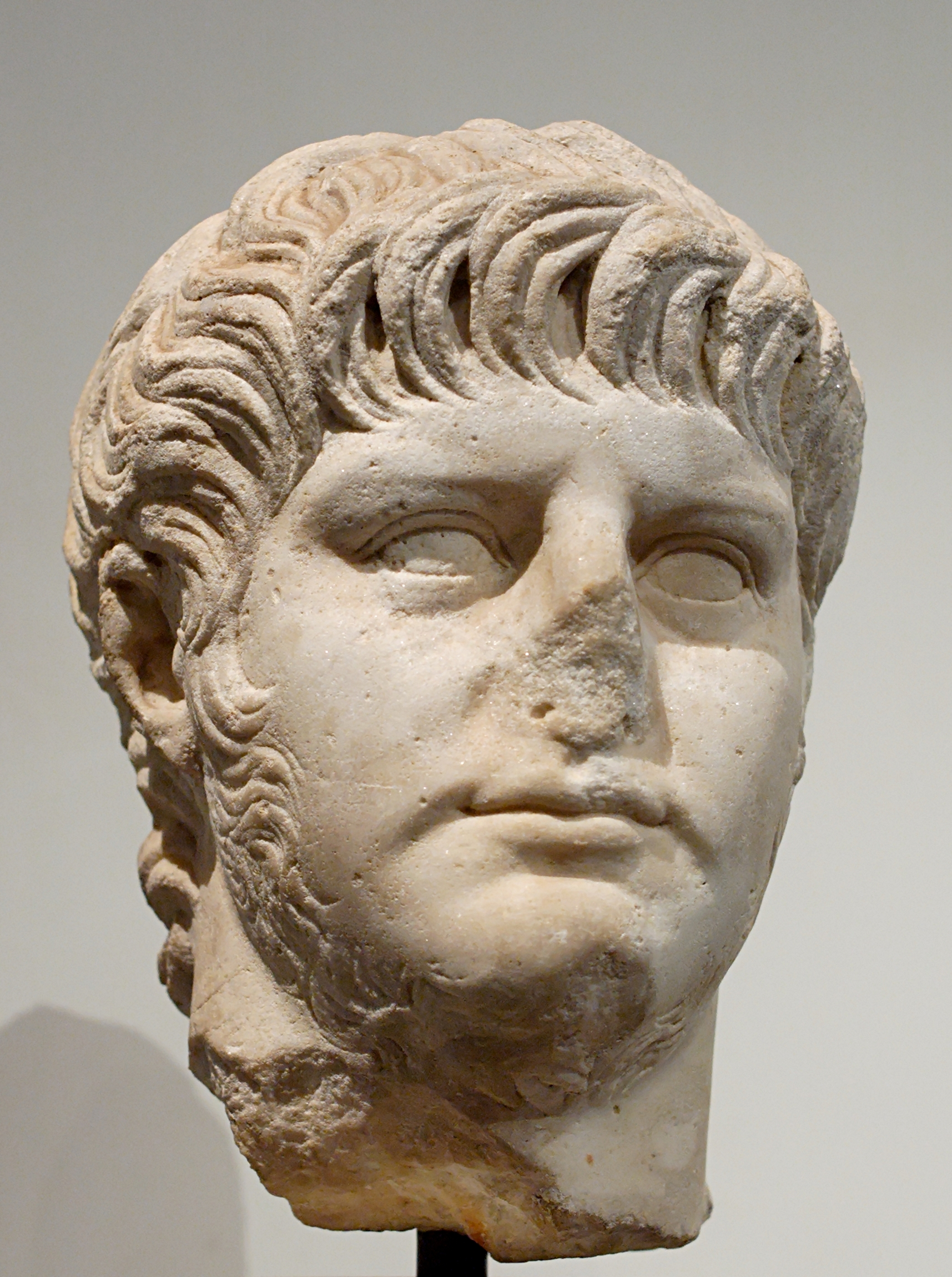
Marble bust of Nero (ruled from 54 to 68), located in the Antiquarium of the Palatine.

=== Under Nero ===
For a while, it was pretended that Claudius was still alive, with all of those involved in the plot (including Halotus) undertaking their normal duties. This was done so that arrangements for Nero's accession could be secure. The news that Claudius was merely sick rather than dead spread widely and Agrippina making requests "on Claudius' behalf" further fooled the people into believing the Emperor lived. After all of the preparations for Nero's accession had been made, the death was revealed to the Roman people. Claudius was cremated, and his ashes were interred in the Mausoleum of Augustus on 24 October, 54 AD, ten days after his death. Despite the great political tumult Claudius' passing caused, Nero and the Senate very quickly deified Claudius and Nero took the throne, just as Agrippina had wanted. at the young age of sixteen. The usurpation was politically easy for Nero; Claudius' will had specified that either Nero or Britannicus should take the throne following his death. Nero swiftly took firm control over an unsettled public; all but Claudius' most rigid and unmoving supporters became Nero's men after only a short period. This can be at least partially attributed to Nero's very well known opinions of Claudius, who was his adoptive father; Nero often politically and publicly criticised and even insulted the late Claudius and many Claudian laws and policies were disregarded and abandoned under Nero's reasoning that Claudius was simply too stupid and senile to be given any consideration. Nero responded to allegations of poisoned mushrooms being used to kill Claudius, by naming the fungus "the food of the gods", lending further credence to the idea that mushrooms were used.

Much public outrage resulted from the mystery shrouding Claudius' death and the death itself; there was a clear desire among the people of Rome that anyone suspected in Claudius' murder be executed and this included Halotus; he was not killed, and Nero allowed him to retain his position throughout his reign.^{[III]}

=== Under Galba ===
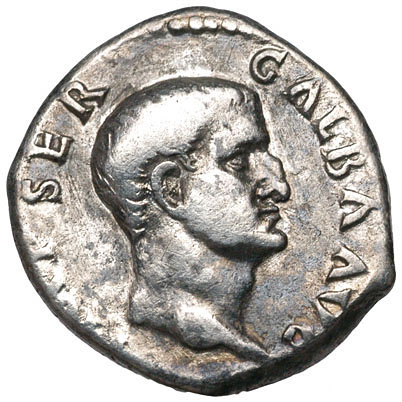
Galba, the first of the four emperors of the Year of the Four Emperors (68) seen on a coin.

In 68 AD,^{[IV]}, Nero's successor Galba, despite public feeling, rewarded Halotus with a procuratorship. Galba ordered an edict relating to Tigellinus, another servant who had possibly been involved in the murder of Claudius and whose death was also being called for among the Romans, rebuking the public for their harshness and outrage.

Galba may have chosen to award Halotus the lucrative procuratorship for any number of reasons; during his reign, Galba was known for making often unpopular political and economical actions, supposedly for what was, at least in Galba's mind, the financial health of the city. Halotus' great rise in status, and his subsequent prosperity, may have been in some way beneficial in Galba's eyes. Less specifically, the move would certainly have had some degree of benefit for Galba in some way, whether indirectly, or directly, economically or financially.

The office was described by Suetonius as "an important procuratorship" but few other details relating to the actual occupation were specified. Mentions of Halotus' receiving of the procuratorship include:

This person [Halotus] also survived Nero, and was promoted by Galba to a wealthy procuratorship

— Tacitus

Why, when the Roman people called for the execution of Tigellinus and Halotus, he [Galba] saved these two alone out of all Nero's agents, even though they were perhaps the worst of the lot. What is more, he gave Halotus an important procuratorship....

— Suetonius

Why Halotus in particular was chosen for such a high-paid position is unclear. Why Halotus was even spared is also unclear, as almost all of Nero's former servants were killed on Galba's assumption of the throne, as Suetonius notes above.

As noted in the first quote above, the procuratorship was a "wealthy" one, leading to the possibility that the job involved tax collection.

== Death ==
Halotus died sometime in the latter part of the 1st century. At the time of his death, he still held the procuratorship that he had been granted by Galba. He kept this position despite Galba's unseating very soon after it was bestowed and the political uproars of The Year of the Four Emperors. At the time of his death, Halotus' public reputation had been at least partially restored and he had accumulated some degree of wealth after he had been cleared by Galba. Details relating to his death are not recorded in any of the writings of ancient historians, and neither are any specific dates.

== See also ==
- Julio-Claudian family tree - Claudius' family tree
- Assassination
- Food poisoning

== Notes ==
I Scramuzza (1940) pp. 92–93 says that tradition makes every Emperor the victim of foul play, so it cannot be known certainly if Claudius was truly murdered. Levick (1990) pp. 76–77. raises the possibility that Claudius was killed by the stress of fighting with Agrippina over the succession, but concludes that the timing makes murder the most likely cause.

II This has been suggested because there were historical accounts reporting that, in regards to Claudius actually accepting the food laced with the lethal poison, things did not go exactly to plan; this could imply a variety of things: Claudius might first have touched the poisoned food and licked his fingers, or might otherwise only have consumed a portion of the dose of poison needed to be lethal. Those who implicate that a second dose was required claim that he fell into a stupor, threw up, woke up, only to be administered another dose that was then lethal.

III Nero's decision to allow Halotus to live and keep his job may have been influenced by a variety of factors. The most important of these factors was that the execution of Halotus, or indeed anyone else closely involved, for the murder of Claudius, may have put the plot to secure Nero's seat of power at risk, when Halotus was so close to Claudius, and could so easily have worked with Agrippina and others to poison the late Emperor. It would have made Halotus, as chief steward and taster, look like an accomplice or a witness to the or in the collaboration to poison Claudius, and all those involved would have preferred to keep the matter quiet than to arouse public suspicion in the new administration, and the way that the new administration had come into force.

IV Noted as the year Nero died, and the year preceding the politically unstable year 69 AD, the Year of the Four Emperors: Galba, Otho, Vitellius, and Vespasian.
