= Marcus Junius Silanus (consul 46) =

Roman consul and governor (AD 14–54)

Marcus Junius Silanus (AD 14–54) was a Roman senator.

== Biography ==
He was the eldest son of Marcus Junius Silanus Torquatus and Aemilia Lepida. His mother was the great-granddaughter of the emperor Augustus. As a member of the imperial family, Silanus could therefore be considered a possible candidate for the succession. Silanus was born the same year his great-great-grandfather, Augustus, died.

Although he was honoured with a consulship by the Emperor Claudius in 46, and served as proconsular governor of Asia, Silanus did not survive the death of that Emperor. Although Tacitus exonerates Nero of Silanus' death, the 'first crime of the new principate,' the historian casts Agrippina, Nero's mother, as the architect of the murder, on the grounds that she feared that Silanus would avenge his brother's death, of which she was the perpetrator. As with Claudius, poison was the means to Silanus' end; the epitomator of Dio Cassius' Roman History tells us that Agrippina sent Silanus the same poison which she gave her late husband; and Tacitus informs us that the lethal drug was administered by a Roman of the Equestrian class named Publius Celerius, with the aid of a freedman named Helius. The pair committed the crime openly, and the province of Asia eventually prosecuted Celerius for this deed; moreover, according to Tacitus, Nero saw to it that the prosecution was delayed to such an extent that Celerius died of old age.

Silanus' son, Lucius Junius Silanus Torquatus, whom Tacitus calls a young man of moderation (modesta iuventa), was considered a threat on similar grounds as his father had been, and informers soon invented a conspiracy implicating him and his aunt Junia Lepida on charges of magic rites and incest. Upon being exiled to Bari, he was set upon by a centurion and some guards. Young Silanus, however, did not open his veins, when invited to do so; he went down fighting with his fists, and Tacitus notes that the centurion was forced to run him through with his sword; his fatal wound, according to the historian, was in front.

== Footnotes ==
Political offices
Preceded by Aulus Antonius Rufus; Marcus Pompeius Silvanus Staberius Flavianus as suffect consuls	Roman consul 46 with Decimus Valerius Asiaticus II; Camerinus Antistius Vetus; Quintus Sulpicius Camerinus Peticus; Decimus Laelius Balbus; Gaius Terentius Tullius Geminus	Succeeded by Claudius IV; Lucius Vitellius III as ordinary consuls
