= Polyclitus (freedman) =

1st century AD Roman freedman of emperor Nero

Polyclitus was an influential freedman in the imperial court of the Roman emperor Nero.

== Biography ==
=== Reign of Nero ===
==== Britannia ====
He was sent to Britain in 60 or 61 AD to head an enquiry in the aftermath of the rebellion of Boudica. As a result the governor, Gaius Suetonius Paulinus, was relieved of his command and replaced by Publius Petronius Turpilianus.

=== Reign of Galba ===
==== Death ====
Polyclitus was put to death by Galba in 68, due to his high influence, as a part of the political purge that occurred after the change of emperors.

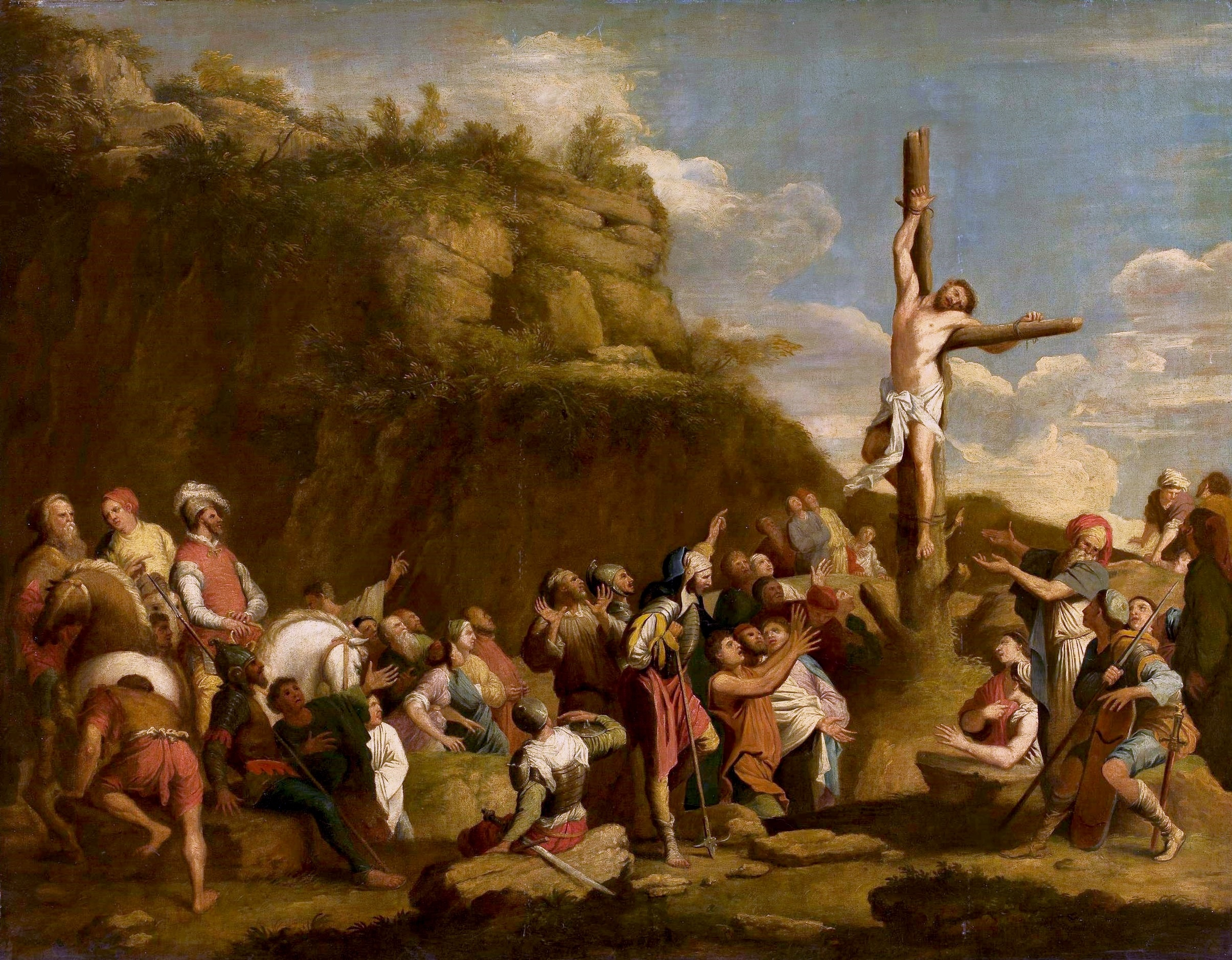
Crucifixion of Polyclitus, by Salvator Rosa
