= Roman naming conventions =

Over 1400 years the Romans and other peoples of Italy employed a system of names which were different from the personal names used by other cultures in Europe, consisting of a combination of a personal and a family name. Although conventionally referred to as the tria nomina, the combination of praenomen, nomen, and cognomen that have come to be regarded as the basic elements of the classical Roman name-form in fact represent a continuous process of development, from at least the 7th century BC – 7th century AD. The names that developed as part of this system became a defining characteristic of Roman civilization, and although the system itself fell out of use during the Early Middle Ages, the names themselves had a profound influence on the development of European naming practices, and many continue to influence modern languages.

== Overview ==
The distinguishing feature of Roman nomenclature was the use of both personal names and regular surnames. Throughout Europe and the Mediterranean, other ancient civilizations distinguished individuals using single personal names. These names usually combined two elements or themes which allowed for hundreds or even thousands of possible combinations – a dithematic naming system. But a markedly different system of nomenclature arose in Italy, where the personal name was joined by a hereditary surname. Over time, this binomial system expanded to include additional names and designations.

The most important of these names was the nomen gentilicium, or simply nomen, a hereditary surname that identified a person as a member of a distinct gens. This was preceded by the praenomen, or "forename", a personal name that served to distinguish between the different members of a family. For example, a Roman named Publius Lemonius might have sons named Publius Lemonius, Lucius Lemonius, and Gaius Lemonius. Here, Lemonius is the nomen, identifying each person in the family as a member of the gens Lemonia; Publius, Lucius, and Gaius are praenomina used to distinguish between them.

The origin of this binomial system is lost in prehistory, but it appears to have been established in Latium and Etruria by at least 650 BC. In written form, the nomen was usually followed by a filiation, indicating the personal name of an individual's father, and sometimes the name of the mother or other antecedents. Toward the end of the Roman Republic, this was followed by the name of a citizen's voting tribe. Lastly, these elements could be followed by additional surnames, or cognomina, which could be either personal or hereditary, or a combination of both:

(praenomen ...)	nomen (eqv. nomen genticulum)	cognomen (cognomen ...)	(agnomen)

The Roman grammarians came to regard the combination of praenomen, nomen, and cognomen as a defining characteristic of Roman citizenship, known as the tria nomina. However, although all three elements of the Roman name existed throughout most of Roman history, the concept of the tria nomina can be misleading, because not all of these names were required or used throughout the whole of Roman history. During the period of the Roman Republic, the praenomen and nomen represented the essential elements of the name; the cognomen first appeared among the Roman aristocracy at the inception of the Republic, but was not widely used among the plebeians, who made up the majority of the Roman people, until the 2nd century BC. Even then, not all Roman citizens bore cognomina. Cognomen was regarded as somewhat less than an official name until the end of the Republic. By contrast, in imperial times the cognomen became the principal distinguishing element of the Roman name; although praenomina never completely vanished, the essential elements of the Roman name from the 2nd century onward were the nomen and cognomen.

Naming conventions for women also varied from the classical concept of the tria nomina. Originally Roman women shared the same binomial nomenclature as men; but over time the praenomen became less useful as a distinguishing element, and women's praenomina were gradually discarded, or replaced by informal names. By the end of the Republic, the majority of Roman women either did not have or did not use praenomina. Most women were called by their nomen alone, or by a combination of nomen and cognomen. Praenomina could still be given when necessary, and as with men's praenomina the practice survived well into imperial times, but the proliferation of personal cognomina eventually rendered women's praenomina obsolete.

In the later empire, members of the Roman aristocracy used several different schemes of assuming and inheriting nomina and cognomina, both to signify their rank, and to indicate their family and social connections. Some Romans came to be known by alternative names, or signa. Due to the lack of surviving epigraphic evidence, even among the aristocracy, the fully written-out names of most Romans are seldom recorded.

Thus, although the three types of names referred to as the tria nomina existed throughout Roman history, the period during which the majority of citizens possessed exactly three names was relatively brief. Nevertheless, because most of the important individuals during the best-recorded periods of Roman history possessed all three names, the tria nomina remains the most familiar conception of the Roman name.

For a variety of reasons, the Roman nomenclature system broke down in the centuries following the collapse of imperial authority in the west. The praenomen had already become scarce in written sources during the 4th century, and by the 5th century it was retained only by the most conservative elements of the old Roman aristocracy, such as the Aurelii Symmachi. Over the course of the 6th century, as Roman institutions and social structures gradually fell away, the need to distinguish between nomina and cognomina likewise vanished. By the end of the 7th century, the people of Italy and western Europe had reverted to single names. But many of the names that had originated as part of the tria nomina were adapted to this usage, and survived into modern times.

== Origin and development ==
As in other cultures, the early peoples of Italy probably used a single name, which later developed into the praenomen. Varro wrote that the earliest Italians used simple names. Names of this type could be honorific or aspirational, or might refer to deities, physical peculiarities, or circumstances of birth. In this early period, the number of personal names must have been quite large; however, with the development of additional names, the number in widespread use dwindled. By the early Republic, about three dozen Latin praenomina remained in use, some of which were already rare; about 18 were used by the patricians. Barely a dozen praenomina remained in general use under the Empire, although aristocratic families sometimes revived older praenomina, or created new praenomina out of cognomina.

The development of the nomen as the second element of the Italic name cannot be attributed to a specific period or culture. From the earliest period it was common to both the Indo-European speaking Italic peoples and the Etruscans. The historian Livy relates the adoption of Silvius as a nomen by the kings of Alba Longa in honour of their ancestor, Silvius. (Note: Livy refers to this as a cognomen, or "surname", which in later Roman practice was the third element of the Roman tria nomina; but it must be remembered that the word nomen simply means "name", and before the adoption of a second name, this is how the praenomen would have been called; thus, the first surnames adopted would have been known as cognomina before their gradually-increasing importance caused the word nomen to refer to them, while the original personal name became known as the praenomen, or "forename".) As part of Rome's foundation myth, this statement cannot be regarded as historical fact, but it does indicate the antiquity of the period to which the Romans themselves ascribed the adoption of hereditary surnames. (Note: Although a few individuals mentioned in relation to the period of and before Rome's legendary foundation in the 8th century BC are known by only a single name, it is equally difficult to discern which of these represent actual historical figures, and if so, whether their names were accurately remembered by the historians who recorded these myths centuries later. Romulus and Remus, together with their foster-father, the herdsman Faustulus, are among those easily remembered; but even supposing that Romulus and Remus are the names of historical persons, at least in theory they belonged to the royal house of the Silvii; or altrenately they might have been thought to have had no surname at all, because they were said to have been fathered by Mars himself. Meanwhile, Faustulus may represent a mythical personage interjected into Rome's foundation legend; although it may be noted that his name is a diminutive of the Latin praenomen Faustus. Almost all other persons mentioned as part of the traditions surrounding Romulus as the first King of Rome have both praenomen and nomen.)

In Latin, most nomina were formed by adding an adjective-forming suffix, usually -ius, to the stem of an existing word or name. Frequently, this required a joining element, such as -e-, -id-, -il-, or -on-. Many common nomina arose as patronymic surnames; for instance, the nomen Marcius was derived from the praenomen Marcus, and originally signified Marci filius, "son of Marcus". In the same way, Sextius, Publilius, and Lucilius arose from the praenomina Sextus, Publius, and Lucius. (Note: The practice was so common that nearly all Latin praenomina gave rise to patronymic nomina, including many that were uncommon in historical times.) This demonstrates that, much like later European surnames, the earliest nomina were not necessarily hereditary, but might be adopted and discarded at will, and changed from one generation to the next. The practice from which these patronymics arose also gave rise to the filiation, which in later times, once the nomen had become fixed, nearly always followed the nomen. Other nomina were derived from names that later came to be regarded as cognomina, such as Plancius from Plancus or Flavius from Flavus; or from place-names, such as Norbanus from Norba.

The binomial name consisting of praenomen and nomen eventually spread throughout Italy. Nomina from different languages and regions often have distinctive characteristics; Latin nomina tended to end in -ius, -us, -aius, -eius, -eus, or -aeus, while Oscan names frequently ended in -is or -iis; Umbrian names in -as, -anas, -enas, or -inas, and Etruscan names in -arna, -erna, -ena, -enna, -ina, or -inna. Oscan and Umbrian forms tend to be found in inscriptions; in Roman literature these names are often converted to a Latin form.

Many individuals added an extra surname, called a cognomen, which helped to distinguish subgroups within larger families. Originally a cognomen was simply some personal name or a nick-name, which might be derived from a person's physical features, personal qualities, occupation, place of origin, or even some object which the person was associated. Some cognomina were derived from the circumstance of a person's adoption from one family into another, or were derived from foreign names, such as when a freedman received a Roman praenomen and nomen. Other cognomina commemorated important places (family originally from the town of Regillum), events associated with a person, such as the capture of a town (Corioli) via a battle in which a man had fought (Coriolanus); or a miraculous event (Corvinus). The late grammarians further distinguished some cognomina as agnomina.

Although originally a personal name, the cognomen frequently became hereditary, especially in large families, or gentes, in which they served to identify distinct branches, known as stirpes. Some Romans had more than one cognomen, and in aristocratic families, it was not unheard of for individuals to have as many as three, of which some might be hereditary and some personal. These surnames were initially characteristic of patrician families, but over time, cognomina were also acquired by the plebeians. However, a number of distinguished plebeian gentes, such as the Antonii and the Marii, were never divided into different branches, and in these families cognomina were the exception rather than the rule.

Cognomina are known from the beginning of the Republic, but were long regarded as informal names, and omitted from most official records before the 2nd century BC. Later inscriptions commemorating the early centuries of the Roman Republic supply these missing surnames, although the authenticity of some of them has been disputed. Under the Empire, however, the cognomen acquired great importance, and the number of cognomina assumed by the Roman aristocracy multiplied exponentially.

Adding to the complexity of aristocratic names was the practice of combining the full nomenclature of both one's paternal and maternal ancestors, resulting in some individuals appearing to have two or more complete names. Duplicative or politically undesirable names might be omitted, while the order of names might be rearranged to emphasize those giving the bearer the greatest prestige.

Following the promulgation of the Constitutio Antoniniana in AD 212, granting Roman citizenship to all free men living within the Roman Empire, the praenomen and nomen lost much of their distinguishing function, as all of the newly enfranchised citizens shared the name of Marcus Aurelius. The praenomen and sometimes the nomen gradually disappeared from view, crowded out by other parts of personal names indicating the bearer's rank and social connections. Surviving inscriptions from the 5th century rarely provide a citizen's name in full.

In the final centuries of the Empire, the traditional nomenclature was sometimes replaced by alternate names, known as signa. In the course of the 7th century, as central authority collapsed and Roman institutions disappeared, the complex forms of Roman nomenclature were abandoned altogether, and the people of Italy and western Europe reverted to single names. Modern European nomenclature developed independently of the Roman model during the Middle Ages and the Renaissance. However, many modern names are derived from Roman originals.

== Tria nomina ==
The three types of names that have come to be regarded as quintessentially Roman were the praenomen, nomen, and cognomen. Together, these were referred to as the tria nomina. Although not all Romans possessed three names, the practice of using multiple names having different functions was a defining characteristic of Roman culture that distinguished citizens from foreigners.

=== Praenomen ===
The praenomen was a true personal name, chosen by a child's parents, and bestowed on the dies lustricus, or "day of lustration", a ritual purification performed on the eighth day after the birth of a girl, or the ninth day after the birth of a boy. (Note: In his treatise, De Praenominibus, Probus cites Quintus Mucius Scaevola, an authority on Roman law, for the proposition that boys did not receive a praenomen before assuming the Toga virilis, signifying the transition into adulthood, and that girls did not receive a praenomen before marriage. But this appears to refer to some sort of formal ceremony in which use of a praenomen was granted or "confirmed", rather than the original act of naming. The funerary inscriptions of many Romans who died in childhood conclusively demonstrate that Roman children had praenomina.) Normally all of the children in a family would have different praenomina. (Note: As usual, there were exceptions to this policy as well; for instance, among the Fabii Maximi, several brothers in a single family were all named Quintus; in the 1st century AD, the Flavii Sabini all bore the praenomen Titus, but were distinguished in each generation by the use of different cognomina. Also, because praenomina had grammatical gender, a brother and sister could have the same praenomen, but rendered in [linguistic [masculine) Although there was no law restricting the use of specific praenomina, (Note: A few exceptions are noted by the ancient historians; for example, supposedly no member of the Junii was named Titus or Tiberius after two brothers with this name, sons of the consul Lucius Junius Brutus, were put to death for plotting to restore the Roman monarchy. The Manlii were said to have forbidden the use of Marcus after the condemnation of Marcus Manlius Capitolinus; and after the death of Marcus Antonius and the execution of his son, it was decreed that none of the Antonii should ever again be named Marcus. However, all of these supposed prohibitions were subsequently broken.) the choice of the parents was usually governed by custom and family tradition. An eldest son was usually given the praenomen used by his father, and younger sons used the praenomina of their father's brothers, or other male ancestors. In this way, the same praenomina were passed on in a family from one generation to the next. Not only did this serve to emphasize the continuity of a family across many generations, but the selection of praenomina also distinguished the customs of one gens from another. The patrician gentes in particular tended to limit the number of praenomina that they used far more than the plebeians, which was a way of reinforcing the exclusiveness of their social status.

Of course, there were many exceptions to these general practices. A son might be named in honour of one of his maternal relatives, thus bringing a new name into the gens. Because some gentes made regular use of only three or four praenomina, new names might appear whenever a family had more than three or four sons. Furthermore, a number of the oldest and most influential patrician families made a habit of choosing unusual names; in particular the Fabii, Aemilii, Furii, Claudii, Cornelii, and Valerii all used praenomina that were uncommon amongst the patricians, or which had fallen out of general use. In the last two centuries of the Republic, through to the early Empire, it was fashionable for aristocratic families to revive older praenomina.

About three dozen Latin praenomina were in use at the beginning of the Republic, although only about eighteen were common. This number fell gradually, until by the 1st century AD, about a dozen praenomina remained in widespread use, with a handful of others used by particular families. The origin and use of praenomina was a matter of curiosity to the Romans themselves; in De Praenominibus, Probus discusses a number of older praenomina and their meanings. Most praenomina were regularly abbreviated, and rarely written in full. Other praenomina were used by the Oscan, Umbrian, and Etruscan-speaking peoples of Italy, and many of these also had regular abbreviations. (Lists of praenomina used by the various people of Italy, together with their usual abbreviations, can be found at praenomen.)

Roman men were usually known by their praenomina to members of their family and household, clientes and close friends; but outside of this circle, they might be called by their nomen, cognomen, or any combination of praenomen, nomen, and cognomen that was sufficient to distinguish them from other men with similar names. In the literature of the Republic, and on all formal occasions, such as when a senator was called upon to speak, it was customary to address a citizen by praenomen and nomen; or, if this were insufficient to provide him a name distinct from other members of his gens, by praenomen and cognomen combined.

In Imperial times, the altered naming practices of the aristocracy increasingly confused the general use of praenomeni. The emperors usually prefixed Imperator to their names as a praenomen, while at the same time retaining their own praenomina; but because most of the early emperors were legally adopted by their predecessors, and formally assumed new names, even these were subject to change. Several members of the Julio-Claudian dynasty exchanged their original praenomina for cognomina, or received cognomina in place of praenomina at birth. An emperor might emancipate or enfranchise large groups of people at once, and all of them would automatically obtain the emperor's praenomen and nomen, an extension of the older practice of acquiring purchased Roman citizenship via formal legal adoption by the presiding magistrate. Yet another common practice beginning in the 1st century AD was to give multiple sons the same praenomen, and distinguish them using different cognomina; by the 2nd century this was becoming the rule, rather than the exception. Another confusing practice was the addition of the full nomenclature of maternal ancestors to the basic tria nomina, so that a man might appear to have two praenomina, one occurring in the middle of his name.

Under the weight of these practices and others, the utility of the praenomen to distinguish between men continued to decline, until only the force of tradition prevented its utter abandonment. Over the course of the 3rd century, praenomina become increasingly scarce in written records, and from the 4th century onward their appearance becomes exceptional. The descendants of those who had been granted citizenship by the Constitutio Antoniniana seem to have dispensed with praenomina altogether, and by the end of the western empire, only the oldest Roman families continued to use them.

=== Nomen ===
The nomen gentilicium, or "gentile name", (Note: Although this use of the term gentile has the same origin as the term used to distinguish non-Jews from the Jewish population, its meaning is purely civil and has nothing to do with ethnic or religious identity; in this use it simply refers to a member of a gens, distinguished by his or her surname, and in this sense the term gentile name is used today without any religious connotation, despite (or perhaps because of) the use of Christian name to refer to personal names. In this mixed sense, Romanized Jews could also be "gentiles", and gentiles could be Jewish! This is also the origin of the term gentleman; the association of gentlemen with courtesy developed later.) designated a Roman citizen as a member of a gens. A gens, which may be translated as "clan", constituted an extended Roman group of individuals, all of whom shared the same nomen and claimed descent from a common ancestor. Particularly in the early Republic, the gens functioned as a state within the state, observing its own sacred rites and establishing private laws, which were binding on its members, although not on the community as a whole.

=== Cognomen ===
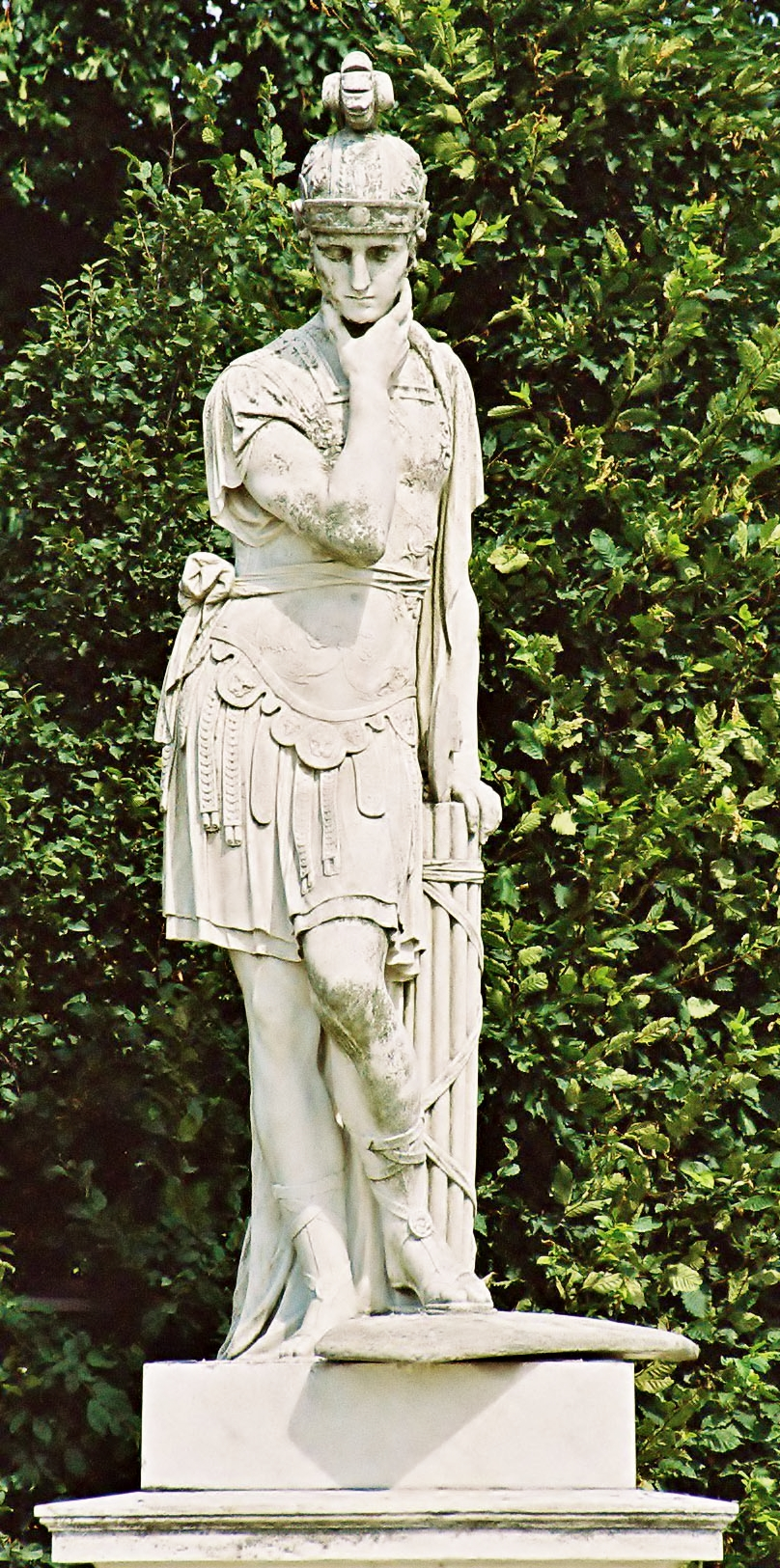
Quintus Fabius Maximus Verrucosus, surnamed "Cunctator". Maximus was the branch of the Fabia gens to which he belonged; Verrucosus was a personal cognomen referring to a wart above his upper lip; Cunctator a cognomen ex virtute referring to his delaying strategy against Hannibal. Statue at Schönbrunn Palace, Vienna

The cognomen, the third element of the tria nomina, began as an additional personal name. It was not unique to Rome, but Rome was where the cognomen flourished, as the development of the gens and the gradual decline of the praenomen as a useful means of distinguishing between individuals made the cognomen a useful means of identifying both individuals and whole branches of Rome's leading families. In the early years of the Republic, some aristocratic Romans had as many as three cognomina, some of which were hereditary, while others were personal.

Like the nomen, a cognomen could be arise from many factors:

- personal characteristics, habits, occupations, places of origin, heroic exploits, and so forth.
- One class of cognomina consisted largely of archaic praenomina that were seldom used during the later Republic, although when used as cognomina these names persisted throughout Imperial times.

Many cognomina had unusual terminations for Latin names, ending in -a, -o, or -io, and their meanings were frequently obscure, even in antiquity; this seems to emphasize the manner in which many cognomina originally arose from nicknames. The -ius termination typical of Latin nomina was generally not used for cognomina until the 4th century AD, making it easier to distinguish between nomina and cognomina through to the final centuries of the Western Roman Empire.

A cognomen was not used like the nomen, which was passed down unchanged from father to son. New cognomina were coined and came into fashion throughout Roman history. An individual's cognomen could be newly applied or disposed of almost at will; a cognomen was not normally chosen by the person that bore it, but rather was earned and bestowed by other persons, which may account for the wide variety of unflattering names that were used as cognomina. Doubtless some cognomina were used ironically, while others continued in use largely because, whatever their origin, they were useful for distinguishing among individuals and between branches of large families and later evolved from praenomini of hounoured ancestors.

Under the Empire, the number of cognomina increased dramatically. Where once only the most noble patrician houses used multiple surnames, Romans of all backgrounds and social standing might bear several cognomina. By the 3rd century, this had become the norm amongst freeborn Roman citizens. The question of how to classify different cognomina led the grammarians of the 4th–5th centuries to designate some of them as agnomina.

For most of the Republic, the usual manner of distinguishing individuals was through the binomial form of praenomen and nomen. But as the praenomen lost its value as a distinguishing name, and gradually faded into obscurity, its former role was assumed by the versatile cognomen, and the typical manner of identifying individuals came to be by nomen and cognomen; essentially one formulation of binomial names was replaced by another, over the course of several centuries. The very lack of regularity that allowed the cognomen to be used as either a personal or a hereditary surname became its strength in imperial times; as a hereditary surname, a cognomen could be used to identify an individual's connection with other noble families, either by descent, or later by association. Individual cognomina could also be used to distinguish between members of the same family; even as siblings came to share the same praenomen, they bore different cognomina, some from their paternal line, and others from their maternal ancestors.

Although the nomen was a required element of Roman nomenclature down to the end of the western empire, its usefulness as a distinguishing name declined throughout imperial times, as an increasingly large portion of the population bore nomina such as Flavius or Aurelius, which had been granted en masse by the seated emperor (legally, the presiding magistrate for the new citizens' pro-forma adoptions) to newly enfranchised citizens. As a result, by the 3rd century the cognomen became the most important element of the Roman name, and frequently the only one that had any practical use for distinguishing between individuals. In the later empire, the proliferation of cognomina was such that the full nomenclature of most individuals was not recorded, and in many cases the only names surviving in extant records are cognomina.

By the 6th century, traditional Roman cognomina were frequently prefixed by a series of names with Christian religious significance. As Roman electoral and ceremonial institutions vanished, and the distinction between nomen and cognomen ceased to have any practical importance, the complicated system of cognomina that developed under the late empire faded away. The people of the western empire reverted to single names, which were indistinguishable from the cognomina that they replaced; many former praenomina and nomina also persisted in this way.

==== Agnomen ====
The proliferation of cognomina in the later centuries of the Empire led some grammarians to classify certain types as agnomina. This class included two main types of cognomen: the cognomen ex virtute, and cognomina that were derived from nomina, to indicate the parentage of Romans who had been adopted out of one gens into another. Although these names had existed throughout Roman history, it was only in this late period that they were distinguished from other cognomina.

===== Cognomina ex virtute =====
The cognomen ex virtute was a surname derived from some virtuous or heroic episode attributed to the bearer. Roman history is filled with individuals who obtained cognomina as a result of their exploits: Aulus Postumius Albus Regillensis, who commanded the Roman army at the Battle of Lake Regillus; Gaius Marcius Coriolanus, who captured the city of Corioli; Marcus Valerius Corvus, who defeated a giant Gaul in single combat, aided by a raven (Corvinus); Titus Manlius Torquatus, who likewise defeated a Gaulish giant, and took his name from the torque that he claimed as a prize; Publius Cornelius Scipio Africanus, who carried the Second Punic War to Africa, and defeated Hannibal. The examples most often described in scholarship on the subject regarding this class of cognomen come from the period of the Republic, centuries before the concept of the agnomen had been formed.

===== Adoptive cognomina =====
Adoption was a common and formal process in Roman culture. Its chief purpose had nothing to do with providing homes for children; it was about ensuring the continuity of family lines that might otherwise become extinct. In early Rome, this was especially important for the patricians, who enjoyed tremendous status and privilege compared with the plebeians. Because few families were admitted to the patriciate after the expulsion of the kings, while the number of plebeians continually grew, the patricians continually struggled to preserve their wealth and influence. A man who had no sons to inherit his property and preserve his family name would adopt one of the younger sons from another family. In time, as the plebeians also acquired wealth and gained access to the offices of the Roman state, they too came to participate in the Roman system of adoption.

Since the primary purpose of adoption was to preserve the name and status of the adopter, an adopted son would usually assume both the praenomen and nomen of his adoptive father, together with any hereditary cognomina, just as an eldest son would have done. However, adoption did not result in the complete abandonment of the adopted son's birth name. The son's original nomen (or occasionally cognomen) would become the basis of a new surname, formed by adding the derivative suffix -anus or -inus to the stem. Thus, when a son of Lucius Aemilius Paullus was adopted by Publius Cornelius Scipio, he became Publius Cornelius Scipio Aemilianus.

== Filiation ==
Apart from the praenomen, the filiation was the oldest element of the Roman name. Even before the development of the nomen as a hereditary surname, it was customary to use the name of a person's father as a means of distinguishing him or her from others with the same personal name, like a patronymic; thus Lucius, the son of Marcus, would be Lucius, Marci filius; Paulla, the daughter of Quintus, would be Paulla, Quinti filia. Many nomina were derived in the same way, and most praenomina have at least one corresponding nomen, such as Lucilius, Marcius, Publilius, Quinctius, or Servilius. These are known as patronymic surnames, because they are derived from the name of the original bearer's father. Even after the development of the nomen and cognomen, filiation remained a useful means of distinguishing between members of a large family.

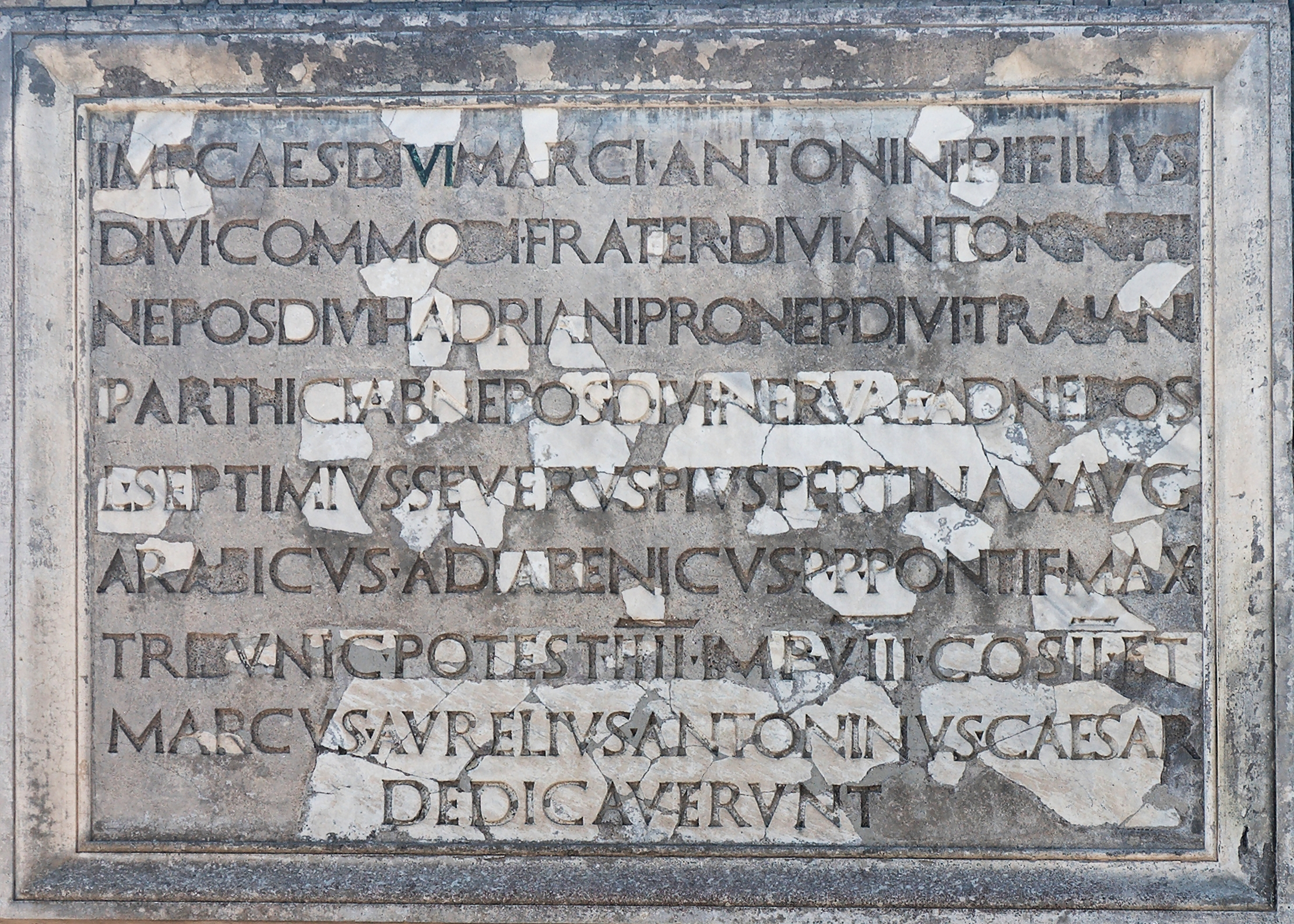
"Dedicated by the emperor Caesar, son of the divine Marcus Antoninus Pius, brother of the divine Commodus, grandson of the divine Antoninus Pius, great-grandson of the divine Hadrian, great-great-grandson of the divine Trajan, conqueror of Parthia, great-great-great-grandson of the divine Nerva, Lucius Septimius Severus Pius Pertinax Augustus Arabicus Adiabenicus, father of his country, Pontifex Maximus, holding the tribunician power for the fourth year, in the eighth year of his imperium, consul for the second time; and Marcus Aurelius Antoninus Caesar"

Filiations were normally written between the nomen and any cognomina, and abbreviated using the typical abbreviations for praenomina, followed by f. for filius or filia, and sometimes n. for nepos (grandson) or neptis (granddaughter). Thus, the inscription S. Postumius A. f. P. n. Albus Regillensis means "Spurius Postumius Albus Regillensis, of Aulus the son, of Publius the grandson". "Tiberius Aemilius Mamercinus, the son of Lucius and grandson of Mamercus" would be written Ti. Aemilius L. f. Mam. n. Mamercinus. The more formal the writing, the more generations might be included; a great-grandchild would be pron. or pronep. for pronepos or proneptis, a great-great-grandchild abn. or abnep. for abnepos or abneptis, and a great-great-great-grandchild adnepos or adneptis. (Note: Also spelled atnepos and atneptis.) However, these forms are rarely included as part of a name, except on the grandest of monumental inscriptions.

The filiation sometimes included the name of the mother, in which case gnatus (Note: Also spelled natus; this could be abbreviated gn., gnat., or, perhaps confusingly, n.) would follow the mother's name, instead of filius or filia. (Note: Evidently there were exceptions to this as well. For example, CIL gives the name Fabia Domitia Ɔ. f. Secunda, in which Ɔ.f. can only be read "Gaiae filia" (the use of an inverted C. for "Gaia" was common in the filiations of freedmen, but apparently not restricted to them; see below); this may be the same woman referred to as Fabia Domitia D. f. Secunda, in the latter case giving her father's name. Both inscriptions are from Roman Spain, and are also notable for the doubled nomen and for the cognomen Secunda, which in this case is really a praenomen placed after the filiation, a common practice in Roman women's names of this period.) This is especially common in families of Etruscan origin. The names of married women were sometimes followed by the husband's name and uxor for "wife of". N. Fabius Q. f. M. n. Furia gnatus Maximus means "Numerius Fabius Maximus, son of Quintus, grandson of Marcus, born of Furia", (Note: Note that while the names of the father and grandfather are genitive (Quinti filius, Marci nepos), the mother's name is ablative; the translation "born of" is simply idiomatic in English. "Born to" would also be idiomatic, but could imply the dative case.) while Claudia L. Valeri uxor would be "Claudia, wife of Lucius Valerius".

Slaves and freedmen also possessed filiations, although in this case the person referred to is usually the slave's owner, rather than his or her father. The abbreviations here include s. for servus or serva and l. for libertus or liberta. A slave might have more than one owner, in which case the names could be given serially. In some cases the owner's nomen or cognomen was used instead of or in addition to the praenomen. The liberti of women sometimes used an inverted letter 'C' (Ɔ), signifying the feminine praenomen Gaia, here used generically to mean any woman; and there are a few examples of an inverted 'M' (ꟽ), although it is not clear whether this was used generically, or specifically for the feminine praenomen Marca or Marcia.

An example of the filiation of slaves and freedmen would be: Alexander Corneli L. s., "Alexander, slave of Lucius Cornelius", who upon his emancipation would probably become L. Cornelius L. l. Alexander, "Lucius Cornelius Alexander, freedman of Lucius"; it was customary for a freedman to take the praenomen of his former owner, if he did not already have one, and to use his original personal name as a cognomen. Another example might be Salvia Pompeia Cn. Ɔ. l., "Salvia Pompeia, freedwoman of Gnaeus (Pompeius) and Gaia"; here Gaia is used generically, irrespective of whether Pompeius' wife was actually named Gaia. A freedman of the emperor might have the filiation Aug. l., Augusti libertus.

Although filiation was common throughout the history of the Republic and well into imperial times, no law governed its use or inclusion in writing. It was used by custom and for convenience, but could be ignored or discarded, as it suited the needs of the writer.

== Tribe ==
From the beginning of the Roman Republic, all citizens were enumerated in one of the tribes making up the comitia tributa, or "tribal assembly". This was the most democratic of Rome's three main legislative assemblies of the Roman Republic, in that all citizens could participate on an equal basis, without regard to wealth or social status. Over time, its decrees (known as plebi scita, or "plebiscites") became binding on the whole Roman people. Although much of the assembly's authority was usurped by the emperors, membership in a tribe remained an important part of Roman citizenship, so that the name of the tribe came to be incorporated into a citizen's full nomenclature.

The number of tribes varied over time; tradition ascribed the institution of thirty tribes to Servius Tullius, the sixth King of Rome, but ten of these were destroyed at the beginning of the Republic. Several tribes were added between 387–241 BC, as large swaths of Italy came under Roman control, bringing the total number of tribes to thirty-five; except for a brief experiment at the end of the Social War in 88 BC, this number remained fixed. The nature of the tribes was mainly geographic, rather than ethnic; inhabitants of Rome were, in theory, assigned to one of the four "urban" tribes, while the territory beyond the city was allocated to the "rural" or "rustic" tribes.

Geography was not the sole determining factor in one's tribus; at times efforts were made to assign freedmen to the four urban tribes, thus concentrating their votes and limiting their influence on the comitia tributa. Perhaps for similar reasons, when large numbers of provincials gained the franchise, certain rural tribes were preferred for their enrollment. Citizens did not normally change tribes when they moved from one region to another; but the censors had the power to punish a citizen by expelling him from one of the rural tribes and assigning him to one of the urban tribes. In later periods, most citizens were enrolled in tribes without respect to geography.

Precisely when it became common to include the name of a citizen's tribus as part of his full nomenclature is uncertain. The name of the tribe normally follows the filiation and precedes any cognomina, suggesting that its addition preceded formal recognition of the cognomen – thus, no later than the 2nd century BC. However, in both writing and inscriptions, the tribus is found with much less frequency than other parts of the name; so the custom of including it does not seem to have been deeply ingrained in Roman practice. As with the filiation, it was common to abbreviate the name of the tribe. For the names of the 35 tribes and their abbreviations, see Roman tribe.

== Women's names ==
In the earliest period, the binomial nomenclature of praenomen and nomen that developed throughout Italy was shared by both men and women. Most praenomina had both masculine and feminine forms, although a number of praenomina common to women were seldom or never used by men. Just as men's praenomina, women's names were regularly abbreviated instead of being written in full. (A list of women's praenomina can be found at praenomen.)

For a variety of reasons, women's praenomina became neglected over the course of Roman history, and by the end of the Republic, most women did not have or did not use praenomina. They did not disappear entirely, nor were Roman women bereft of personal names; but for most of Roman history women were known chiefly by their nomina or cognomina. The first of these reasons is probably that the praenomen itself lost much of its original utility following the adoption of hereditary surnames; the number of praenomina commonly used by both men and women declined throughout Roman history. For men, who might hold public office or serve in the military, the praenomen remained an important part of the legal name. As Roman women played little role in public life, the factors that resulted in the continuation of men's praenomina did not exist for women.

Another factor was probably that the praenomen was not usually necessary to distinguish between women within the family. Because a Roman woman did not change her nomen when she married, her nomen alone was usually sufficient to distinguish her from every other member of the family. As Latin names had distinctive masculine and feminine forms, the nomen was sufficient to distinguish a daughter from both of her parents and all of her brothers. Thus, there was no need for a personal name unless there were multiple sisters in the same household.

When this occurred, praenomina could be and frequently were used to distinguish between sisters. However, it was also common to identify sisters using a variety of names, some of which could be used as either praenomina or cognomina. For example, if Publius Servilius had two daughters, they would typically be referred to as Servilia Major and Servilia Minor. If there were more daughters, the eldest might be called Servilia Prima or Servilia Maxima; (Note: However, the eldest daughter, who might have been called by her nomen alone for several years, might continue to be so called even after the birth of younger sisters; in this case only the younger sisters might receive distinctive personal names.) younger daughters as Servilia Secunda, Tertia, Quarta, etc. All of these names could be used as praenomina, preceding the nomen, but common usage from the later Republic onward was to treat them as personal cognomina; when these names appear in either position, it is frequently impossible to determine whether they were intended as praenomina or cognomina.

Although women's praenomina were infrequently used in the later Republic, they continued to be used, when needed, into imperial times. Among the other peoples of Italy, women's praenomina continued to be used regularly until the populace was thoroughly Romanized. In the Etruscan culture, where women held a markedly higher social status than at Rome or in other ancient societies, inscriptions referring to women nearly always include praenomina.

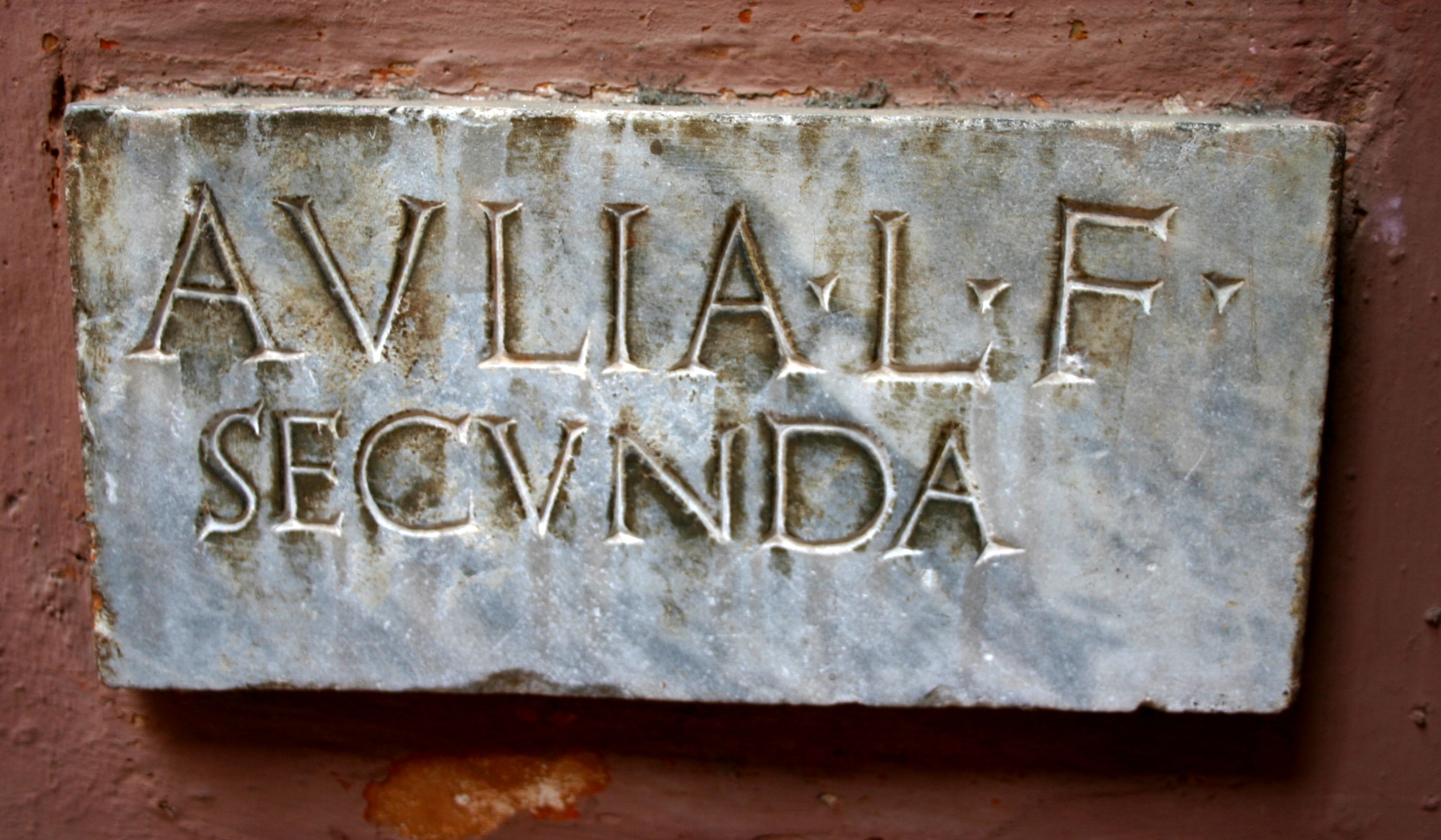
Avlia L.F. Secunda Aulia Secunda, daughter of Lucius

Most Roman women were known by their nomina, with such distinction as described above for older and younger siblings. If further distinction were needed, she could be identified as a particular citizen's daughter or wife. For instance, Cicero refers to a woman as Annia P. Anni senatoris filia, which means "Annia, daughter of Publius Annius, the senator". However, toward the end of the Republic, as hereditary cognomina came to be regarded as proper names, a woman might be referred to by her cognomen instead, or by a combination of nomen and cognomen; the daughter of Lucius Caecilius Metellus was usually referred to as Caecilia Metella. Sometimes these cognomina were given diminutive forms, such as Agrippina from the masculine Agrippa, or Drusilla from Drusus.

In imperial times, other, less formal names were sometimes used to distinguish between women with similar names. Still later, Roman women, like men, adopted signa, or alternative names, in place of their Roman names. Finally, with the fall of the western empire in the 5th century, the last traces of the distinctive Italic nomenclature system began to disappear, and women too reverted to single names.

== Foreign names ==
As Roman territory expanded beyond Italy, many foreigners obtained Roman citizenship, and adopted Roman names. Often these were discharged auxiliary soldiers, or the leaders of annexed towns and peoples. Customarily a newly enfranchised citizen would adopt the praenomen and nomen of his patron; that is, the person who had adopted or manumitted him, or otherwise procured his citizenship. But many such individuals retained a portion of their original names, usually in the form of cognomina. This was especially true for citizens of Greek origin. A name such as T. Flavius Aristodemus or Gaius Julius Hyginus would be typical of such persons, although in form these names are not distinguishable from those of freedmen. (Note: In such cases, the filiation, if present, would indicate if someone were a freedman; but in these particular instances the nomina suggest citizens of provincial origin, who have been enfranchised by imperial decree.)

The Constitutio Antoniniana promulgated by Caracalla in AD 212 was perhaps the most far-reaching of many imperial decrees enfranchising large numbers of non-citizens living throughout the empire. It extended citizenship to all free inhabitants of the empire, all of whom thus received the name Marcus Aurelius, after the emperor's praenomen and nomen. The result was that vast numbers of individuals who had never possessed praenomina or nomina formally shared the same names. In turn, many of the "new Romans" promptly discarded their praenomina, and ignored their nomina except when required by formality. As a result, the cognomina adopted by these citizens, often including their original non-Latin names, became the most important part of their nomenclature.

== Later development ==
During the Empire, a variety of new naming conventions developed which, while differing, were internally coherent.

=== Binary nomenclature and polyonymy ===
Under the "High Empire", the new aristocracy began adopting two or more nomina – a practice which has been termed 'binary nomenclature'. This arose out of a desire to incorporate distinguished maternal ancestry in a name or, in order to inherit property, an heir was required by a will to incorporate the testator's name into his own name. For example, the suffect consul of AD 118–119, Gaius Bruttius Praesens Lucius Fulvius Rusticus, has a name which is composed of two standard sets of tria nomina: he was the natural son of a Lucius Bruttius, and added the nomina of his maternal grandfather, Lucius Fulvius Rusticus, to his paternal nomina.

In order to reflect an illustrious pedigree or other connections, the aristocracy expanded the binary nomenclature concept to include other nomina from an individual's paternal and maternal ancestry. There was seemingly no limit to the number of names which could be added in this way (known as polyonomy); for example, name of the man elected consul in 169 AD is usually written Q. Sosius Priscus, but he advertised his complicated pedigree, stretching back 3 generations, by using 38 alternate names, made up of 14 nomina.

=== Cognomen replaces praenomen ===
The praenomen, even under the classic system, had never been particularly distinctive because of the limited number of praenomina available. Between the late Republic and the 2nd century AD, the praenomen gradually became less used and eventually disappeared altogether. Even among the senatorial aristocracy it became a rarity by about 300 AD. In part this came about through a tendency for the same praenomen to be given to all males of a family, thereby fossilizing a particular praenomen/nomen combination and making the praenomen even less distinctive, e.g. all males in the emperor Vespasian's family (including all his sons) had the praenomen / nomen combination Titus Flavius:

Titus Flavius Petro
Titus Flavius Sabinus	Vespasia Polla
Titus Flavius Sabinus	Titus Flavius Vespasianus emperor Vespasian	Flavia Domitilla
Titus Flavius Sabinus	Titus Flavius Clemens	Titus Flavius Vespasianus emperor Titus	Titus Flavius Domitianus emperor Domitian

The cognomen, as in Vespasian's family, then assumed the distinguishing function for individuals; where this happened, the cognomen replaced the praenomen in intimate address. The result was that two names remained in use for formal public address but instead of praenomen + nomen, it became nomen + cognomen.

=== Edict of Caracalla ===
With the Constitutio Antoniniana in AD 212, the emperor Caracalla granted Roman citizenship to all free inhabitants of the empire. It had long been the expectation that when a non-Roman acquired citizenship as part of his enfranchisement, he took on a part of the Roman name of the granting magistrate. With the mass enfranchisement of AD 212, the new citizens adopted the nomen "Aurelius" in recognition of Caracalla's beneficence (the emperor's full name was Marcus Aurelius Severus Antoninus Augustus, with Aurelius being the nomen). Aurelius quickly became the most common nomen in the east and the second most common (after Julius) in the west. The change in the origins of the new governing elite that assumed control of the empire from the end of the 3rd century can be seen in their names: Of the 11 emperors between Gallienus and Diocletian, 7 of them used the name "Marcus Aurelius" (Claudius Gothicus, Quintillus, Probus, Carus, Carinus, Numerian, and Maximian).

Although praenomina were not adopted by the new citizens, reflecting the pre-existing decline among "old" Romans, in the west the new names were formulated on the same basis as the existing Roman practices. In the east, however, the new citizens formulated their names by placing "Aurelius" before versions of their non-Roman given name and a patronymic. Ultimately, the ubiquity of Aurelius meant that it could became no longer a distinct nomen, and became primarily just a badge of citizenship added to any name.

=== Traditional nomen replaced ===
Although a nomen would long be required for official purposes, and, in isolated corners of the empire and in parts of Italy, its use persisted into the 7th century, the nomen was generally omitted from the name (even of emperors) by the 3rd century.

Two factors encouraged its frequent non-use. Firstly, the cognomen increasingly became the distinguishing name and general name of address. As a result, "New Romans" and, under their influence, "old Romans" too, either dropped the nomen from their name or, in some cases, treated the nomen as a praenomen.

Secondly, with the nomen becoming an increasingly fossilized formality, non-Italian families, even those who had acquired citizenship and a nomen prior to 212, began to ignore their nomen. When a nomen was required for official purposes they would simply put the default nomen of "Aurelius" in front of their name, rather than use their actual nomen.

== See also ==
- Ancient Greek personal names – Branch of onomastics
- Latinisation of names – Practice of rendering a non-Latin name in a Latin style
- Spanish naming customs
- Portuguese name
- French name
- Italian name
- Romanian name
- List of Roman nomina
- List of Roman cognomina

== Bibliography ==
- Ashley, Leonard R N; Hanifin, Michael J.F. (1978). "Onomasticon of Roman anthroponyms: explication and application (part I)". Names. 26 (4): 297–401. doi:10.1179/nam.1978.26.4.297. ISSN 1756-2279.
- Ashley, Leonard R.N.; Hanifin, Michael J.F. (1979). "Onomasticon of Roman anthroponyms: explication and application (part II)". Names. 27 (1): 1–45. doi:10.1179/nam.1979.27.1.1. ISSN 1756-2279.
- Fraenkel, Ernst (1935). "Namenwesen, Die lateinischen Personennamen". Realencyclopädie der classischen Altertumswissenschaft (in German). Vol. XVI, 2. Stuttgart: Butcher. cols. 1648–1670.
- Kantola, Urpo; Nuorluoto, Tuomo (2016). "Female tria nomina and social standing in late republican and early imperial periods". Arctos: Acta Philologica Fennica. 50: 79–105. doi:10.71390/arctos.85001.
- Keenan, James G. (1973). "The names Flavius and Aurelius as status designations in later Roman Egypt". Zeitschrift für Papyrologie und Epigraphik. 11: 33–63. ISSN 0084-5388. JSTOR 20180492.
- Liberati, Anna Maria; Bourbon, Fabio (2005). Ancient Rome. Barnes and Noble Press. ISBN 0-7607-6234-1.
- Pope, Stephanie M. (2004). Unit 3. Cambridge Latin Course. Cambridge University Press. ISBN 0-521-78230-9.
- Salway, Benet (1994). "What's in a name? A survey of Roman onomastic practice from c. 700 B.C. to A.D. 700" (PDF). Journal of Roman Studies. 84: 124–145. doi:10.2307/300873. JSTOR 300873. S2CID 162435434. Archived (PDF) from the original on 2020-04-11.
- Solin, Heikki (2012). "names, personal, Roman". Oxford Classical Dictionary (4th ed.). doi:10.1093/acrefore/9780199381135.013.4329. ISBN 978-0-19-938113-5.
