= Titus Flavius Sabinus =

Titus Flavius Sabinus was the name of several notable Ancient Romans, including:

- Titus Flavius Sabinus, father of the emperor Vespasian.
- Titus Flavius Sabinus, brother of Vespasian, was consul suffectus in AD 47 and praefectus urbi under the emperor Nero.
- Titus Flavius Sabinus, consul suffectus in AD 69, and probably a nephew of Vespasian.
- Titus Flavius Sabinus, consul suffectus in AD 82, nephew of Vespasian, and son of the consul of 47.
