= Flavia Domitilla =

Flavia Domitilla may refer to:

- Flavia Domitilla the Elder (died before 69 AD), the wife of the Roman Emperor Vespasian
- Flavia Domitilla the Younger (c. 45 – c. 66), Vespasian's only daughter
- Flavia Domitilla (wife of Clemens) (fl. 1st century), granddaughter of Vespasian
