= Flavius Caesar =

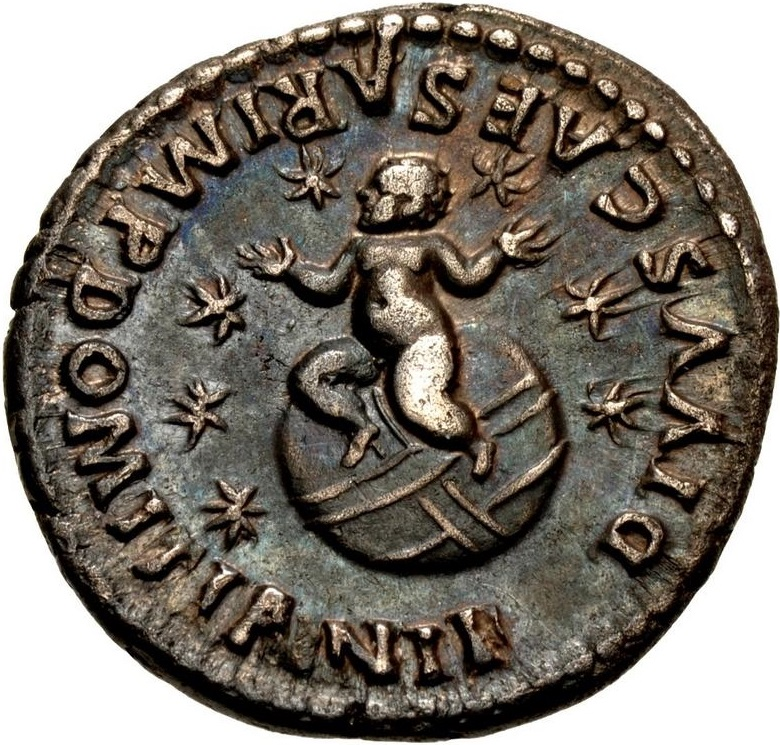
A coin depicting Roman empress Domitia and her son.

Flavius Caesar (73 – 82 AD), posthumously Divus Caesar, was the only son and heir of the Roman Emperor Domitian.

== Biography ==
Flavius was the only son of Domitian and Domitia Longina. He had a younger sister who also died young. He is believed to have been born around 73, whilst his grandfather Vespasian held the Imperial office.

In 82, in the second year of his father's reign, the boy died, and was raised to the status of divus in the Imperial Cult, thus making him a god. That Flavius was designated Caesar and heir to the throne during his lifetime is suggested by the gold and silver coins minted posthumously in 82/83 AD, on which he is referred to as Divus Caesar, and his mother Domitia as Divi Caesaris Mater.

Since Domitian did not have any other biological sons, he named the sons of his niece Flavia Domitilla and cousin Titus Flavius Clemens as his heirs, adopting them under the names of Vespasianus and Domitianus.
