= Julia Flavia =

Daughter of Emperor Titus

- FLAVIA IVLIA
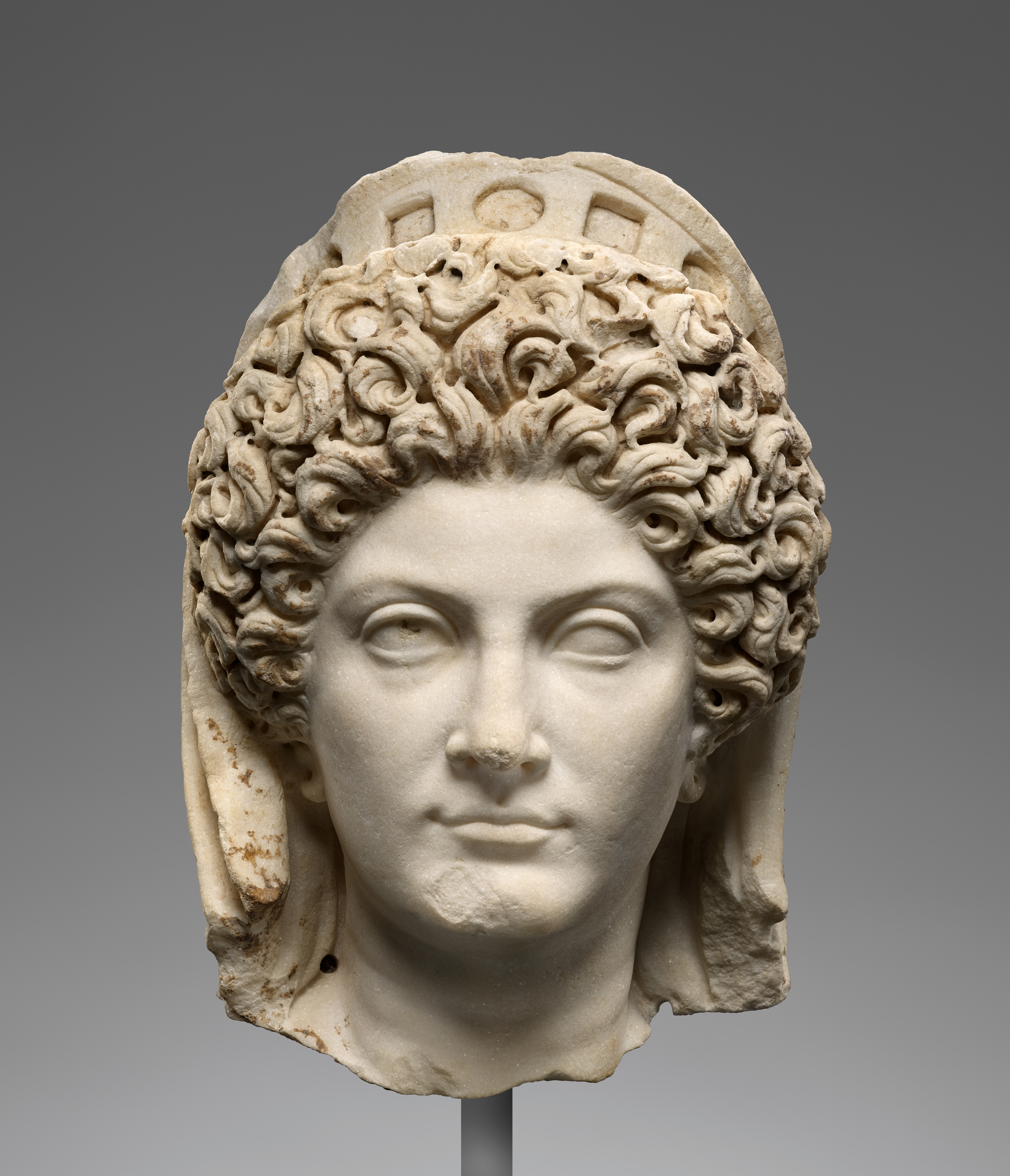
- Marble bust of Julia Flavia
- Born: c. 63
- Died: 91 (aged 27–28)
- Known for: daughter of Roman emperor Titus
- Spouse: Titus Flavius Sabinus
- Parents: Titus (father); Arrecina Tertulla (mother)
- Family: Flavian dynasty

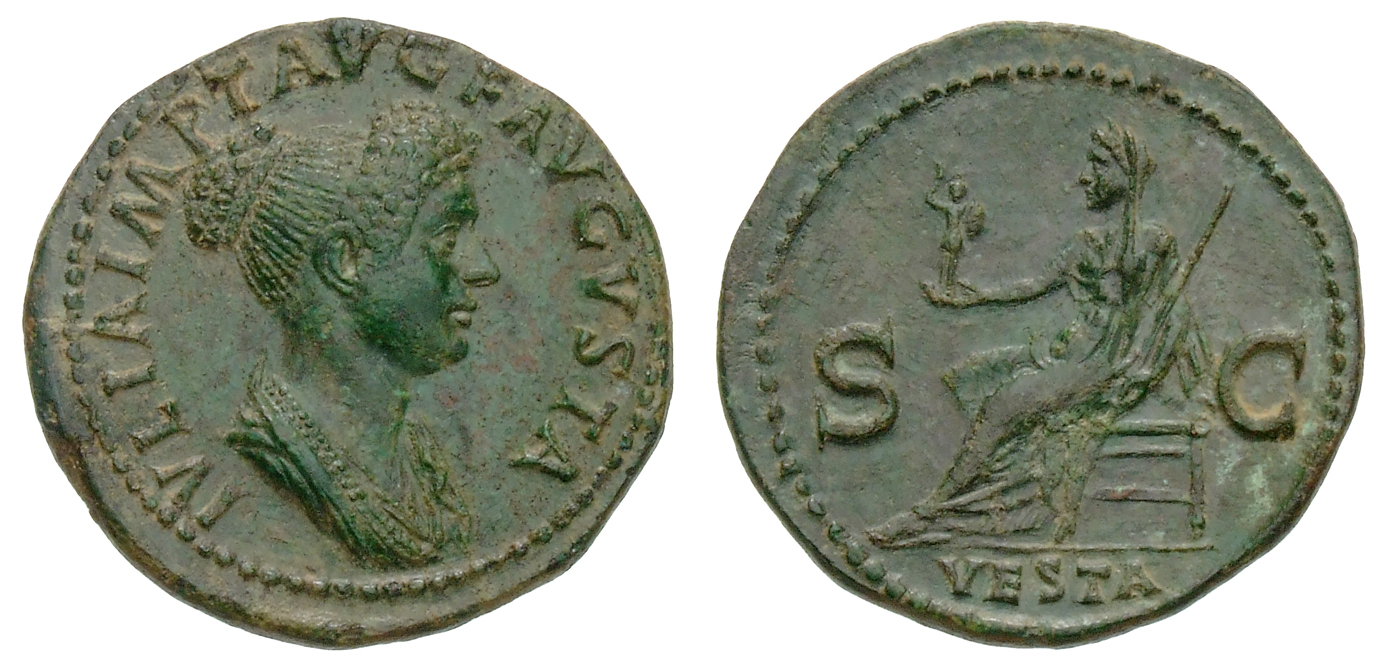
Dupondius of Julia Titi showing her portrait and Vesta on reverse (13.17 g, 28 mm)

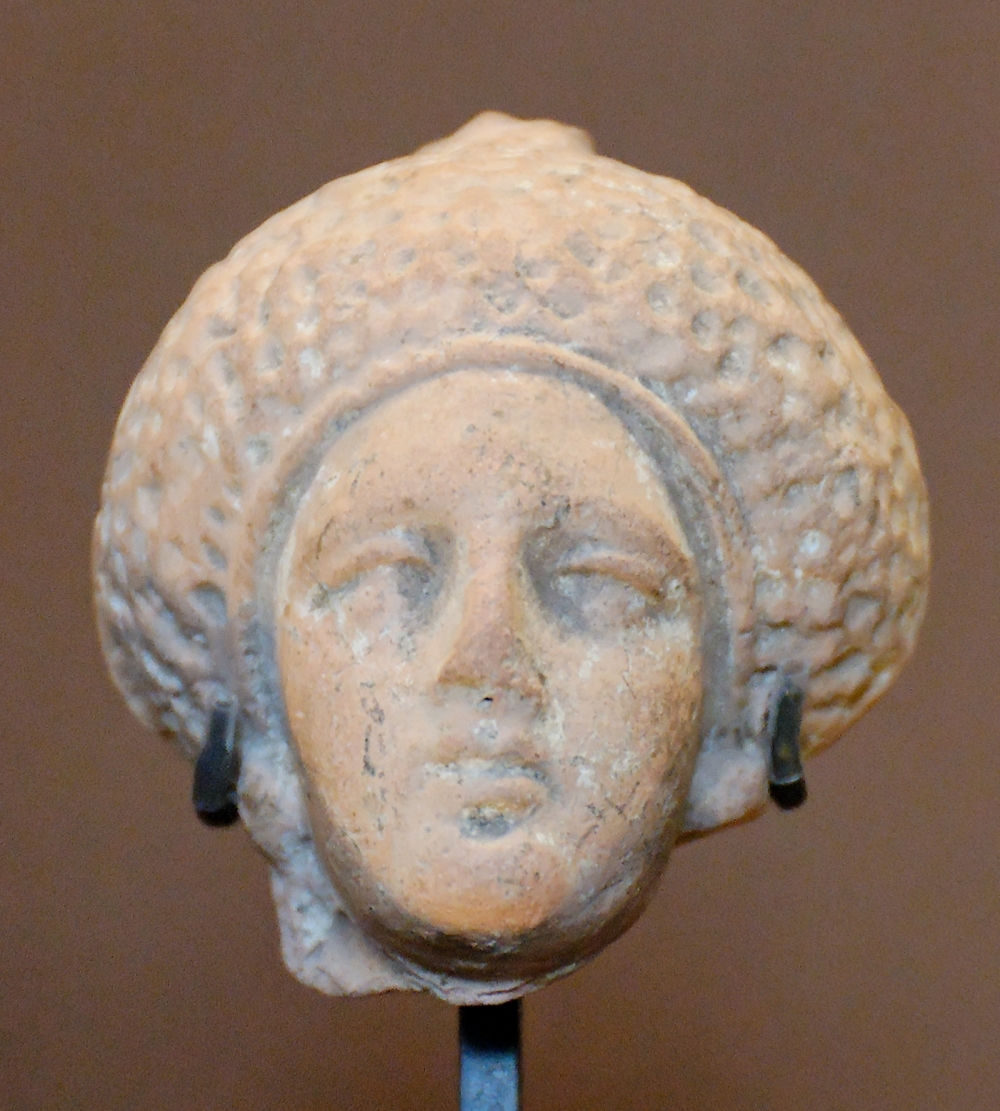
Julia Flavia hairstyle, Terracotta made in Smyrna, c. 90 - Louvre

Julia Flavia (c. 63 (Note: Suetonius states that Titus captured the city of Jerusalem on the 6th birthday of his daughter, this date being 8 September 70, but since Julia is presumed to have been the daughter of Titus by his first marriage she must have been born before 64 when Titus was already married to his second wife. Thus the birthdate 8 September 64 likely belongs to her sister.) – 91) or Flavia Julia, nicknamed Julia Titi, was the daughter of Roman Emperor Titus and his first wife Arrecina Tertulla. Julia Titi gained the title Augusta at her father's accession in 79.

== Biography ==
=== Early life ===
Julia was born in Rome to Titus and Arrecina Tertulla, she was named for Tertulla's mother Julia Ursa. Her mother was either divorced or died when Julia was an infant. Her father later remarried to Marcia Furnilla with whom he had another daughter who is presumed to have died young. In 65, after the failure of the Pisonian conspiracy, the family of Furnilla was disfavored by Nero. Julia's father, Titus concluded that he did not want to be connected with any potential plotters and ended his marriage to Julia's step-mother. Julia was likely raised by her maternal grandmother and the wet nurse Phyllis (who had already reared Julia's uncle Domitian as a child).

=== Marriage ===
When growing up, Titus offered her in marriage to his brother Domitian, but he refused because of his infatuation with Domitia Longina. Later she married her second paternal cousin Titus Flavius Sabinus, brother to consul Titus Flavius Clemens, who married her first cousin Flavia Domitilla.

=== Later life ===
After the death of her husband Julia lived in the palace with her uncle and his wife Domitia Longina.

Ancient historians report stories that Julia was seduced by her uncle and died having an abortion forced upon her by him, for example Dio claimed that he "lived with [her] as husband with wife, making little effort at concealment. Then upon the demands of the people he became reconciled with Domitia, but continued his relations with Julia nonetheless." and Juvenal stated "such a man was that adulterer [i.e. Domitian] who, after lately defiling himself by a union of the tragic style, revived the stern laws that were to be a terror to all men – ay, even to Mars and Venus – just as Julia was relieving her fertile womb and giving birth to abortions that displayed the likeness of her uncle." but modern historians generally regard this as slander against the emperor and the stories were likely invented after his assassination. Julia was deified after her death and Martial wrote a poem where in he praised her and wished for her to become the spiritual guardian of the (hoped for) future son of Domitian and Domitia whom he wished to be named "Julius" in her honor. Following the downfall of her uncle Domitian, their wet nurse Phyllis mixed his ashes with those of Julia to ensure that his remains would not be thrown away.

== Flavian family tree ==
FLAVIAN DYNASTY detailed family tree

Titus Flavius Petro	Tertulla	Vespasius Pollio	Julia the Younger
Titus Flavius Sabinus	Vespasia Polla	Vespasius (praetor)	Aemilia Lepida	Agrippina the Elder	Germanicus
Titus Flavius Sabinus	Vespasian (69–79)	Domitilla the Elder	Flavia (died young)	Junia Lepida	Vistilia
Titus Flavius Sabinus	Domitilla the Younger	Titus (79–81)	Arrecina Tertulla	Cassia Longina	Gnaeus Domitius Corbulo	Caesonia	Caligula (37–41)
Titus Flavius Sabinus	Titus Flavius Clemens	Flavia Domitilla	Julia Flavia	Domitian (81–96)	Domitia Longina	Domitia
Flavius Caesar

== Sources ==
- Suetonius, The Twelve Caesars – Titus & Domitian 17, 22.
- Dio Cassius, lxvii. 3.
- Pliny, Ep. iv. 11. § 6.
- Philostratus, Vit. Apoll. Tyan. vii. 3.
