= Titus Flavius =

Titus Flavius may refer to

- Titus Flavius Vespasianus, the Roman Emperor Titus
- Titus Flavius Domitianus, the Roman Emperor Domitian
- Titus Flavius Sabinus Vespasianus, the Roman Emperor Vespasian
- Titus Flavius Clemens (consul), consul and cousin of Domitian
- Clement of Alexandria
