= Titus Flavius Sabinus (consul AD 69) =

1st century AD Roman senator, general and consul

See also Titus Flavius Sabinus (disambiguation) for other men of this name.

Titus Flavius Sabinus was a Roman senator who was active in the first century AD. He was twice consul suffectus, first in the nundinium of April through June of 69 with his brother Gnaeus Arulenus Caelius Sabinus, and again in May and June of 72 as the colleague of Gaius Licinius Mucianus.

Gavin Townend has identified Sabinus as a nephew of the emperor Vespasian, and the son of Titus Flavius Sabinus, consul in 47, a thesis that has come to be accepted by other scholars. Townend further argued that Sabinus was the father of Titus Flavius Sabinus consul in 82, and Titus Flavius Clemens consul in 95.

== Life ==
Little is known of Sabinus' activities before his consulate. According to Tacitus, Sabinus and his brother were appointed consuls for the second nundinium of the year 69, the Year of the Four Emperors, an arrangement that Otho did not change. However Townend, citing the evidence of an Egyptian papyrus, argued that both Sabini were intended by Nero to have been the consules ordinarii for that year, but Galba had moved them from that prestigious position in the calendar to the nundinium immediately following.

That same year, Sabinus served as a general for Otho, assuming command of a group of gladiators who had been pressed into service on Otho's side and placed under the command of Martius Macer, but had been defeated by a detachment of soldiers supporting Vitellius. Tacitus writes that "the soldiers were delighted by this change of generals, while the generals were led by these continual outbreaks to regard with disgust so hateful a service." Following the defeat and suicide of Otho, Sabinus submitted to Vitellius. As the brothers Sabini had already begun their nundinium as suffect consuls when the decisive First Battle of Bedriacum was fought, Vitellius allowed the brothers to complete their term of office.

Townend also suggests that Sabinus was appointed governor of Pannonia between his two consulates. "Sabinus must have had some claims to be considered a vir militaris," Townend argues in a footnote, "if only as legatus legionis, to be given an active commission by Otho (Hist. II, 36), when so many distinguished soldiers were available on the staff." Other scholars of the period have not been quick to accept this possibility.

== Flavian family tree ==
FLAVIAN DYNASTY detailed family tree

Titus Flavius Petro	Tertulla	Vespasius Pollio	Julia the Younger
Titus Flavius Sabinus	Vespasia Polla	Vespasius (praetor)	Aemilia Lepida	Agrippina the Elder	Germanicus
Titus Flavius Sabinus	Vespasian (69–79)	Domitilla the Elder	Flavia (died young)	Junia Lepida	Vistilia
Titus Flavius Sabinus	Domitilla the Younger	Titus (79–81)	Arrecina Tertulla	Cassia Longina	Gnaeus Domitius Corbulo	Caesonia	Caligula (37–41)
Titus Flavius Sabinus	Titus Flavius Clemens	Flavia Domitilla	Julia Flavia	Domitian (81–96)	Domitia Longina	Domitia
Flavius Caesar

== See also ==
- List of Roman consuls

== Sources ==
- Tacitus, Histories
- Suetonius, Lives of the Twelve Caesars
- Cassius Dio, Roman History

Political offices
Preceded by Lucius Verginius Rufus II, and Lucius Pompeius Vopiscus	Consul of the Roman Empire; 69 with Gnaeus Arulenus Caelius Sabinus	Succeeded by Gnaeus Arrius Antoninus, and Aulus Marius Celsus
Preceded by Vespasian IV, and Titus II as Ordinary consuls	Suffect consul of the Roman Empire; 72 with Gaius Licinius Mucianus II, followed by Marcus Ulpius Traianus	Succeeded by Sextus Marcius Priscus, and Gnaeus Pinarius Aemilius Cicatricula as Suffect consuls
