= Titus Flavius Clemens =

Titus Flavius Clemens may refer to:

- Titus Flavius Clemens (consul), Roman politician and cousin of the emperor Domitian, consul AD 95
- Clement of Alexandria (c. 150 – c. 215), Christian theologian and philosopher
