= Flavius Liberalis =

1st century AD Roman equite, quaestor

Flavius Liberalis was a Roman of the 1st century and was a man of equestrian rank, who came from Ferentium (modern Ferento), a country town in Italy. Liberalis served a quaestor and later a law clerk.

Liberalis had his daughter Flavia Domitilla appear before a board of arbitration to prove her claim for Roman Citizenship, instead of a Latin one. She later married the future Emperor Vespasian. Her children with Vespasian were Domitilla the Younger and Emperors Titus and Domitian.

== Sources ==
- Suetonius, The Twelve Caesars - Vespasian
