= Gnaeus Arulenus Caelius Sabinus =

1st century AD Roman senator and consul

Gnaeus Arulenus Caelius Sabinus was a Roman senator, who was active during the Year of Four Emperors. He was suffect consul in the nundinium of April through June of 69 AD as the colleague of his brother Titus Flavius Sabinus.

Gavin Townend has identified Flavius Sabinus as a nephew of the emperor Vespasian, and the son of Titus Flavius Sabinus, consul in 47, a thesis that has come to be accepted by other scholars. Tacitus describes Caelius Sabinus as the brother of Flavius Sabinus, so the consul of 47 was also his father.

== Life ==
Little is known of Sabinus' activities before his consulate. Politician, jurist and writer, Caelius Sabinus has been the student of Cassius at the Sabinian School, he became the teacher of Iavolenus Priscus. According to Tacitus, Sabinus and his brother were appointed consuls for the second nundinium of the year 69, an arrangement that Otho did not change. However Townend, citing the evidence of an Egyptian papyrus, argued that both Sabini were intended by Nero to have been the consules ordinarii for that year, but Galba had moved them from that prestigious position in the calendar to the nundinium immediately following.

Political offices
Preceded by Lucius Verginius Rufus II, and Lucius Pompeius Vopiscus	Consul of the Roman Empire; 69 with Titus Flavius Sabinus	Succeeded by Gnaeus Arrius Antoninus, and Aulus Marius Celsus
