= Vespasia Polla =

Mother of the Roman emperor Vespasian

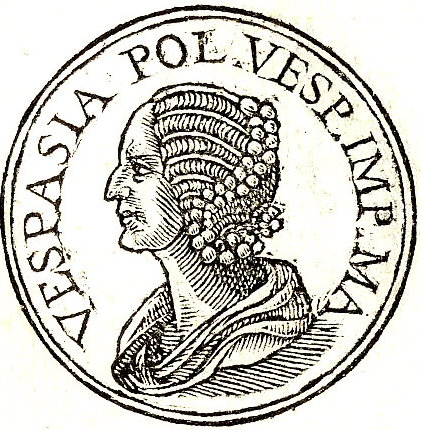
Vespasia Polla from Promptuarii Iconum Insigniorum. The abbreviation stands for: "Vespasia Polla Vespasiani Imperatoris Mater", which means: Vespasia Polla, mother of Emperor Vespasianus

Vespasia Polla (also known as Vespasia Pollia, born c. 15 BC, fl 1st century AD) was the mother of the Roman emperor Vespasian, and grandmother to the emperors Titus and Domitian. Polla came from an equestrian family at Nursia.

Suetonius identifies her father as the Vespasius Pollio who was a three-time military tribune and a praefectus castrorum. Her brother rose as high as the praetorship. The Vespasii were regarded as an old family of great renown, and Suetonius notes a site called Vespasiae where many of their monuments had been built. This site was located on a mountaintop near the sixth milestone on the road between Nursia and Spoletum (present-day Spoleto).

Vespasia married a tax collector Titus Flavius Sabinus, and survived him. Their daughter Flavia Vespasia died in her infancy. One son, also named Titus Flavius Sabinus, served as consul in 47. After her husband died she never remarried.

Sabinus achieved the senatorial rank, but Vespasian put off doing so. Suetonius (Life of Vespasian, 2.2) states that:

only his mother could finally induce him to sue for it. She at length drove him to it, but rather by sarcasm than by entreaties or parental authority, since she constantly taunted him with being his brother's footman.

== Flavian family tree ==
FLAVIAN DYNASTY detailed family tree

Titus Flavius Petro | Tertulla | Vespasius Pollio | Julia the Younger
Titus Flavius Sabinus | Vespasia Polla | Vespasius (praetor) | Aemilia Lepida | Agrippina the Elder | Germanicus
Titus Flavius Sabinus | Vespasian (69–79) | Domitilla the Elder | Flavia (died young) | Junia Lepida | Vistilia
Titus Flavius Sabinus | Domitilla the Younger | Titus (79–81) | Arrecina Tertulla | Cassia Longina | Gnaeus Domitius Corbulo | Caesonia | Caligula (37–41)
Titus Flavius Sabinus | Titus Flavius Clemens | Flavia Domitilla | Julia Flavia | Domitian (81–96) | Domitia Longina | Domitia
Flavius Caesar
