= Horti Domitiae =

Ancient Roman private gardens

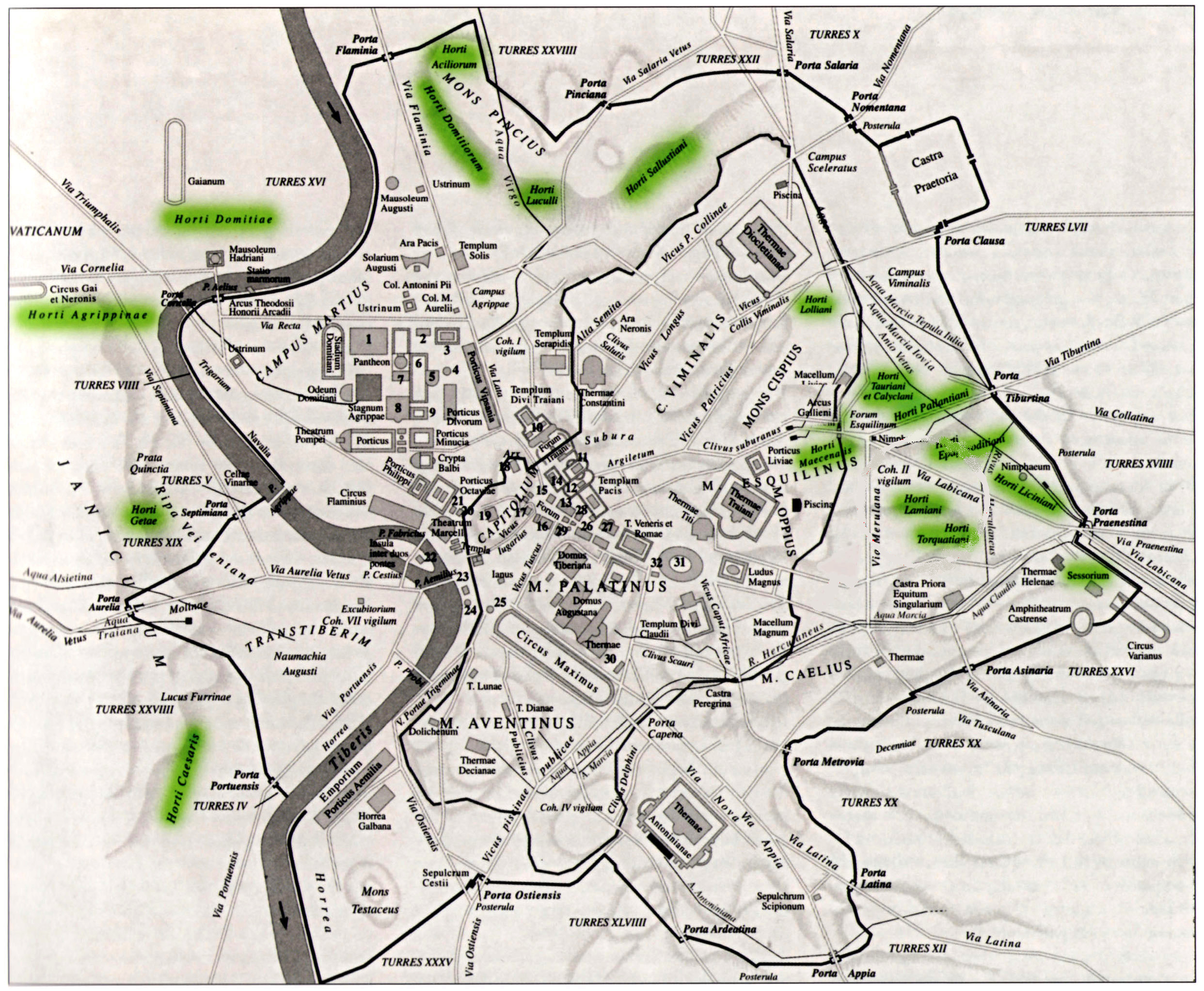
Horti of ancient Rome

The Horti Domitiae were a set of private gardens in ancient Rome, belonging to Domitia Longina, wife of the emperor Domitian. They were situated on the right bank of the river Tiber. A few years later, the Mausoleum of Hadrian was built in the same area. The gardens were still known by this name in the time of Aurelian.

== See also ==
- Roman gardens

== Bibliography ==
- 'Horti', in Platner and Ashby, A Topographical Dictionary of Ancient Rome, London, 1929, pp. 267
