= Axios (acclamation) =

Acclamation adopted by the early church

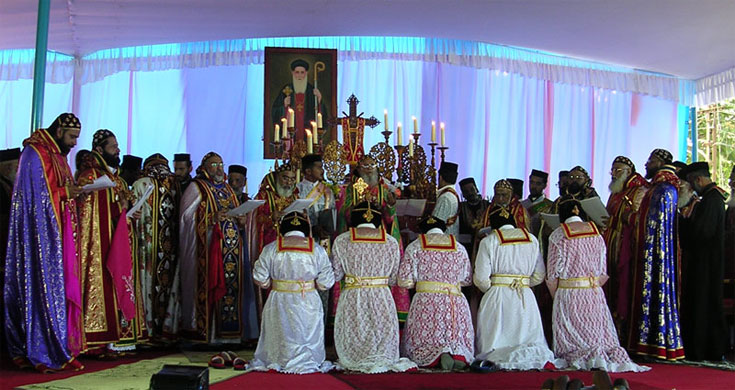
A Syriac Orthodox ordination ceremony.

"Axios!" (Greek ἄξιος, "worthy of", "deserving of", "suitable") is an acclamation adopted by the early Oriental Orthodox Church, Eastern Orthodox church and Byzantine Eastern Catholic churches and made by the faithful at the ordination of bishops, priests and deacons. The acclamation may also be made when a bishop presents an ecclesiastical award to a clergyman during the Divine Liturgy.

== Ordination ==
The ecclesiastical custom has its origins in the early Christianity, when the clergy were elected by the entire church community, including the laity. This was based upon the precedent set in the Acts of the Apostles (1:15–26; 6:2–61). Election and ordination (Greek: cheirotonia - χειροτονία, literally, "laying-on of hands") are two separate actions. The election was accomplished by all, the laying-on of hands by the bishops only (1 Timothy 4:14). Because of the danger of politicizing the process, and because of electoral corruption, the clergy began to be appointed by the episcopate alone (a priest or deacon is appointed by the ruling bishop; a bishop is elected by a synod). A remnant of the election remains at the beginning of the ordination ceremony when the candidate is brought forward and bows first to the people, then to the clergy, and finally to the ordaining bishop—each of the three classes that would have been involved in the election. As he bows to each, a deacon proclaims: "Command!", inviting not only consent but authorization to proceed with the ordination.

== See also ==
- Gnaeus Domitius Corbulo
