= Domitia Longina =

Roman empress from AD 81 to 96

- Augusta
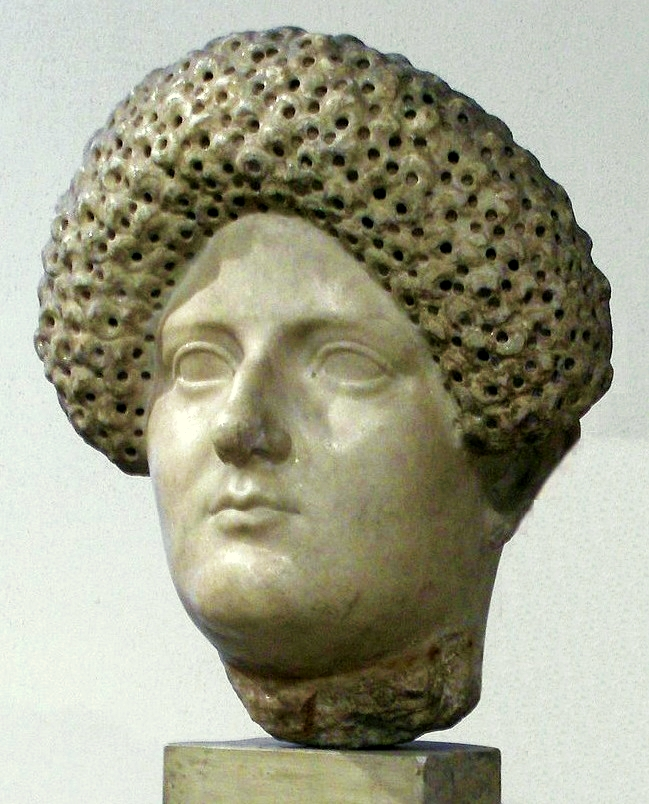
- Bust of Domitia Longina (c. 82–92), National Museum in Warsaw

Roman empress
- Tenure: 14 September 81 – 18 September 96
- Born: c. 50–55
- Died: c. 126–130s
- Spouse: Lucius Aelius Lamia Plautius Aelianus; Domitian
- Issue: By Lamia; Possibly two or more children (Note: See First marriage section for more details.); By Domitian; Flavius Caesar (Note: Died young.); Flavia
Names
- Domitia Longina
- Father: Gnaeus Domitius Corbulo
- Mother: Cassia Longina

Domitia Longina (c. 50–55 – c. 126–130s AD) was a Roman empress and wife to the Roman emperor Domitian. She was the youngest daughter of the general and consul Gnaeus Domitius Corbulo. Domitia divorced her first husband, Lucius Aelius Lamia Plautius Aelianus in order to marry Domitian in AD 71. The marriage produced only one son, whose early death is believed to have been the cause of a temporary rift between Domitia and her husband in 83. She became the empress upon Domitian's accession in 81, and remained so until his assassination in 96. She is believed to have died sometime between AD 126 and 130.

== Early life ==
Born sometime between the years 50 and 55, Domitia Longina was the second daughter of Gnaeus Domitius Corbulo and Cassia Longina. Through her mother she was descended from Augustus, the first Roman emperor, and her paternal aunt was Milonia Caesonia, wife of Caligula. Her father, Corbulo, was one of Rome's most esteemed citizens, both in the Roman Senate and the army. In addition to serving as consul under Caligula, he conducted military campaigns in Germania and Parthia under Claudius and Nero, respectively. However, his family was connected to the failed Pisonian conspiracy against Nero in 65, consequently leading to Corbulo's disgrace and suicide.

== First marriage ==
Little is known about the life of Domitia before her marriage to Domitian, but sometime before 70 she was married to Lucius Aelius Lamia Plautius Aelianus, a man of senatorial rank. She may have been the mother of Lucius Fundanius Lamia Aelianus as well as one or two daughters. It is also possible that Fundanius may have been Longina and Lamia's grandson through a daughter and her husband, Lucius Fundanius, son of a Lucius Fundanius.

== Marriage to Domitian ==
=== Reign of Vespasian and Titus ===
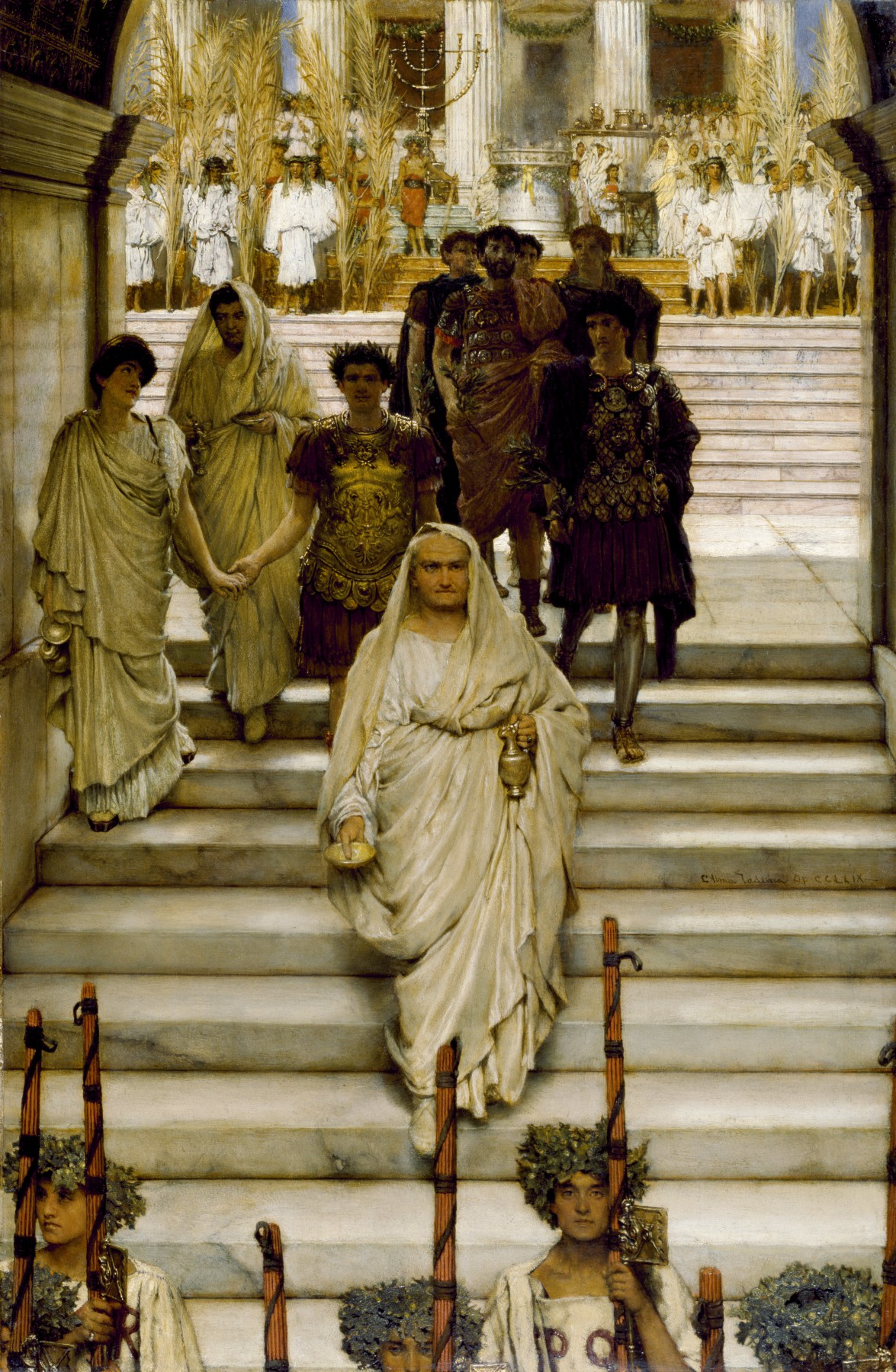
The Triumph of Titus, by Sir Lawrence Alma-Tadema (1885). The composition alludes to the rumoured love affair between Titus (back left) and Domitia Longina (left, next to Domitian).

Following Nero's suicide on 9 June 68, the Roman Empire plunged into a year-long civil war known as the Year of the Four Emperors, which saw the successive rise and fall of the Emperors Galba, Otho and Vitellius. The crisis came to an end with the accession of Vespasian, who re-established peace in the Empire and founded the short-lived Flavian dynasty. In 71, Vespasian attempted to arrange a dynastic marriage between his youngest son Domitian, and the daughter of his eldest son Titus, Julia Flavia. By this time however, Domitian had already met and fallen in love with Domitia Longina, and managed to persuade Lamia to divorce her, so that Domitian could marry her himself. Despite its initial recklessness, the alliance was very prestigious for both families. The new marriage rehabilitated Corbulo's family, while serving the broader Flavian propaganda of the time, which sought to diminish Vespasian's political success under the less reputable emperors of the Julio-Claudian dynasty. Instead connections to Claudius and Britannicus were emphasised, and Nero's victims, or those otherwise disadvantaged by him, rehabilitated.

During this time, Domitian's role in the Flavian government was largely ceremonial. While his elder brother Titus shared almost equal powers with his father, Domitian was left with honours but no responsibilities. This situation remained unchanged when Titus succeeded Vespasian as Emperor on 23 June 79, leading both ancient and modern authors to suggest a mutual animosity between the two brothers. In 80, Titus granted a suffect consulship to Domitia's former husband Aelius Lamia, according to Gsell as a personal insult against Domitian. On another occasion, when Titus urged Lamia to marry again, Lamia asked whether "he too was looking for a wife". In the same year, Domitia and Domitian's only attested son was born. It is not known what the boy's name was, but he died in childhood in 83.

After barely two years in office, Titus unexpectedly died of brain fever on 13 September 81. His last words were reported to have been: "I have made but one mistake". The contemporary historian Suetonius speculated on the possible involvement of Domitian in his brother's death, attributing his final words to a popular rumour of the time, which held that Titus had carried on an affair with Domitia Longina. However even he dismisses the story as highly unlikely.

On 14 September, the Roman Senate confirmed Domitian as Titus' successor, granting tribunician power, the office of Pontifex Maximus, and the titles of Augustus, and Pater Patriae. Consequently, Domitia Longina became Empress of Rome.

=== Empress of Rome ===
Shortly following his accession as Emperor, Domitian bestowed the honorific title of Augusta upon Domitia, while their late son was deified. Both appeared on Domitian's coinage during this time. Nevertheless, the marriage appears to have faced a significant crisis in 83. For reasons unknown, Domitian briefly exiled Domitia, and then soon recalled her, either out of love or amidst rumours he was carrying on a relationship with his niece Julia Flavia. According to Suetonius, Domitia was exiled because of an affair with a famous actor named Paris. When Domitian found out, he allegedly murdered Paris in the street, and promptly divorced his wife. Suetonius further adds that, once Domitia was exiled, Domitian took Julia as his mistress, who later died during a failed abortion.

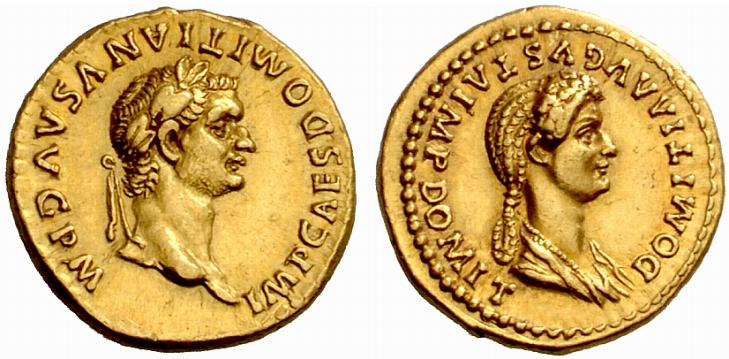
Roman aureus minted in 83 during the reign of Domitian. Domitia appears on the reverse with the honorific title Augusta.

Modern historians consider this highly implausible however, noting that many of these stories were propagated by hostile senatorial authors, who condemned Domitian as a tyrant after his death. Malicious rumours, such as those concerning Domitia's alleged infidelity, were eagerly repeated, and used to highlight the hypocrisy of a ruler publicly preaching a return to Augustan morals, while privately indulging in excesses and presiding over a corrupt court. Domitian did exile his wife, but Jones argues that most likely he did so for her failure to produce an heir. Nevertheless, rumours regarding Domitia's alleged misconduct with Paris circulated even in Domitian's time, and he did not take insults directed at his marriage lightly. Not long after his accession, Aelius Lamia was put to death for the joking remarks made earlier during the reign of Titus. In 93, a son of Helvidius Priscus was executed for having composed a farce satirizing Domitian's separation from his wife. Stories of Domitian's affair with Julia were likely an invention of post-Domitianic writers however.

By 84, Domitia had returned to the palace, where she lived for the remainder of Domitian's reign without incident. Little is known of Domitia's precise activities as Empress, or how much influence she wielded in Domitian's government, but it seems her role was largely limited to ceremonial appearances. From Suetonius, we know that she at least accompanied the Emperor to the theatre, while the Jewish writer Josephus speaks of benefits he received from her. She was also the owner of the Horti Domitiae.

== Later years ==
On 18 September 96, Domitian was assassinated in a palace conspiracy organized by court officials. His body was carried away on a common bier, and unceremoniously cremated by his nurse Phyllis, who mingled the ashes with those of his niece Julia at the Temple of the gens Flavia. The same day, he was succeeded by his friend and advisor, Marcus Cocceius Nerva. Ancient sources have implicated Domitia in the conspiracy against Domitian, either by direct involvement, or advance awareness of the assassination. The historian Cassius Dio, writing more than a century after the assassination, claimed that Domitia chanced upon a list of courtiers Domitian intended to put to death, and passed the information to his chamberlain Parthenius. The story is most likely apocryphal however, with Herodian attributing a similar tale to the assassination of Commodus. According to Jones, the evidence suggests that Domitia remained devoted to Domitian, even after his death. Twenty-five years after her husband's assassination, and despite the fact that his memory had been damned by the Senate, she still referred to herself as "Domitia, wife of Domitian". (Note: Also supported by Levick (2002, p. 211), but disputed by Varner (1995, p. 202).) There has been some speculation among historians that she may have remarried to Gnaeus Domitius Lucanus.

Sometime between 126 and 140, a temple dedicated to Domitia was erected in Gabii. She died peacefully sometime between 126 and the 130s.

== Family tree ==
FLAVIAN DYNASTY detailed family tree

Titus Flavius Petro	Tertulla	Vespasius Pollio	Julia the Younger
Titus Flavius Sabinus	Vespasia Polla	Vespasius (praetor)	Aemilia Lepida	Agrippina the Elder	Germanicus
Titus Flavius Sabinus	Vespasian (69–79)	Domitilla the Elder	Flavia (died young)	Junia Lepida	Vistilia
Titus Flavius Sabinus	Domitilla the Younger	Titus (79–81)	Arrecina Tertulla	Cassia Longina	Gnaeus Domitius Corbulo	Caesonia	Caligula (37–41)
Titus Flavius Sabinus	Titus Flavius Clemens	Flavia Domitilla	Julia Flavia	Domitian (81–96)	Domitia Longina	Domitia
Flavius Caesar

== In later arts ==
- The Roman Actor, a Caroline era stage play, written by Philip Massinger, concerning the alleged affair between Domitia Longina and Paris.
- Domitia (1898). a historical novel by Sabine Baring-Gould
- The Jew of Rome (1935), a historical novel by Lion Feuchtwagner.
- Domitia and Domitian (2000), a historical novel by David Corson based on historical works by Brian Jones and Pat Southern, revolving around the title characters.
- Daughters of Rome (2011) a historical novel by Kate Quinn, which details the lives of Domitia, her sister and two of her cousins during the Year of the Four Emperors. The novel reimagines Domitia's historical origins and instead portrays her as a member of the Cornelia gens called Marcella. The book is a prequel to Quinn's 2010 novel Mistress of Rome, in which Domitia also features.
- Corbulo's Daughter (2019), a historical novel by Anthony Jennings, deals with the relationship between Domitia and the future Emperor Titus from the end of Nero's reign through the sack of Jerusalem to the accession of Vespasian. The book is a prequel to the author's novels The Prophet of Pompeii and Gods of Blood and Water, in which Domitia and Titus also feature.
