= Titus Flavius Petro =

First century BC Roman soldier, and paternal grandfather of the Roman emperor Vespasian

- Known for: Being the paternal father of Vespasian

Titus Flavius Petro was the paternal grandfather of the Roman emperor Vespasian.

What little is known of Petro comes from Suetonius, who says that he was a native of Reate in Latium, and had been one of the loyal soldiers of Pompeius during the Civil War, and might have been a centurion. He escaped capture after the final defeat of the Pompeians at the Battle of Pharsalus in 48 BC, and returned home, eventually receiving Caesar's pardon. He became a publicanus, a collector of taxes on behalf of the Roman Republic.

Suetonius describes Petro's family as obscure, but he could find no evidence to support the claim that his father was from Cisalpine Gaul, and had contracted with the Umbrian and Sabine day laborers who worked the fields around Reate. Petro or Petrus is an Oscan praenomen, and the surname Sabinus, borne by his son, Titus Flavius Sabinus, generally alluded to a claim of Sabine ancestry, indicating that the Flavii were most likely part of the Sabine populace at Reate.

Petro's wife was Tertulla. Their son, Sabinus, followed his father's occupation, but suffered from ill health, and died in the country of the Helvetii around the end of Augustus' reign. Tertulla, who was still living, raised her grandson, the future emperor Vespasian, born in AD 9, on her estate at Cosa. Vespasian was devoted to his grandmother's memory, preserving her villa, and drinking from her silver cup on holidays.

== Family tree ==
FLAVIAN DYNASTY detailed family tree

Titus Flavius Petro	Tertulla	Vespasius Pollio	Julia the Younger
Titus Flavius Sabinus	Vespasia Polla	Vespasius (praetor)	Aemilia Lepida	Agrippina the Elder	Germanicus
Titus Flavius Sabinus	Vespasian (69–79)	Domitilla the Elder	Flavia (died young)	Junia Lepida	Vistilia
Titus Flavius Sabinus	Domitilla the Younger	Titus (79–81)	Arrecina Tertulla	Cassia Longina	Gnaeus Domitius Corbulo	Caesonia	Caligula (37–41)
Titus Flavius Sabinus	Titus Flavius Clemens	Flavia Domitilla	Julia Flavia	Domitian (81–96)	Domitia Longina	Domitia
Flavius Caesar

== See also ==
- Flavia (gens)

== Bibliography ==
- Gaius Suetonius Tranquillus. De Vita Caesarum [Lives of the Caesars, or The Twelve Caesars].
- Chase, George Davis (1897). "The Origin of Roman Praenomina". Harvard Studies in Classical Philology. VIII: 103–184. doi:10.2307/310491. JSTOR 310491.
