= Domitilla the Elder =

Wife of the Roman Emperor Vespasian

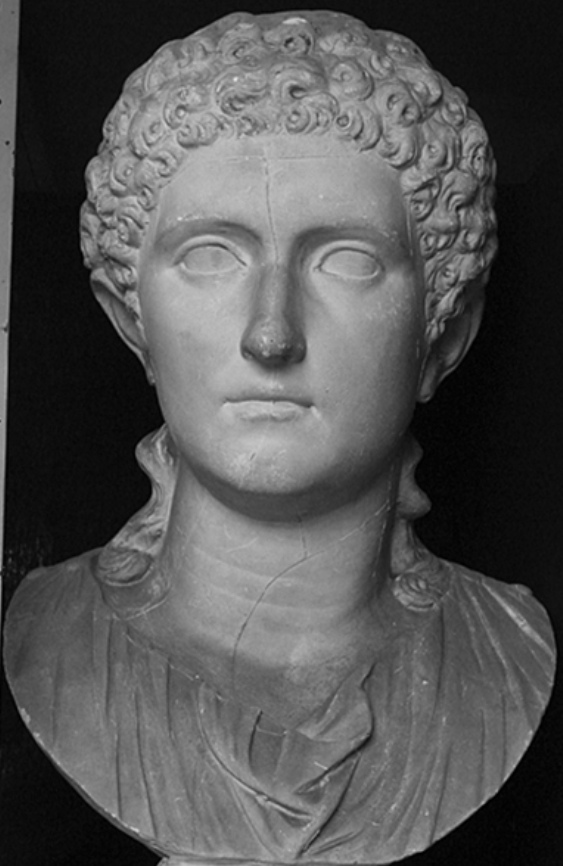
- Bust of Flavia Domitilla Maior
- Died: Before 69 AD
- Spouse: Vespasian
- Issue: Titus; Domitilla the Younger; Domitian
- Dynasty: Flavian (by marriage)
- Father: Flavius Liberalis

Flavia Domitilla Major was the wife of the Roman Emperor Vespasian and mother of the emperors Titus and Domitian. She died before her husband became emperor in 69 AD. After her death she is thought to have been deified by the name Diva Domitilla.

== Life ==
Flavia Domitilla was born in Sabratha to Italic colonists who had moved there during the reign of Augustus. She was the daughter of Flavius Liberalis, a humble quaestor’s clerk from Ferentium (modern Ferento), a country town in Italy. (Note: The 9th century Arabic translation of Orosius's Adversus paganos named Kitāb Hurūšiyūš claims that Domitilla was the sister of Emperor Nero (born Lucius Domitius Ahenobarbus), a statement not found in the original text.)

Before her marriage, she was in residence with Statilius Capella, an equestrian also from Sabratha. Her role in this relationship is characterized by Suetonius with the term delicata (Dom. 3), which in this context is taken to mean "the favorite of" Statilius and is commonly used to imply a sexual relationship between the two. Regardless of the exact circumstances surrounding this relationship, the context suggests that Domitilla filled some servile role within the estate of Statilius. In Suetonius she is described as being of Latin rank (Dom. 3), though in the Epitome de Caesaribus she is designated as a liberta (freedwoman) (Ерit. de Caes. X.1). In a case established by her father, Domitilla's status was raised to that of a freeborn Roman citizen through the approval of the arbiters.

She and Vespasian likely married between the years of 37-39 AD, during the establishment of Vespasian's senatorial career. In addition to the emperors Titus and Domitian, Domitilla and Vespasian also had a daughter by the name Domitilla the Younger.

== Death ==
Both her cause of death and exact date of death are unknown, though Suetonius (Dom. 3) states that both she and her daughter, Domitilla the Younger, passed before Vespasian's acclamation as emperor.

After her death she is often identified with the figure Diva Domitilla, a deified woman of the Flavian dynasty, though there is a debate over whether this title belongs to her or to her daughter. Evidence for her as Diva Domitilla is provided mostly through her representations on the coins issued during the reign of her son, Titus.

== Flavian family tree ==
FLAVIAN DYNASTY detailed family tree

Titus Flavius Petro	Tertulla	Vespasius Pollio	Julia the Younger
Titus Flavius Sabinus	Vespasia Polla	Vespasius (praetor)	Aemilia Lepida	Agrippina the Elder	Germanicus
Titus Flavius Sabinus	Vespasian (69–79)	Domitilla the Elder	Flavia (died young)	Junia Lepida	Vistilia
Titus Flavius Sabinus	Domitilla the Younger	Titus (79–81)	Arrecina Tertulla	Cassia Longina	Gnaeus Domitius Corbulo	Caesonia	Caligula (37–41)
Titus Flavius Sabinus	Titus Flavius Clemens	Flavia Domitilla	Julia Flavia	Domitian (81–96)	Domitia Longina	Domitia
Flavius Caesar

== See also ==
- Vespasian
- Titus
- Domitilla the Younger
- Domitian

== Bibliography ==
- La Monaca, Valeria (2013). "Flavia Domitilla as delicata: A new interpretation of Suetonius, Vesp. 3". Ancient Society. 43: 191–212. JSTOR 44079974.
