= Flavia Domitilla (wife of Clemens) =

1st century Roman noblewoman and daughter of Domitilla the Younger

Flavia Domitilla was a Roman noblewoman of the 1st century AD. She was a granddaughter of Emperor Vespasian and a niece of Emperors Titus and Domitian. She married her second cousin, the consul Titus Flavius Clemens, a grand-nephew of Vespasian through his father Titus Flavius Sabinus.

There is disagreement about whether the Flavia Domitilla mentioned in certain fourth-century and later Christian writings is the same person or another.

== Biography ==
=== Early life ===
Flavia Domitilla was the daughter of Domitilla the Younger by an unknown father, perhaps Quintus Petillius Cerialis, with whom her mother had two sons.

=== Marriage and children ===
A contemporary inscription indicates that Flavia Domitilla and her husband Titus Flavius Clemens had seven children, who were thus grandnephews and grandnieces of Domitian. Suetonius, who was born in 69 and thus a contemporary, states that Domitian designated as the emperor's successors two very young sons of Flavius Clemens, and changed their names to Domitian and Vespasian. Quintilian (c. 35 – c. 100) mentions that Domitian had entrusted to him the tutelage of two grandsons of Domitian's sister, presumably the two boys designated by the emperor as his successors.

Mommsen also claimed that she had a daughter also named Flavia Domitilla who married Titus Flavius Onesimus (Note: See Mommsen's stema here) but later retracted this theory.

=== Banishment ===
Suetonius writes: "Finally he put to death his own cousin Flavius Clemens, suddenly and on a very slight suspicion, almost before the end of his consulship; and yet Flavius was a man of most contemptible laziness and Domitian had besides openly named his sons, who were then very young, as his successors, changing their former names and calling the one Vespasian and the other Domitian. And it was by this deed in particular that he hastened his own destruction." Cassius Dio (c. 155–235) reports in his Roman History: "Domitian slew, along with many others, Flavius Clemens the consul, although he was a cousin and married to Flavia Domitilla, who was also a relative of the emperor's. The charge brought against them both was that of sacrilege or godlessness (Ancient Greek ἀθεότης), a charge on which many others who drifted into Jewish ways were condemned. Some of these were put to death, and the rest were at least deprived of their property. Domitilla was merely banished to Pandateria."

Suetonius says that one of those involved in the assassination of Domitian on 18 September 96 was Domitilla's steward Stephanus.

== Religious traditions ==
=== Jewish ===
Some scholars connect Domitilla with a character in Jewish tradition, a Roman matron in the Talmud (Avodah Zarah 10b) and Deuteronomy Rabbah 2.25. When the emperor had decreed that in 30 days the Senate would confirm an edict to kill all Jews and Christians in the Roman Empire, the Roman matron convinced her husband to stand up for the Jews. In that tradition, Flavius Clemens converted to Judaism after having contact with the great sage Rabbi Akiva.

=== Christian ===
Saint Flavia Domitilla
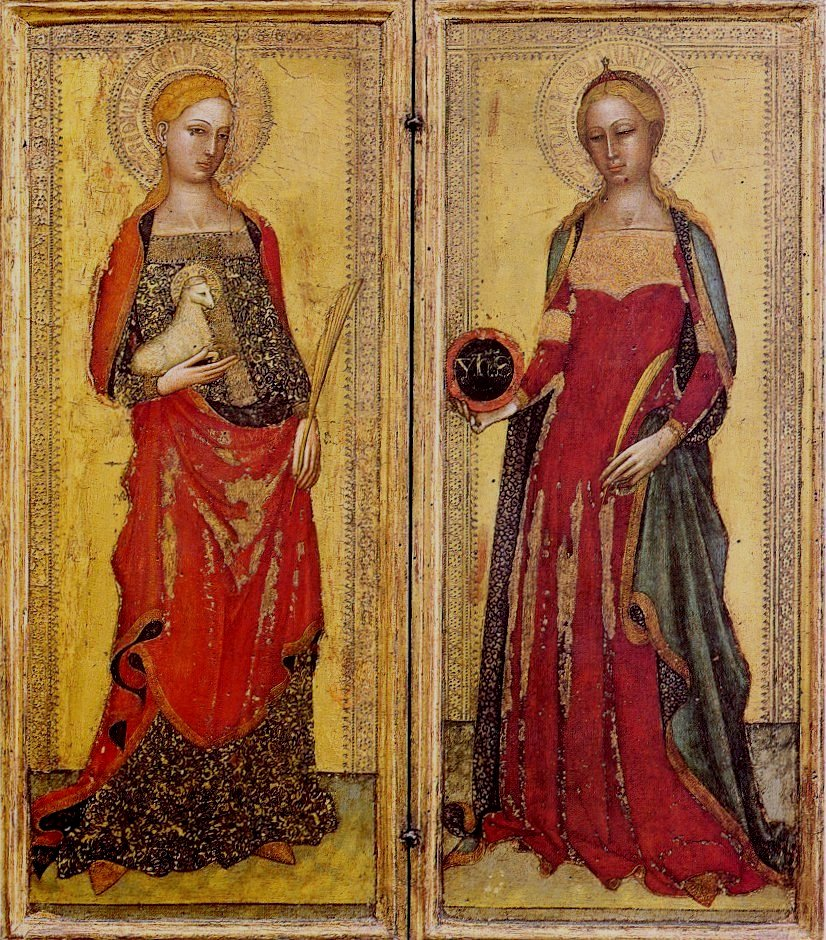
- Andrea di Bonaiuto da Firenze. St. Agnes and St. Domitilla. 1365. Galleria dell'Accademia, Florence.
- Born: 1st century Rome
- Died: 96? Ponza or Ventotene
- Venerated in: Greek Orthodox Church; Catholic Church
- Feast: 7 May (Catholic), 12 May (Orthodox)

Both the Greek Orthodox Church and the Catholic Church celebrate a Flavia Domitilla as a saint.

The Greek Orthodox Church celebrates Saint Flavia Domitilla on 12 May and a publication of the Apostolic Service of the Church of Greece states that she lived in Rome in the first century, that she was the wife of the Roman official Titus Flavius Clemens and a daughter of Emperor Domitian's sister, and that she died a martyr for refusing to sacrifice to idols. This description identifies her with the Flavia Domitilla described above.

The identity of the saint honoured in the Catholic Church, whose feast is now on 7 May, is less clear.

==== Catholic ====
In his Church History, written at the end of 323 or 324, Eusebius, speaking of "writers who were far from our religion", says that "they recorded that in the fifteenth year of Domitian Flavia Domitilla, daughter of a sister of Flavius Clement, who at that time was one of the consuls of Rome, was exiled with many others to the island of Pontia in consequence of testimony borne to Christ."

In his Chronicon, which survives in a translation by Jerome (c. 340–420), Eusebius quotes an earlier writer who gives similar information. Under Year 16 of Domitian in the 218th Olympiad (96 AD, the year of Domitian's assassination), he states: "Brutius writes that there were very many Christian martyrs under Domitian, among whom were Flavia Domitilla, niece (on his sister's side) of Flavius Clemens the consul; she was exiled to the island of Pontia, because she bore witness that she was a Christian."

The identity and religion of this Brutius or Bruttius are uncertain.

George Syncellus, who died after 810, repeats the statement by Eusebius in his Chronicon and adds that Flavius Clemens died for Christ. He is the first to speak of this first-century Roman consul as a Christian. In quoting Eusebius, Syncellus describes Domitilla as Clement's ἐξαδελφή (exadelphe), a term that can mean "cousin" and not only, as Jerome understood it, "niece".

Writing of the death in 404 of Saint Paula, Jerome says that on her way to the Holy Land, "the vessel touched at the island of Pontia ennobled long since as the place of exile of the illustrious lady Flavia Domitilla who under the Emperor Domitian was banished because she confessed herself a Christian; and Paula, when she saw the cells in which this lady passed the period of her long martyrdom, taking to herself the wings of faith, more than ever desired to see Jerusalem and the holy places".

===== One person or two? =====
The information that Eusebius attributes to Brutius about Flavia Domitilla does not agree with what Cassius Dio says of the Flavia Domitilla exiled by Domitian. The Domitilla of Cassius Dio was the wife of Flavius Clemens and was exiled to the island of Pandateria in the context of persons who "drifted into Jewish ways". The Domitilla of Eusebius was the niece of Flavius Clemens and was banished to the island of Pontia for declaring herself a Christian.

The Acts of Saints Nereus and Achilleus, a legend of no historical value composed in the fifth or sixth century, begins by stating that Domitilla was Domitian's niece, but then goes on the speak of her as the consul's niece. Furthermore, it presents Domitilla, not as a wife and mother of seven children but as a formally consecrated Christian virgin, a description absent also from the writings of Eusebius and Jerome.

Some modern scholars posit the existence of two distinct victims of Domitian, each called Flavia Domitilla, both belonging to the same senatorial family. The first to propound this view was Caesar Baronius: no ancient author speaks of two and Suetonius was able to speak of Stephanus, the assassin of Domitian, simply as "the steward of Domitilla" without having to indicate which Domitilla he served.

Others consider it more likely that Domitian banished only one Flavia Domitilla and that there are errors in the texts of either Cassius Dio or Eusebius or of both. They instance the possibility of confusion between the geographically close islands of Pontia and Pandateria.

===== Liturgy =====
Flavia Domitilla is for the first time included in a list of saints in the ninth-century martyrology of Florus of Lyon, in which there is in her regard a long entry based on the Acts of Nobles Nereus and Achilleus and which puts her feast on 7 May, perhaps because the Martyrologium Hieronymianum had on that date a mention of a Saint Flavius. The same martyrology mentions her also on 12 May, the feast of Saints Nereus and Achilleus, saying (again on the basis of these Acts) that these were her eunuchs. The martyrology of Ado of Vienne, in the same century, did the same, but more briefly. The ninth-century Martyrology of Usuard copied that of Ado and was in turn copied by the Roman Martyrology of Caesar Baronius, who gave credence to the legendary Acts of Saints Nereus and Achilleus and in 1595 succeeded in having Domitilla's name added in the General Roman Calendar to those of Nereus and Achilleus on their feast, 12 May.

Until the Roman Martyrology was completely revised in 2001, it had the following entry under 7 May: "At Terracina, in Campania, the birthday of blessed Flavia Domitilla, virgin and martyr, niece of the Consul Flavius Clemens. She received the religious veil at the hands of St Clement, and in the persecution of Domitian was exiled with many others to the island of Pontia, where she endured a long martyrdom for Christ. Taken afterwards to Terracina, she converted many to the faith of Christ by her teaching and miracles. The judge ordered the chamber in which she was, with the virgins Euphrosina and Theodora, to be set on fire, and she thus consummated her glorious martyrdom. She is also mentioned with the holy martyrs Nereus and Achilleus, on the 12th of this month."

The Roman Breviary presented her as the niece not of the Consul Clemens, but of the Emperors Titus and Domitian, and as a virgin, not a wife. Based closely on the Acts of Saints Nereus and Achilleus, it said under the date of 12 May: "The Roman virgin Flavia Domitilla, niece of Emperors Titus and Domitian, after receiving the religious veil of virginity at the hands of blessed Pope Clement, was accused by her fiancé Aurelianus, son of Consul Titus Aurelius, of being a Christian and was banished by Emperor Domitian to the island of Pontia, where she underwent a long martyrdom in prison. Finally, she was taken to Terracina and again confessed to being a Christian. She was always shown to be more and more constant and, under the Emperor Trajan, fire was set, by order of the judge, to her room and, together with her foster sisters Theodora and Euphrosyna, she consummated her glorious martyrdom on 7 May. Their bodies were found intact and were buried by the deacon Caesarius. On this day [12 May] the bodies of the two brothers [Nereus and Achilleus] and Domitilla were brought back from the cardinal-deaconry of Saint Adrian to the basilica of these martyrs, the Titulus Fasciolae."

The translation of the relics in question was arranged with the greatest solemnity by Cardinal Baronius in 1597.

There is thus disagreement between the Roman Breviary of the Tridentine period and the Roman Martyrology of the same period about the identity of Saint Domitilla.

The 2001 decree of promulgation of the revised Roman Martyrology declared: "In accordance with the Constitution Sacrosanctum Concilium of the Second Vatican Ecumenical Council on the Sacred Liturgy, 'the accounts of martyrdom or the lives of the saints are to accord with the facts of history' (art. 92 c), the names of saints included in the Martyrology and their notices have to be subjected more carefully than before to the judgment of historical study."

The Roman Martyrology now states under 7 May: "At Rome, commemoration of Saint Domitilla, martyr, daughter of the sister of Consul Flavius Clemens, who, being accused during the persecution of Emperor Domitian of denying the pagan gods, was, because of her witness to Christ, banished with others to the island of Pontia and there underwent a long martyrdom."

Earlier than that, the name of Domitilla was, in 1969, removed from the General Roman Calendar (into which it was inserted only in 1595), because her liturgical cult has no basis in [Roman] tradition. Accordingly, Domitilla is no longer mentioned on 12 May, the feast of the soldier martyrs Nereus and Achilleus.

== Flavian family tree ==
FLAVIAN DYNASTY detailed family tree

Titus Flavius Petro	Tertulla	Vespasius Pollio	Julia the Younger
Titus Flavius Sabinus	Vespasia Polla	Vespasius (praetor)	Aemilia Lepida	Agrippina the Elder	Germanicus
Titus Flavius Sabinus	Vespasian (69–79)	Domitilla the Elder	Flavia (died young)	Junia Lepida	Vistilia
Titus Flavius Sabinus	Domitilla the Younger	Titus (79–81)	Arrecina Tertulla	Cassia Longina	Gnaeus Domitius Corbulo	Caesonia	Caligula (37–41)
Titus Flavius Sabinus	Titus Flavius Clemens	Flavia Domitilla	Julia Flavia	Domitian (81–96)	Domitia Longina	Domitia
Flavius Caesar

== See also ==
- Aquila of Sinope
- Priscilla and Aquila
- Titus Flavius Clemens (consul)
