= Titus Flavius Sabinus (consul AD 82) =

1st century Roman senator and consul

Titus Flavius T. f. T. n. Sabinus was a Roman senator, who was active during the second half of the first century AD. He was the son of Titus Flavius Sabinus, consul suffectus in AD 69. In that year the younger Sabinus was besieged with his grandfather in the Capitol, but escaped when it was burnt down. He married Julia Flavia, the daughter of his cousin, the future emperor Titus.

Sabinus was consul with his cousin, the emperor Domitian, in AD 82, but was afterwards slain by the emperor, on the frivolous pretext that the herald in proclaiming his consulship had called him Imperator instead of consul. Domitian's love for Sabinus' wife was perhaps the real reason for his death.

Sabinus' brother was Titus Flavius Clemens, consul in 95.

== Family tree ==
FLAVIAN DYNASTY detailed family tree

Titus Flavius Petro	Tertulla	Vespasius Pollio	Julia the Younger
Titus Flavius Sabinus	Vespasia Polla	Vespasius (praetor)	Aemilia Lepida	Agrippina the Elder	Germanicus
Titus Flavius Sabinus	Vespasian (69–79)	Domitilla the Elder	Flavia (died young)	Junia Lepida	Vistilia
Titus Flavius Sabinus	Domitilla the Younger	Titus (79–81)	Arrecina Tertulla	Cassia Longina	Gnaeus Domitius Corbulo	Caesonia	Caligula (37–41)
Titus Flavius Sabinus	Titus Flavius Clemens	Flavia Domitilla	Julia Flavia	Domitian (81–96)	Domitia Longina	Domitia
Flavius Caesar

== Sources ==
- Tacitus, Histories
- Philostratus, Life of Apollonius of Tyana
- Suetonius, Lives of the Twelve Caesars
- Cassius Dio, Roman History

Political offices
Preceded by Lucius Carminius Lusitanicus, and Marcus Petronius Umbrinus as suffect consuls	Consul of the Roman Empire; 82 with Imp. Caesar Domitian Augustus VIII	Succeeded by ? Servaeus Innocens, and Lucius Salvius Otho Cocceianus as suffect consuls
