= Titus Flavius Sabinus (father of Vespasian) =

Father of Roman Emperor Vespasian

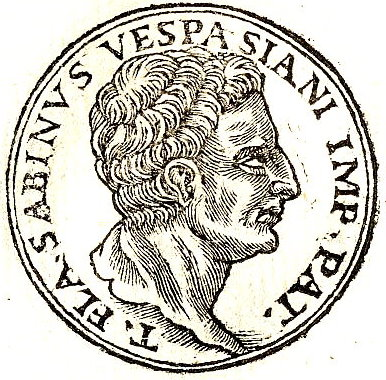
Titus Flavius Sabinus from Promptuarium Iconum Insigniorum (1553)

Titus Flavius T. f. Sabinus was a Roman eques and the father of the emperor Vespasian.

Sabinus came from Reate in the Sabine region of Italy, the son of Titus Flavius Petro and his wife, Tertulla. He served as a customs official and then as a banker in the province of Asia, where he was honoured with statues dedicated "To an Honest Tax-gatherer", and later as a banker at Aventicum among the Helvetii in Gaul, where he died.

With his wife Vespasia Polla he had at least two sons, the consul Titus Flavius Sabinus, and Titus Flavius Vespasianus, the future emperor Vespasian; and also a daughter who died in infancy, Flavia Vespasia.

== Family tree ==
FLAVIAN DYNASTY detailed family tree

Titus Flavius Petro	Tertulla	Vespasius Pollio	Julia the Younger
Titus Flavius Sabinus	Vespasia Polla	Vespasius (praetor)	Aemilia Lepida	Agrippina the Elder	Germanicus
Titus Flavius Sabinus	Vespasian (69–79)	Domitilla the Elder	Flavia (died young)	Junia Lepida	Vistilia
Titus Flavius Sabinus	Domitilla the Younger	Titus (79–81)	Arrecina Tertulla	Cassia Longina	Gnaeus Domitius Corbulo	Caesonia	Caligula (37–41)
Titus Flavius Sabinus	Titus Flavius Clemens	Flavia Domitilla	Julia Flavia	Domitian (81–96)	Domitia Longina	Domitia
Flavius Caesar
