= Domitilla the Younger =

Daughter of Roman emperor Vespasian

Diva Domitilla the Younger
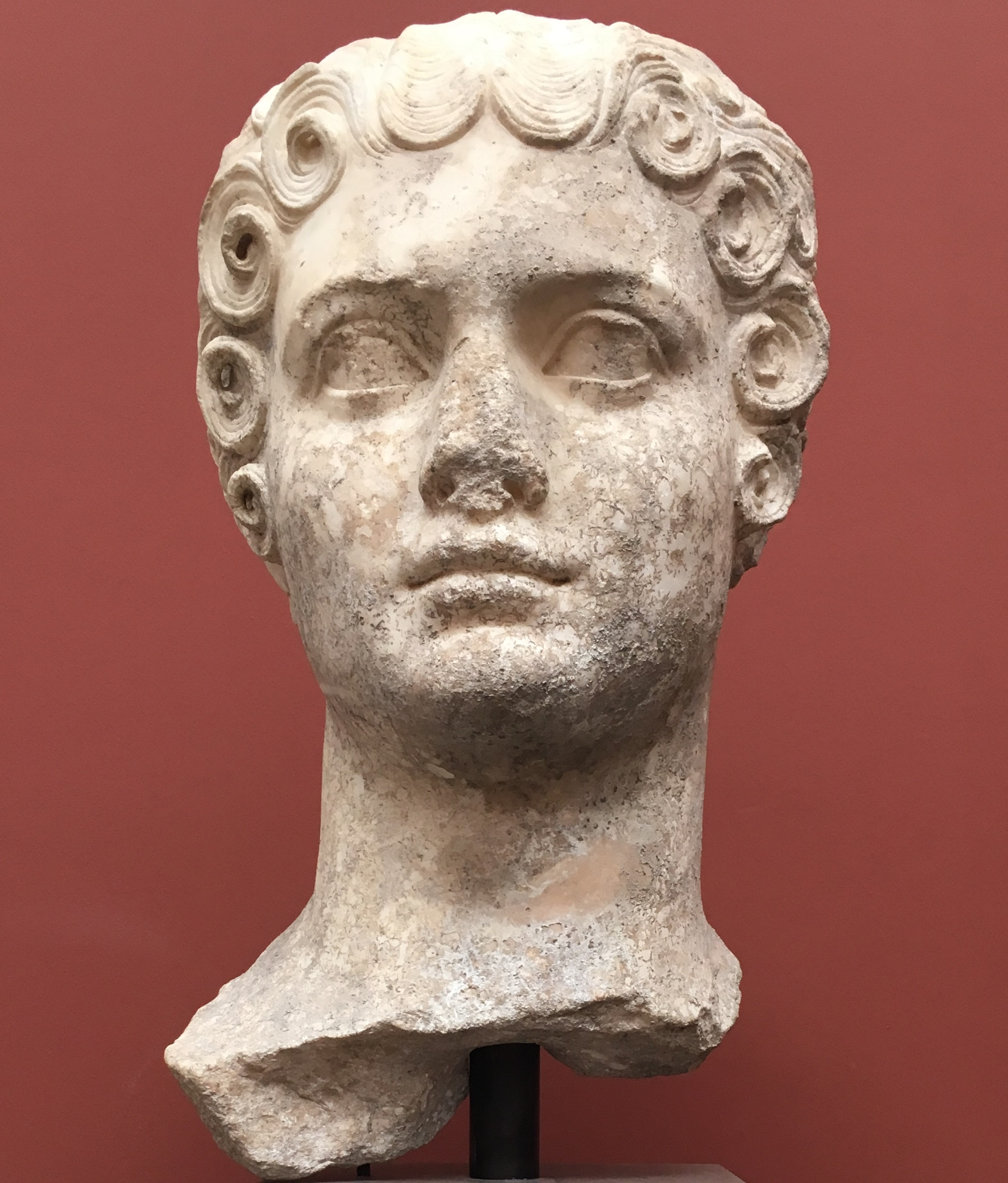
- Head of sculpture of Domitilla Minor
- Born: c.45 AD
- Died: 66 AD
- Title: Augusta
- Spouse: Quintus Petillius Cerialis
- Children: Flavia Domitilla
- Parents: Vespasian (father); Domitilla the Elder (mother)
- Family: Flavian dynasty

Flavia Domitilla the Younger or Flavia Domitilla Minor (c. 45 – c. 66) was the only daughter of the Roman Emperor Vespasian.

== Biography ==
She was the child of Vespasian and his wife Domitilla the Elder. She was born after her brother Titus and before her brother Domitian. At the age of fifteen, she was married to Quintus Petillius Cerialis, with whom she had a daughter, the later Christian saint Flavia Domitilla.

Domitilla died before Vespasian became emperor in 69. She was later deified by her younger brother Domitian, who also bestowed the honorific title of Augusta upon her.

== Flavian family tree ==
FLAVIAN DYNASTY detailed family tree

Titus Flavius Petro	Tertulla	Vespasius Pollio	Julia the Younger
Titus Flavius Sabinus	Vespasia Polla	Vespasius (praetor)	Aemilia Lepida	Agrippina the Elder	Germanicus
Titus Flavius Sabinus	Vespasian (69–79)	Domitilla the Elder	Flavia (died young)	Junia Lepida	Vistilia
Titus Flavius Sabinus	Domitilla the Younger	Titus (79–81)	Arrecina Tertulla	Cassia Longina	Gnaeus Domitius Corbulo	Caesonia	Caligula (37–41)
Titus Flavius Sabinus	Titus Flavius Clemens	Flavia Domitilla	Julia Flavia	Domitian (81–96)	Domitia Longina	Domitia
Flavius Caesar

== See also ==
- List of Roman women
