= Titus Flavius Sabinus (consul AD 47) =

First century Roman politician and provincial governor

Titus Flavius T. f. T. n. Sabinus (d. December 20, AD 69) was a Roman politician and soldier. A native of Reate, he was the elder son of Titus Flavius Sabinus and Vespasia Polla, and brother of the Emperor Vespasian.

== Career ==
Sabinus is first mentioned in the reign of Claudius, in AD 45, when he served as a legate under Aulus Plautius in Britain, along with his brother, Vespasian. He afterwards governed Moesia for seven years. Sabinus was consul suffectus with Gnaeus Hosidius Geta in AD 47, (Note: Older authorities, such as the Dictionary of Greek and Roman Biography and Mythology and Attilio Degrassi, state that he held the fasces in 52. However, Giuseppe Camodeca has shown in his studies of wax tablets conserved at the Ufficio Scavi di Pompei that Sabinus was actually consul for July and August of AD 47.) and was praefectus urbi for the last eleven years of Nero's reign. Upon the ascension of Galba in the year 68, he was replaced as urban prefect by Aulus Ducenius Geminus. However, with the death of Galba, and ascension of Otho in January of 69, Sabinus was reinstated. Sabinus may have been part of the Pisonian conspiracy against Nero, but if so he was never arrested.

Sabinus was an important supporter of his brother; when Vespasian found himself in financial difficulties while governor of Africa, Sabinus lent him the money to continue, although he did demand a mortgage of Vespasian's house and land in return for this assistance. After the death of Otho, Sabinus directed the urban cohorts to swear allegiance to Vitellius, evidently an attempt to preclude further bloodshed. At the same time, the consul Titus Flavius Sabinus, Sabinus' son, directed his troops in northern Italy to submit to the generals of Vitellius. Sabinus continued to retain the dignity of praefectus urbi under Vitellius.

Soon afterward, the legions in the East declared for Vespasian, who then advanced toward Rome, supported by Marcus Antonius Primus. After Vitellius' troops were defeated, the emperor, despairing of success, offered to surrender the empire into the hands of Sabinus, until his brother arrived. However, Vitellius' German soldiers refused this arrangement, and Sabinus was besieged in the Capitol, together with his family members, one of whom was his nephew Domitian. The capitol was burnt by Vitellius' forces, and in the confusion Sabinus' family made their escape, but Sabinus himself was captured and dragged before the emperor, who attempted in vain to save him from the fury of the soldiers. Sabinus was brutally murdered, and his remains thrown down the Gemonian Steps, where the corpses of malefactors and criminals were exposed and disgraced before being thrown into the Tiber river. When the generals of Vespasian obtained possession of the city, Sabinus was interred with the honour of a censor's funeral.

== Character ==
Tacitus describes Sabinus as being fair-minded and honest, though prone to be overly gregarious. His failure to hold the well-fortified capitol during the final days of the civil war is attributed to his moderation, lack of enterprise and reluctance to take Roman lives.

== Family ==
Sabinus' wife is not clearly identified in any ancient sources. Some scholars of early Christianity have asserted that she was Plautia or Plautilla, the daughter of Aulus Plautius and Pomponia Graecina, possibly an early Christian convert, and that the Plautilla who traditionally lent her veil to Saint Paul was Sabinus' daughter. An alternative identification of Sabinus' wife has been proposed by Christian Settipani, who suggests that she was a sister of Marcus Arrecinus Clemens.

An inscription attests to a daughter for Sabinus: Flavia Sabina, who was the wife of Lucius Caesennius Paetus consul in 61. Gavin Townend has identified two sons for Sabinus: Titus Flavius Sabinus and Gnaeus Arulenus Caelius Sabinus, both suffect consuls in the year 69, a thesis that has come to be accepted by other scholars.

FLAVIAN DYNASTY detailed family tree

Titus Flavius Petro	Tertulla	Vespasius Pollio	Julia the Younger
Titus Flavius Sabinus	Vespasia Polla	Vespasius (praetor)	Aemilia Lepida	Agrippina the Elder	Germanicus
Titus Flavius Sabinus	Vespasian (69–79)	Domitilla the Elder	Flavia (died young)	Junia Lepida	Vistilia
Titus Flavius Sabinus	Domitilla the Younger	Titus (79–81)	Arrecina Tertulla	Cassia Longina	Gnaeus Domitius Corbulo	Caesonia	Caligula (37–41)
Titus Flavius Sabinus	Titus Flavius Clemens	Flavia Domitilla	Julia Flavia	Domitian (81–96)	Domitia Longina	Domitia
Flavius Caesar

== See also ==
- Flavia gens

== Bibliography ==
- Flavius Josephus, Bellum Judaïcum (The Jewish War).
- Plutarchus, Lives of the Noble Greeks and Romans.
- Publius Cornelius Tacitus, Historiae.
- Gaius Suetonius Tranquillus, De Vita Caesarum (Lives of the Caesars, or The Twelve Caesars).
- Lucius Cassius Dio Cocceianus (Cassius Dio), Roman History.
- Sextus Aurelius Victor, De Caesaribus (On the Caesars).
- Eutropius, Breviarium Historiae Romanae (Abridgement of the History of Rome).
- Dictionary of Greek and Roman Biography and Mythology, William Smith, ed., Little, Brown and Company, Boston (1849).
- Theodor Mommsen et alii, Corpus Inscriptionum Latinarum (The Body of Latin Inscriptions, abbreviated CIL), Berlin-Brandenburgische Akademie der Wissenschaften (1853–present).
- "Saint Cæcilia and Roman Society", in The Dublin Review, vol. 75 (October, 1874), pp. 314, 315.
- Giuseppe Camodeca, "Novità sui fasti consolari delle tavolette cerate della Campania", in Epigrafia. Actes du colloque international d'épigraphie latine en mémoire de Attilio Degrassi pour le centenaire de sa naissance. Actes de colloque de Rome (27–28 mai 1988), École Française de Rome (1991), pp. 45–74).
- Arnold Blumberg (ed) (1995), Great Leaders, Great Tyrants?: Contemporary Views of World Rulers Who Made History.
- Christian Settipani, Continuité gentilice et continuité sénatoriale dans les familles sénatoriales romaines à l'époque impériale (2000).
- Paul L. Maier, The Flames of Rome: a Novel, Kregel, Grand Rapids, Michigan (1981), ISBN 978-0-8254-4354-1.

Political offices
Preceded by Gaius Calpetanus Rantius Sedatus, and Marcus Hordeonius Flaccus as Suffect consuls	Roman consul 47 (suffect) with Gnaeus Hosidius Geta	Succeeded by Lucius Vagellius as Suffect consul
