= Titus Flavius Clemens (consul) =

1st century Roman politician and cousin of emperor Domitian

Titus Flavius T. f. T. n. Clemens (d. AD 95) was a Roman politician and cousin of the emperor Domitian, with whom he served as consul from January to April in AD 95. Shortly after leaving the consulship, Clemens was executed, allegedly for atheism, although the exact circumstances remain unclear. Over time, he came to be regarded as an early Christian martyr.

== Biography ==
Clemens was the son of Titus Flavius Sabinus, consul suffectus in AD 69, and a brother of Titus Flavius Sabinus, consul in AD 82. The emperor Vespasian was his paternal great-uncle, while the emperors Titus and Domitian were his father's cousins.

As a child, Clemens was besieged along with his family in the capitol, while his great-uncle Vespasian's soldiers were approaching Rome. His grandfather, Vespasian's brother Titus Flavius Sabinus, consul in AD 47, was captured and slain by the forces of Vitellius, who burnt the capitol, but the rest of the family escaped.

Clemens' brother was consul with Domitian, shortly after the latter's accession, but the emperor put his cousin to death on the pretext that the herald proclaiming him consul had called him Imperator. Suetonius claims that Domitian was motivated by his love for his cousin's wife, Julia Flavia (who, as the daughter of his brother Titus, was also his niece).

Clemens also married one of his second cousins, Flavia Domitilla, daughter of Vespasian's daughter, Domitilla, who was thus also a niece of Domitian. They had two sons, whom Domitian intended to succeed him in the empire, renaming one of them Vespasian and the other Domitian. In AD 95, Clemens served as consul alongside the emperor from January to April. He was executed shortly after leaving the consulship at the end of April.

According to Cassius Dio, Clemens was put to death on a charge of atheism, for which, he adds, many others who went over to the Jewish opinions were executed. This may imply that Clemens had converted to Christianity. For the same reason, his wife was banished to Pandataria. The Christian author Eusebius mentions Clemens without saying anything about his belief. Some scholars identify Clemens with "Ketia bar Shalom", whom the Talmud described as a Roman senator who converted to Judaism and managed to save the Jews from a decree of persecution, before himself being executed.

== Flavian family tree ==
FLAVIAN DYNASTY detailed family tree

Titus Flavius Petro	Tertulla	Vespasius Pollio	Julia the Younger
Titus Flavius Sabinus	Vespasia Polla	Vespasius (praetor)	Aemilia Lepida	Agrippina the Elder	Germanicus
Titus Flavius Sabinus	Vespasian (69–79)	Domitilla the Elder	Flavia (died young)	Junia Lepida	Vistilia
Titus Flavius Sabinus	Domitilla the Younger	Titus (79–81)	Arrecina Tertulla	Cassia Longina	Gnaeus Domitius Corbulo	Caesonia	Caligula (37–41)
Titus Flavius Sabinus	Titus Flavius Clemens	Flavia Domitilla	Julia Flavia	Domitian (81–96)	Domitia Longina	Domitia
Flavius Caesar

== See also ==
- Conversion to Judaism
- Jewish-Roman wars

== Bibliography ==
- Gaius Suetonius Tranquillus, De Vita Caesarum (Lives of the Caesars, or The Twelve Caesars).
- Lucius Flavius Philostratus, The Life of Apollonius of Tyana.
- Eusebius of Caesarea, Historia Ecclesiastica.
- Eusebius Sophronius Hieronymus (St. Jerome), Epistulae.
- Annibale Albani, T. Flavii Clementis Viri Consularis et Martyris Tumulus illustratis, Urbino (1727).
- Dictionary of Greek and Roman Biography and Mythology, William Smith, ed., Little, Brown and Company, Boston (1849).
- Franz Xaver Kraus, Roma Sotterranea: Die Römische Katakomben, Herder, Freiburg-in-Breisgau (1873), p. 41.
- Heinrich Grätz, Die Jüdischen Proselyten im Römerreiche unter den Kaisern Domitian, Nerva, Trajan und Hadrian (1884), pp. 28 et seq.
- Heinrich Grätz, Geschichte der Juden von den ältesten Zeiten bis auf die Gegenwart, 3d ed., vol. iv, p. 403.
- Lebrecht, in Abraham Geiger, Jüd. Zeit., vol. xi., p. 273.
- Abraham Berliner, Geschichte der Juden in Rom, von der ältesten Zeit bis zur Gegenwalt, J. Kaufmann, Frankfurt am Mein (1893), p. 39.
- Théodore Reinach, Fontes rerum Judaicarum, vol. i, p. 195.
- Paul von Rohden, Elimar Klebs, & Hermann Dessau, Prosopographia Imperii Romani (The Prosopography of the Roman Empire), Berlin (1898), vol. ii. p. 81.
- Gavin Townend, "Some Flavian Connections", in Journal of Roman Studies, No. 51 (1961).
- John D. Grainger, Nerva and the Roman Succession Crisis of AD 96–99, Routledge (2004).
- Weiß, Alexander. "Soziale Elite und Christentum. Studien zu ordo-Angehörigen unter den frühen Christen." Berlin/Boston: De Gruyter (2015), pp. 157–160.

Political offices
Preceded by Lucius Silius Decianus, and Titus Pomponius Bassus as Suffect consuls	Consul of the Roman Empire; 95 with Domitian XVII, followed by Lucius Neratius Marcellus	Succeeded by Aulus Bucius Lappius Maximus II, and Publius Ducenius Verus as Suffect consuls
