= Gnaeus Domitius Corbulo =

Roman general (c. AD 7 - 67)

- Born: c. 7 AD; Peltuinum
- Died: 67
- Spouse: Cassia Longina
- Issue: Domitia Longina

Gnaeus Domitius Corbulo (Peltuinum c. AD 7 – 67) was a popular Roman general, brother-in-law of the emperor Caligula and father-in-law of Domitian. The emperor Nero, highly fearful of Corbulo's reputation, ordered him to commit suicide, which the general carried out faithfully, exclaiming "Axios", meaning "I am worthy", and fell on his own sword.

== Ancestry ==
Corbulo was born somewhere on the Italian peninsula into a senatorial family. His father, who shared the same name, entered the Senate as a formal praetor under Tiberius. His mother Vistilia came from a family which held the praetorship.

== Military and political career ==
=== Reign of Caligula ===
Corbulo's early career is unknown but he was suffect consul in AD 39 during the reign of Caligula, his brother-in-law through Caligula's marriage to Corbulo's half-sister Milonia Caesonia.

=== In Germania Inferior ===
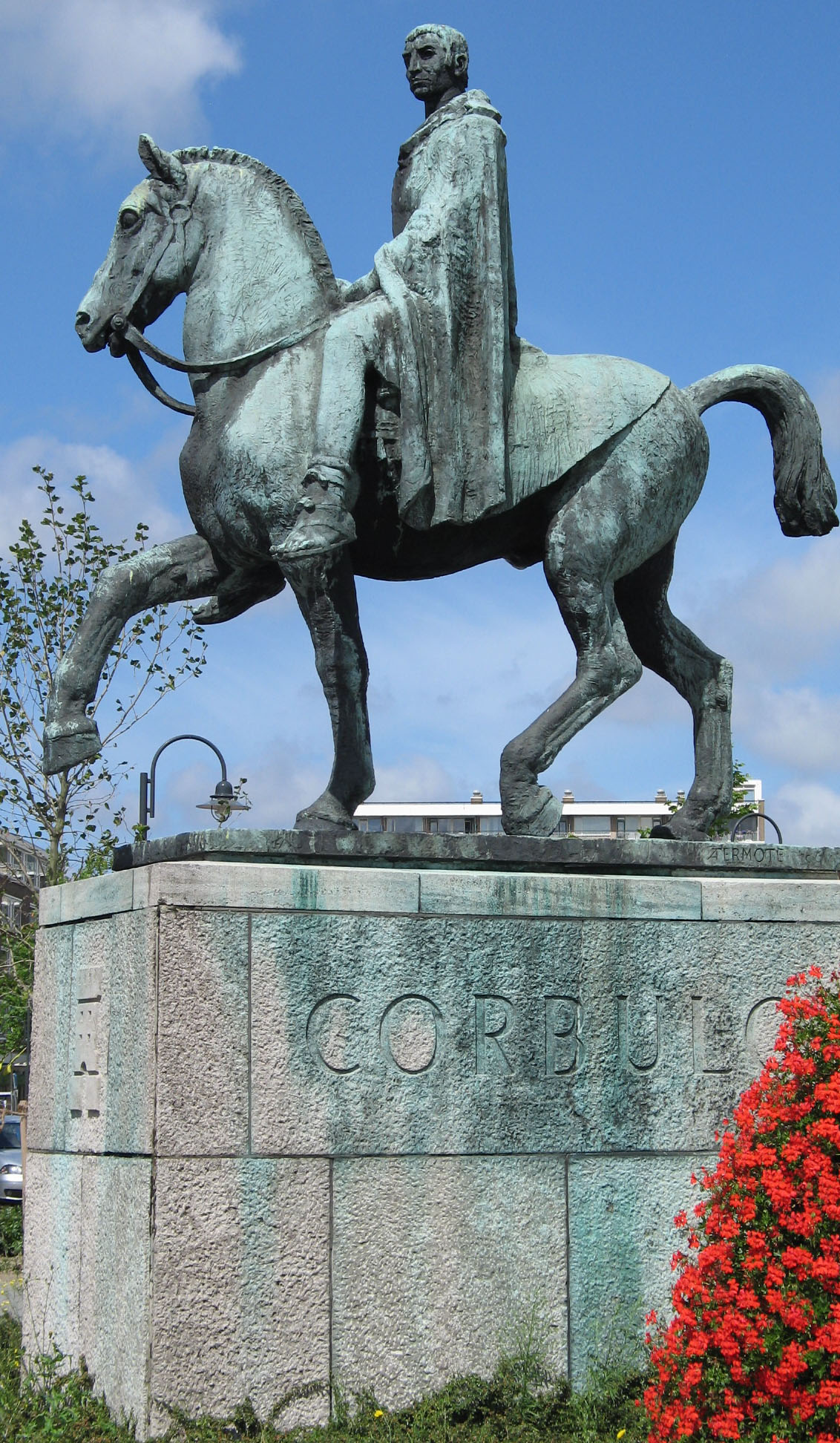
Statue of Corbulo in Voorburg, Netherlands

After Caligula's assassination, Corbulo's career came to a halt until, in AD 47, the new Emperor Claudius made him commander of the armies in Germania Inferior, with a base camp in Colonia (Cologne).

The new assignment was a difficult one and Corbulo had to deal with major rebellions by the Germanic Cherusci and Chauci tribes. During his stay in Germania, the general ordered the construction of a canal between the rivers Rhine and Meuse. Parts of this engineering work, known as Fossa Corbulonis or Corbulo's Canal, have been found at archaeological digs. It ran largely parallel to the modern-day Vliet canal, which connects the modern towns of Leiden (ancient Matilo) and Voorburg (Forum Hadriani). Upon reaching lower Germania, Corbulo employed both the army and naval squadrons of the fleet patrolling the Rhine and the North Sea, eventually expelling the Chauci away from the Roman Provinces and instituting a rigorous training program in order to ensure maximum effectiveness of his legions. He supposedly executed two legionaries after they were found to have laid aside their swords when labouring in the construction of fortifications on a marching camp. Corbulo is purported to have said, "You defeat the enemy with a pickaxe."

=== In the east ===
Corbulo returned to Rome, where he stayed until AD 52, when he was named governor of the province of Asia. Following Claudius' death in AD 54, the new emperor Nero sent him to the eastern provinces to deal with the Armenian question. After some delay, and reinforced by troops from Germania, in AD 58 he took the offensive, and attacked Tiridates, King of Armenia and brother of Vologases I of Parthia. Artaxata and Tigranocerta were captured by his legions (III Gallica, VI Ferrata, and X Fretensis), and Tigranes, who had been brought up in Rome and was an obedient servant of the government, was installed as king of Armenia.

In AD 61 Tigranes invaded Adiabene, an integral portion of the Parthian Kingdom, and a conflict between Rome and Parthia seemed unavoidable. Instead, Vologases thought it better to come to terms. It was agreed that both Roman and Parthian troops should evacuate Armenia, that Tigranes should be dethroned, and the rule of Tiridates recognized. The Roman government declined to accede to these arrangements, and Lucius Caesennius Paetus, governor of Cappadocia, was ordered to settle the question by bringing Armenia under direct Roman administration.

The protection of Syria claimed all of Corbulo's attention in the meantime. Paetus, a weak and incapable commander who "despised the fame acquired by Corbulo", suffered a severe defeat at Rhandeia in AD 62, where he was surrounded and forced to capitulate to the Parthians and evacuated to Armenia. Command was again entrusted to Corbulo. In AD 63, with a strong army, he crossed the Euphrates. Tiridates declined to give battle and arranged a peace treaty. At Rhandea he laid down his diadem at the foot of the emperor's statue, promising not to resume it until he received it from the hand of Nero himself in Rome.

=== Fall and death ===
After two failed plots by noblemen and senators to overthrow Nero, one involving Corbulo's son-in-law and senator Lucius Annius Vinicianus, Nero became suspicious of Corbulo and his support among the Roman masses. In AD 67 disturbances broke out in Judaea and Nero, ordering Vespasian to take command of the Roman forces, summoned Corbulo, as well as two brothers who were the governors of Upper and Lower Germania, to Greece. On his arrival at Cenchreae, the port of Corinth, messengers from Nero met Corbulo and ordered him to commit suicide. Undaunted, he strode forward to accept his fate, and fell on his own sword after exclaiming, "Axios!", meaning, “I have deserved it.”

== Works ==
Corbulo wrote a now-lost account of his Asiatic experiences.

== Marriage and issue ==
Corbulo married Cassia Longina, the daughter of Gaius Cassius Longinus, consul of 30, and his wife Junia Lepida, a great-great-granddaughter of Augustus. Cassia bore Corbulo two daughters, one of whom married the senator Annius Vinicianus, and the other, Domitia Longina, married the emperor Domitian.

== In popular culture ==
Corbulo appeared in The Legion portrayed by Mickey Rourke.

== Notes ==
Political offices
| Preceded by Quintus Sanquinius Maximus, and Lucius Apronius Caesianus as Suffect consuls | Suffect consul of the Roman Empire; 39 with ignotus | Succeeded by Aulus Didius Gallus, and Gnaeus Domitius Afer as Suffect consuls |
