= Domitian =

Roman emperor from AD 81 to 96

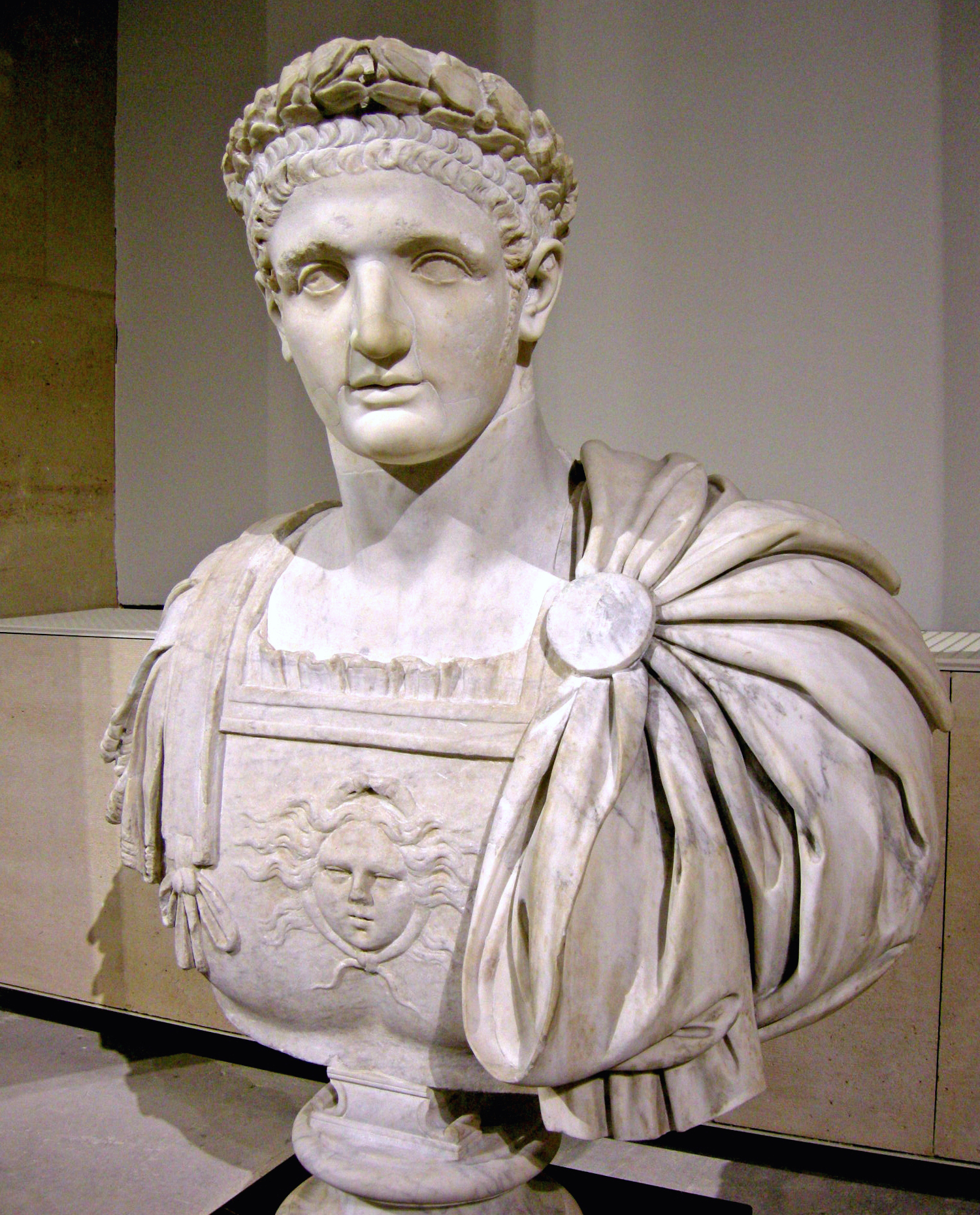
- Bust in the Louvre

Roman emperor
- Reign: 14 September 81 – 18 September 96
- Predecessor: Titus
- Successor: Nerva
- Born: Titus Flavius Domitianus; 24 October 51; Rome, Italy, Roman Empire
- Died: 18 September 96 (aged 44); Rome, Italy
- Burial: Rome
- Spouse: Domitia Longina (m. 70)
- Issue: Titus Flavius Caesar; Flavia (Note: Both children died young and were deified.); Vespasian Minor (possibly adopted); Domitian Minor (possibly adopted)
Names
- Caesar Domitianus (69–81)
Regnal name
- Imperator Caesar Domitianus Augustus
- Dynasty: Flavian
- Father: Vespasian
- Mother: Domitilla

Domitian (/dəˈmɪʃən, -iən/ də-MISH-ən, -ee-ən; Latin: Domitianus; 24 October 51 – 18 September 96) was Roman emperor from 81 to 96. As the son of Vespasian and the younger brother of Titus, his two predecessors on the throne, he was the last member of the Flavian dynasty. Described by the historian Brian W. Jones as "a ruthless but efficient autocrat", his authoritarian style of ruling put him at sharp odds with the Senate, whose powers he drastically curtailed.

Domitian had a minor and largely ceremonial role during the reigns of his father and brother. After the death of his brother, Domitian was declared emperor by the Praetorian Guard. His 15-year reign was the longest since Tiberius. (Note: The closest reigns to 15 years were Claudius' and Nero's, and it was soon to be surpassed by Trajan's 19 years.) As emperor, Domitian strengthened the economy by revaluing the Roman coinage, expanded the border defenses of the empire, and initiated a massive building program to restore the damaged city of Rome. Significant wars were fought in Britain, where his general Agricola made significant gains in his attempt to conquer Caledonia (Scotland), and in Dacia (modern-day Romania), where Domitian was unable to achieve a decisive victory against King Decebalus. Domitian's government exhibited strong authoritarian characteristics. Religious, military, and cultural propaganda fostered a cult of personality, and by nominating himself as perpetual censor, he sought to control public and private morals.

As a consequence, Domitian was popular with the people and the army, but considered a tyrant by members of the Roman Senate. Domitian's reign came to an end in 96 when he was assassinated by court officials. He was succeeded the same day by his advisor Nerva. After his death, Domitian's memory was condemned to oblivion by the Senate, while senatorial and equestrian authors such as Tacitus, Pliny the Younger, and Suetonius propagated the view of Domitian as a cruel and paranoid tyrant. Modern revisionists have instead characterized Domitian as a ruthless but efficient autocrat whose cultural, economic, and political programs provided the foundation of the peaceful second century.

== Early life ==
=== Background and family ===
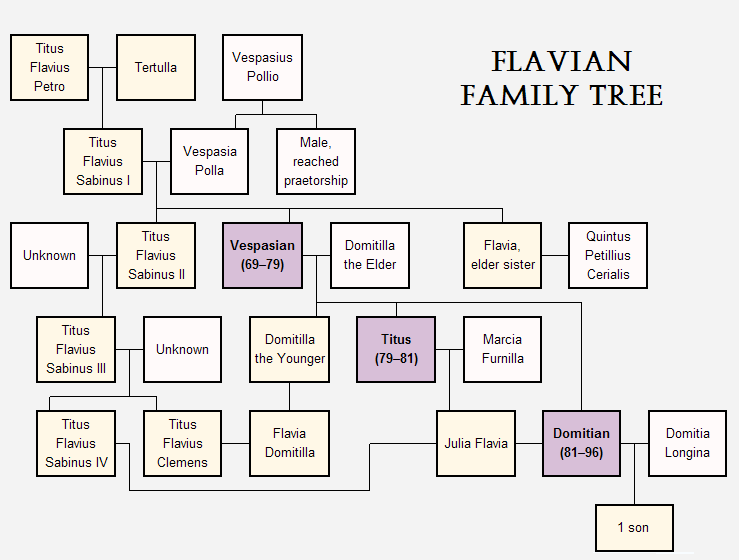
The Flavian family tree, indicating the descendants of Titus Flavius Petro and Tertulla

Domitian was born in Rome on 24 October 51, the youngest son of Titus Flavius Vespasianus—commonly known as Vespasian—and Flavia Domitilla Major. He had an older sister, Domitilla the Younger, and brother, also named Titus Flavius Vespasianus. Decades of civil war during the 1st century BC had contributed greatly to the demise of the old aristocracy of Rome, which a new Italian nobility gradually replaced in prominence during the early part of the 1st century. One such family, the Flavians, or Flavia gens, rose from relative obscurity to prominence in just four generations, acquiring wealth and status under the emperors of the Julio-Claudian dynasty.

Domitian's great-grandfather, Titus Flavius Petro, had served as a centurion under Pompey during Caesar's civil war. His military career ended in disgrace when he fled the battlefield at the Battle of Pharsalus in 48 BC. Nevertheless, Petro managed to improve his status by marrying the extremely wealthy Tertulla, whose fortune guaranteed the upward mobility of Petro's son Titus Flavius Sabinus, Domitian's grandfather. Sabinus himself amassed further wealth and possible equestrian status through his services as tax collector in Asia and banker in Helvetia (modern Switzerland). By marrying Vespasia Polla he allied the Flavian family to the more prestigious gens Vespasia, ensuring the elevation of his sons Titus Flavius Sabinus and Vespasian to senatorial rank.

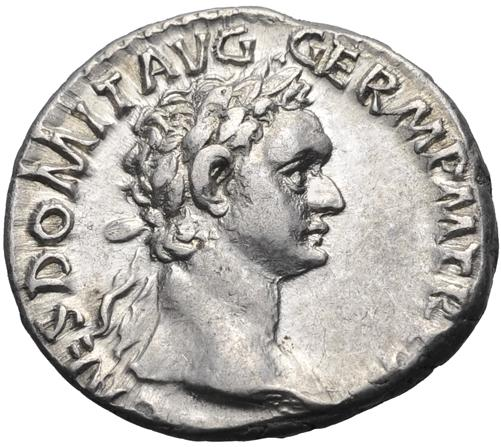
A denarius of Domitian. Inscription: CAES. DOMIT. AVG. GERM. P. M., TR. P. XIIII.

The political career of Vespasian included the offices of quaestor, aedile, and praetor, and culminated in a consulship in 51, the year of Domitian's birth. As a military commander, Vespasian gained early renown by participating in the Roman invasion of Britain in 43. Nevertheless, ancient sources allege poverty for the Flavian family at the time of Domitian's upbringing, even claiming Vespasian had fallen into disrepute under the emperors Caligula (37–41) and Nero (54–68). Modern history has refuted these claims, suggesting these stories later circulated under Flavian rule as part of a propaganda campaign to diminish success under the less reputable Emperors of the Julio-Claudian dynasty and to maximize achievements under Emperor Claudius (41–54) and his son Britannicus.

By all appearances, the Flavians enjoyed high imperial favour throughout the 40s and 60s. While Titus received a court education in the company of Britannicus, Vespasian pursued a successful political and military career. Following a prolonged period of retirement during the 50s, he returned to public office under Nero, serving as proconsul of the Africa Province in 63, and accompanying the emperor Nero during an official tour of Greece in 66. That same year Jews from the Province of Judaea revolted against the Roman Empire, sparking what is now known as the First Jewish–Roman War. Vespasian was assigned to lead the Roman army against the insurgents, with Titus—who had completed his military education by this time—in charge of a legion.

=== Youth and character ===
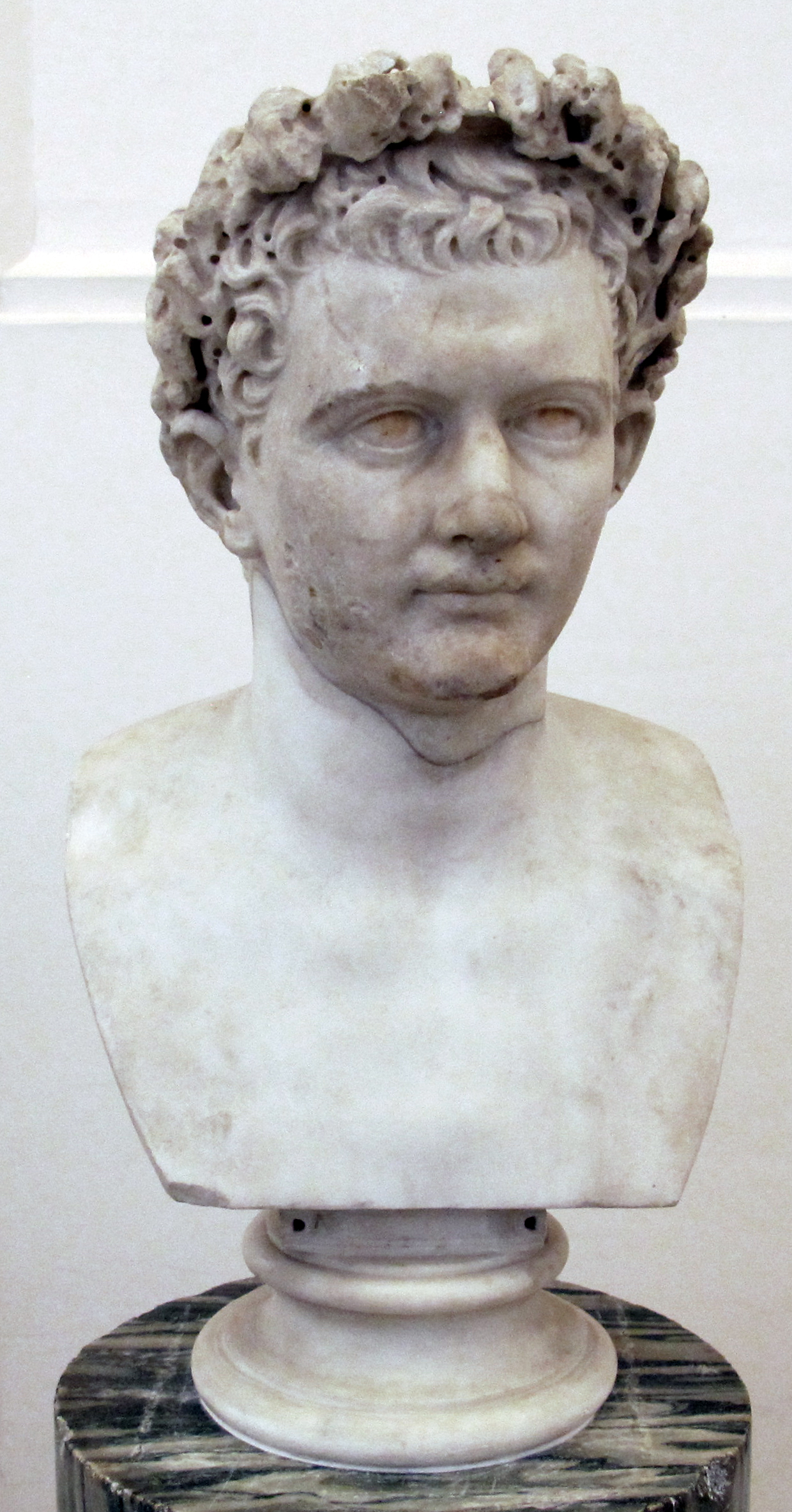
Bust of Domitian with the Civic Crown, 75–81 AD, Farnese Collection, Naples

Of the three Flavian emperors, Domitian would rule the longest, despite the fact that his youth and early career were largely spent in the shadow of his older brother. Titus had gained military renown during the First Jewish–Roman War. After their father Vespasian became emperor in 69 following the civil war known as the Year of the Four Emperors, Titus held a great many offices, while Domitian received honours, but no responsibilities. By the time he was 16 years old, Domitian's mother and sister had long since died, while his father and brother were continuously active in the Roman military, commanding armies in Germania and Judaea. For Domitian, this meant that a significant part of his adolescence was spent in the absence of his near relatives.

During the Jewish–Roman wars, he was likely taken under the care of his uncle Titus Flavius Sabinus II, at the time serving as city prefect of Rome; or possibly even Marcus Cocceius Nerva, a loyal friend of the Flavians and the future successor to Domitian. He received the education of a young man of the privileged senatorial class, studying rhetoric and literature. In his biography in the Lives of the Twelve Caesars, Suetonius attests to Domitian's ability to quote the important poets and writers such as Homer or Virgil on appropriate occasions, and describes him as a learned and educated adolescent, with elegant conversation. Among his first published works were poetry, as well as writings on law and administration. Unlike his brother Titus, Domitian was not educated at court. Whether he received formal military training is not recorded, but according to Suetonius, he displayed considerable marksmanship with the bow and arrow. A detailed description of Domitian's appearance and character is provided by Suetonius, who devotes a substantial part of his biography to his personality:

He was tall of stature, with a modest expression and a high colour. His eyes were large, but his sight was somewhat dim. He was handsome and graceful too, especially when a young man, and indeed in his whole body with the exception of his feet, the toes of which were somewhat cramped. In later life he had the further disfigurement of baldness, a protruding belly, and spindling legs, though the latter had become thin from a long illness.

Domitian was allegedly extremely sensitive regarding his baldness, which he disguised in later life by wearing wigs. According to Suetonius, he even wrote a book on the subject of hair care. With regard to Domitian's personality, however, the account of Suetonius alternates sharply between portraying Domitian as the emperor-tyrant, a man both physically and intellectually lazy, and the intelligent, refined personality drawn elsewhere. Historian Brian Jones concludes in The Emperor Domitian that assessing the true nature of Domitian's personality is inherently complicated by the bias of the surviving sources. Common threads nonetheless emerge from the available evidence. He appears to have lacked the natural charisma of his brother and father. He was prone to suspicion, displayed an odd, sometimes self-deprecating sense of humour, and often communicated in cryptic ways. This ambiguity of character was further exacerbated by his remoteness, and as he grew older, he increasingly displayed a preference for solitude, which may have stemmed from his isolated upbringing. Indeed, by the age of eighteen nearly all of his closest relatives had died by war or disease. Having spent the greater part of his early life in the twilight of Nero's reign, Domitian's formative years would have been strongly influenced by the political turmoil of the 60s, culminating with the civil war of 69, which brought his family to power.

== Rise of the Flavians ==
=== Year of the Four Emperors ===
The Roman Empire in the Year of the Four Emperors (69)

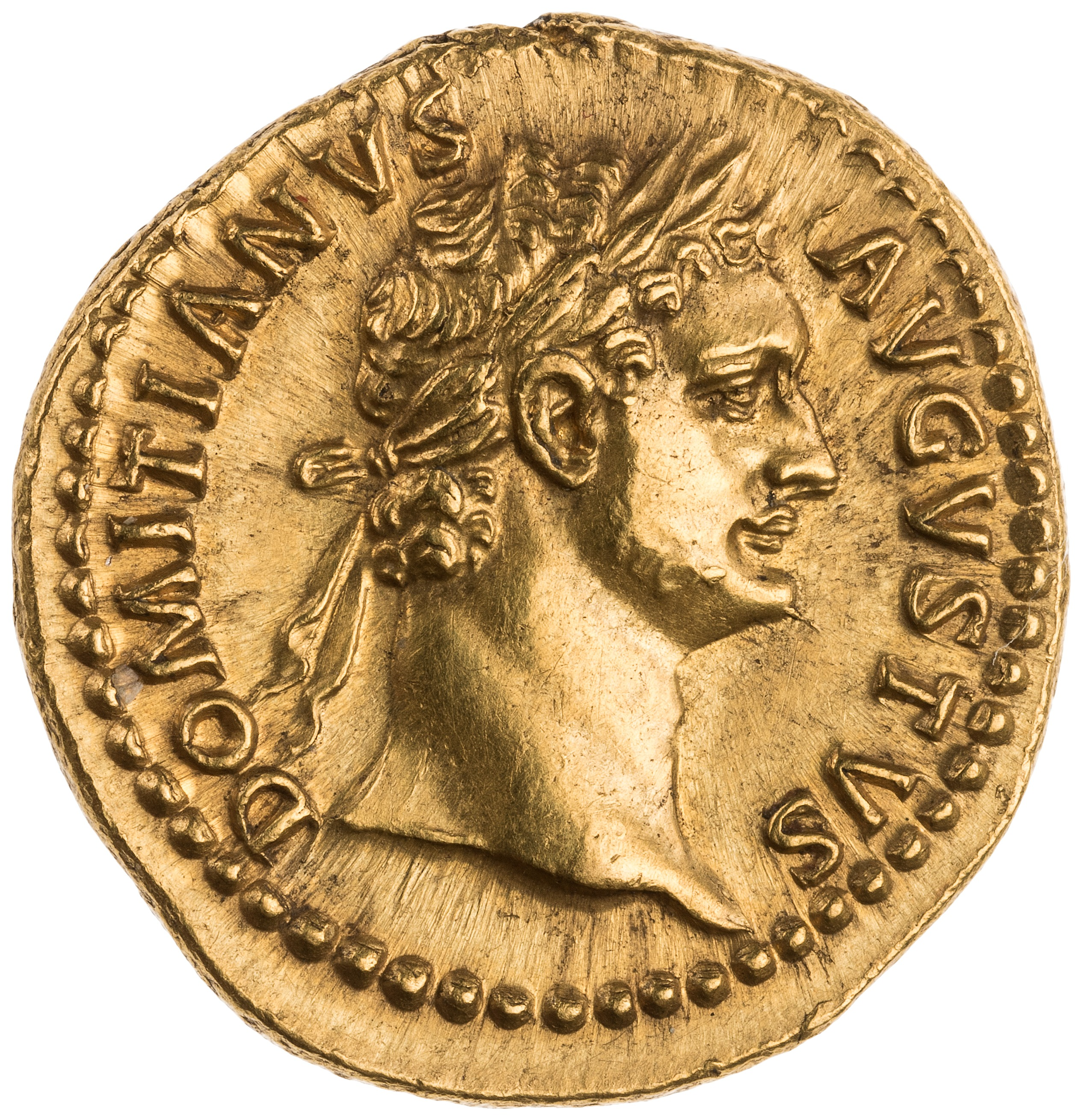
A gold Aureus of Domitian

On 9 June 68, amid growing opposition of the Senate and the army, Nero committed suicide and with him the Julio-Claudian dynasty came to an end. Chaos ensued, leading to a year of brutal civil war known as the Year of the Four Emperors, during which the four most influential generals in the Roman Empire—Galba, Otho, Vitellius and Vespasian—successively vied for imperial power. News of Nero's death reached Vespasian as he was preparing to besiege the city of Jerusalem. Almost simultaneously the Senate had declared Galba, then governor of Hispania Tarraconensis (modern northern Spain), as Emperor of Rome. Rather than continue his campaign, Vespasian decided to await further orders and send Titus to greet the new Emperor. Before reaching Italy, Titus learnt that Galba had been murdered and replaced by Otho, the governor of Lusitania (modern Portugal). At the same time Vitellius and his armies in Germania had risen in revolt and prepared to march on Rome, intent on overthrowing Otho. Not wanting to risk being taken hostage by one side or the other, Titus abandoned the journey to Rome and rejoined his father in Judaea.

Otho and Vitellius realized the potential threat posed by the Flavian faction. With four legions at his disposal, Vespasian commanded a strength of nearly 80,000 soldiers. His position in Judaea further granted him the advantage of being nearest to the vital province of Egypt, which controlled the grain supply to Rome. His brother Titus Flavius Sabinus II, as city prefect, commanded the entire city garrison of Rome. Tensions among the Flavian troops ran high but so long as either Galba or Otho remained in power, Vespasian refused to take action. When Otho was defeated by Vitellius at the First Battle of Bedriacum, the armies in Judaea and Egypt took matters into their own hands and declared Vespasian emperor on 1 July 69. Vespasian accepted and entered an alliance with Gaius Licinius Mucianus, the governor of Syria, against Vitellius. A strong force drawn from the Judaean and Syrian legions marched on Rome under the command of Mucianus, while Vespasian travelled to Alexandria, leaving Titus in charge of ending the Jewish rebellion.

In Rome, Domitian was placed under house arrest by Vitellius, as a safeguard against Flavian aggression. Support for the old emperor waned as more legions around the empire pledged their allegiance to Vespasian. On 24 October 69, the forces of Vitellius and Vespasian (under Marcus Antonius Primus) met at the Second Battle of Bedriacum, which ended in a crushing defeat for the armies of Vitellius. In despair, Vitellius attempted to negotiate a surrender. Terms of peace, including a voluntary abdication, were agreed upon with Titus Flavius Sabinus II but the soldiers of the Praetorian Guard—the imperial bodyguard—considered such a resignation disgraceful and prevented Vitellius from carrying out the treaty. On the morning of 18 December, the emperor appeared to deposit the imperial insignia at the Temple of Concord but at the last minute retraced his steps to the Imperial palace. In the confusion, the leading men of the state gathered at Sabinus' house, proclaiming Vespasian as Emperor, but the multitude dispersed when Vitellian cohorts clashed with the armed escort of Sabinus, who was forced to retreat to the Capitoline Hill.

During the night, he was joined by his relatives, including Domitian. The armies of Mucianus were nearing Rome but the besieged Flavian party did not hold out for longer than a day. On 19 December, Vitellianists burst onto the Capitol and in a skirmish, Sabinus was captured and executed. Domitian managed to escape by disguising himself as a worshipper of Isis and spent the night in safety with one of his father's supporters, Cornelius Primus. By the afternoon of 20 December, Vitellius was dead, his armies having been defeated by the Flavian legions. With nothing more to be feared, Domitian came forward to meet the invading forces; he was universally saluted by the title of Caesar and the mass of troops conducted him to his father's house. The following day, 21 December, the Senate proclaimed Vespasian emperor of the Roman Empire.

=== Aftermath of the war ===
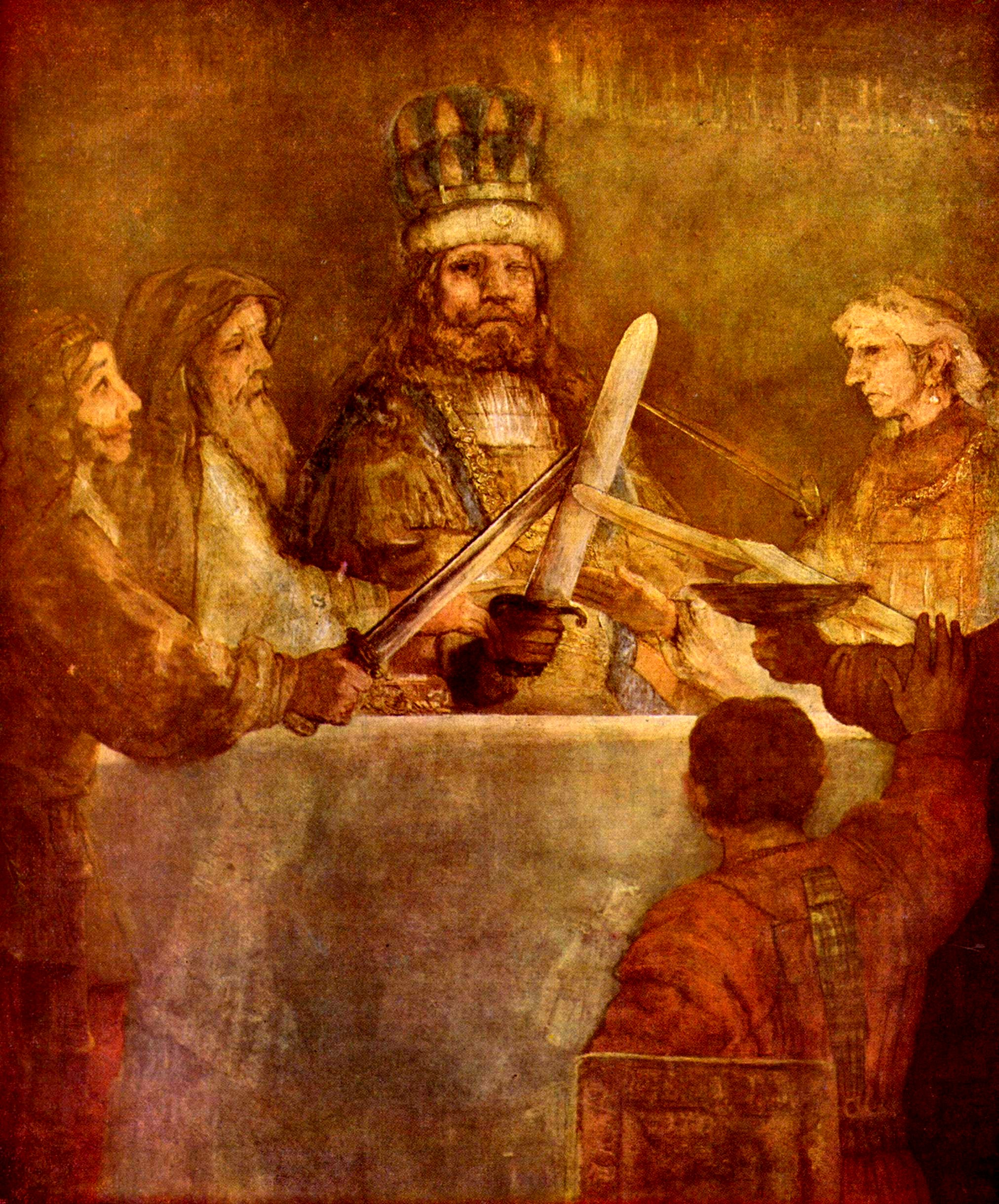
The Conspiracy of Claudius Civilis (detail), by Rembrandt (1661). During the Batavian rebellion, Domitian eagerly sought the opportunity to attain military glory, but was denied command of a legion by superior officers.

Although the war had officially ended, a state of anarchy and lawlessness pervaded in the first days following the demise of Vitellius. Order was properly restored by Mucianus in early 70 but Vespasian did not enter Rome until September of that year. In the meantime, Domitian acted as the representative of the Flavian family in the Roman Senate. He received the title of Caesar and was appointed praetor with consular power. The ancient historian Tacitus describes Domitian's first speech in the Senate as brief and measured, at the same time noting his ability to elude awkward questions. Domitian's authority was merely nominal, foreshadowing what was to be his role for at least ten more years. By all accounts, Mucianus held the real power in Vespasian's absence and he was careful to ensure that Domitian, still only eighteen years old, did not overstep the boundaries of his function.

Strict control was also maintained over the young Caesar's entourage, promoting away Flavian generals such as Arrius Varus and Antonius Primus and replacing them with more reliable men such as Arrecinus Clemens. Equally curtailed by Mucianus were Domitian's military ambitions. The civil war of 69 had severely destabilized the provinces, leading to several local uprisings such as the Batavian revolt in Gaul. Batavian auxiliaries of the Rhine legions, led by Gaius Julius Civilis, had rebelled with the aid of a faction of Treveri under the command of Julius Classicus. Seven legions were sent from Rome, led by Vespasian's brother-in-law Quintus Petillius Cerialis.

Although the revolt was quickly suppressed, exaggerated reports of disaster prompted Mucianus to depart the capital with reinforcements of his own. Domitian eagerly sought the opportunity to attain military glory and joined the other officers with the intention of commanding a legion of his own. According to Tacitus, Mucianus was not keen on this prospect but since he considered Domitian a liability in any capacity that was entrusted to him, he preferred to keep him close at hand rather than in Rome. When news arrived of Cerialis' victory over Civilis, Mucianus tactfully dissuaded Domitian from pursuing further military endeavours. Domitian then wrote to Cerialis personally, suggesting he hand over command of his army but, once again, he was snubbed. With the return of Vespasian in late September, his political role was rendered all but obsolete and Domitian withdrew from government devoting his time to arts and literature.

=== Marriage ===
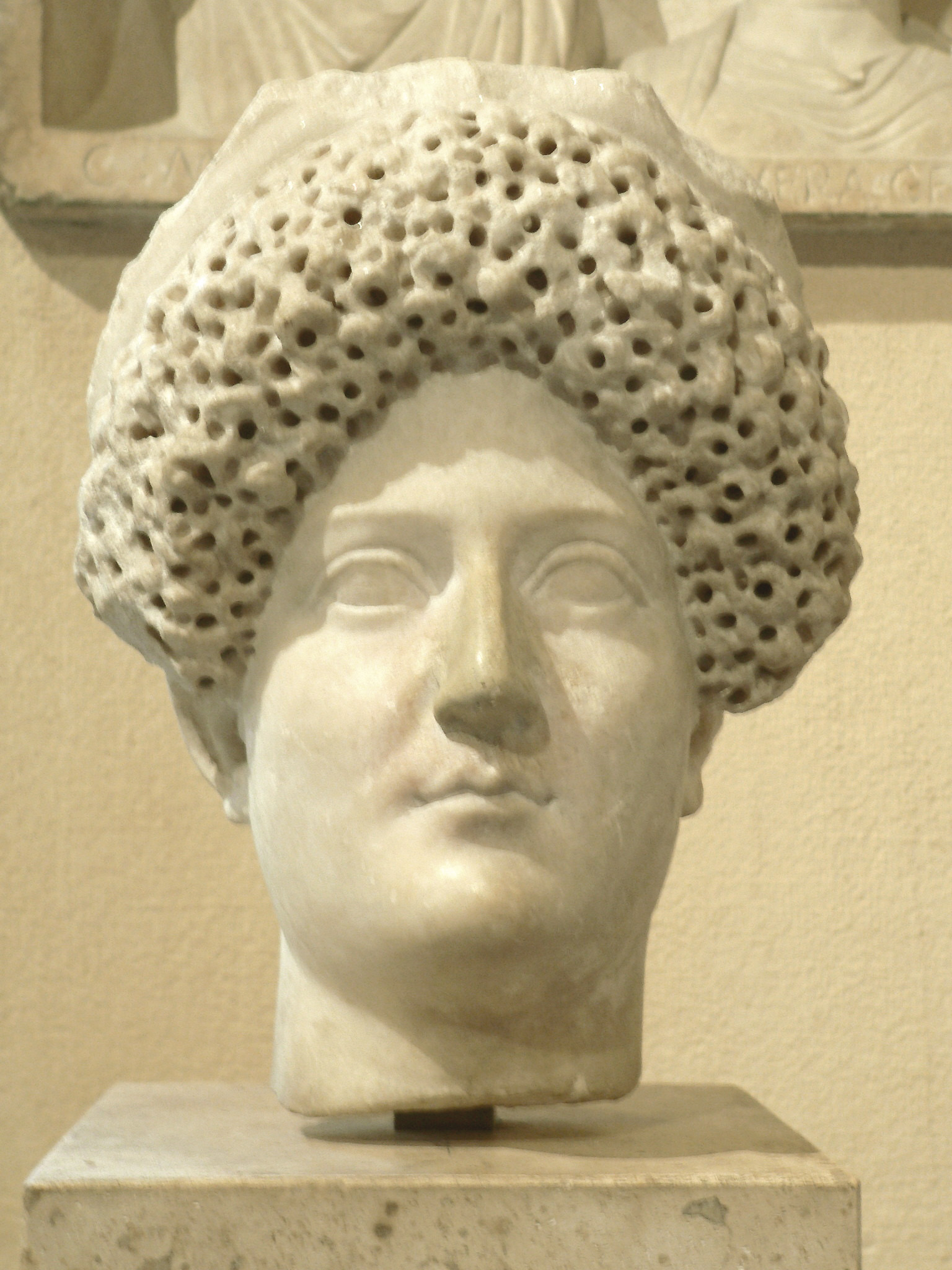
A bust of Domitia Longina (Louvre)

Where his political and military career had ended in disappointment, Domitian's private affairs were more successful. In 70 Vespasian attempted to arrange a dynastic marriage between his youngest son and the daughter of Titus, Julia Flavia, but Domitian was adamant in his love for Domitia Longina, going so far as to persuade her husband, Lucius Aelius Lamia Plautius Aelianus, to divorce her so that Domitian could marry her himself. Despite its initial recklessness, the alliance was very prestigious for both families. Domitia Longina was the younger daughter of Gnaeus Domitius Corbulo, a respected general and honoured politician who had distinguished himself for his leadership in Armenia. Following the failed Pisonian conspiracy against Nero in 65, he had been forced to commit suicide. She was also a granddaughter of Junia Lepida, a descendant of Emperor Augustus. The new marriage not only re-established ties to senatorial opposition, but also served the broader Flavian propaganda of the time, which sought to diminish Vespasian's political success under Nero. Instead, connections to Claudius and Britannicus were emphasised, and Nero's victims, or those otherwise disadvantaged by him, rehabilitated.

In 80, Domitia and Domitian's only attested son was born. It is not known what the boy's name was, but he died in childhood in 83. Shortly following his accession as emperor, Domitian bestowed the honorific title of Augusta upon Domitia, while their son was deified, appearing as such on the reverse of coin types from this period. Nevertheless, the marriage appears to have faced a significant crisis in 83. For reasons unknown, Domitian briefly exiled Domitia, and then soon recalled her, either out of love or due to rumours that he was carrying on a relationship with his niece Julia Flavia. Jones argues that most likely he did so for her failure to produce an heir. By 84, Domitia had returned to the palace, where she lived for the remainder of Domitian's reign without incident. Little is known of Domitia's activities as empress, or how much influence she wielded in Domitian's government, but it seems her role was limited. From Suetonius, we know that she at least accompanied the Emperor to the amphitheatre, while the Jewish writer Josephus speaks of benefits he received from her. It is not known whether Domitian had other children, but he did not marry again. Despite allegations by Roman sources of adultery and divorce, the marriage appears to have been happy.

=== Ceremonial heir (71–81) ===
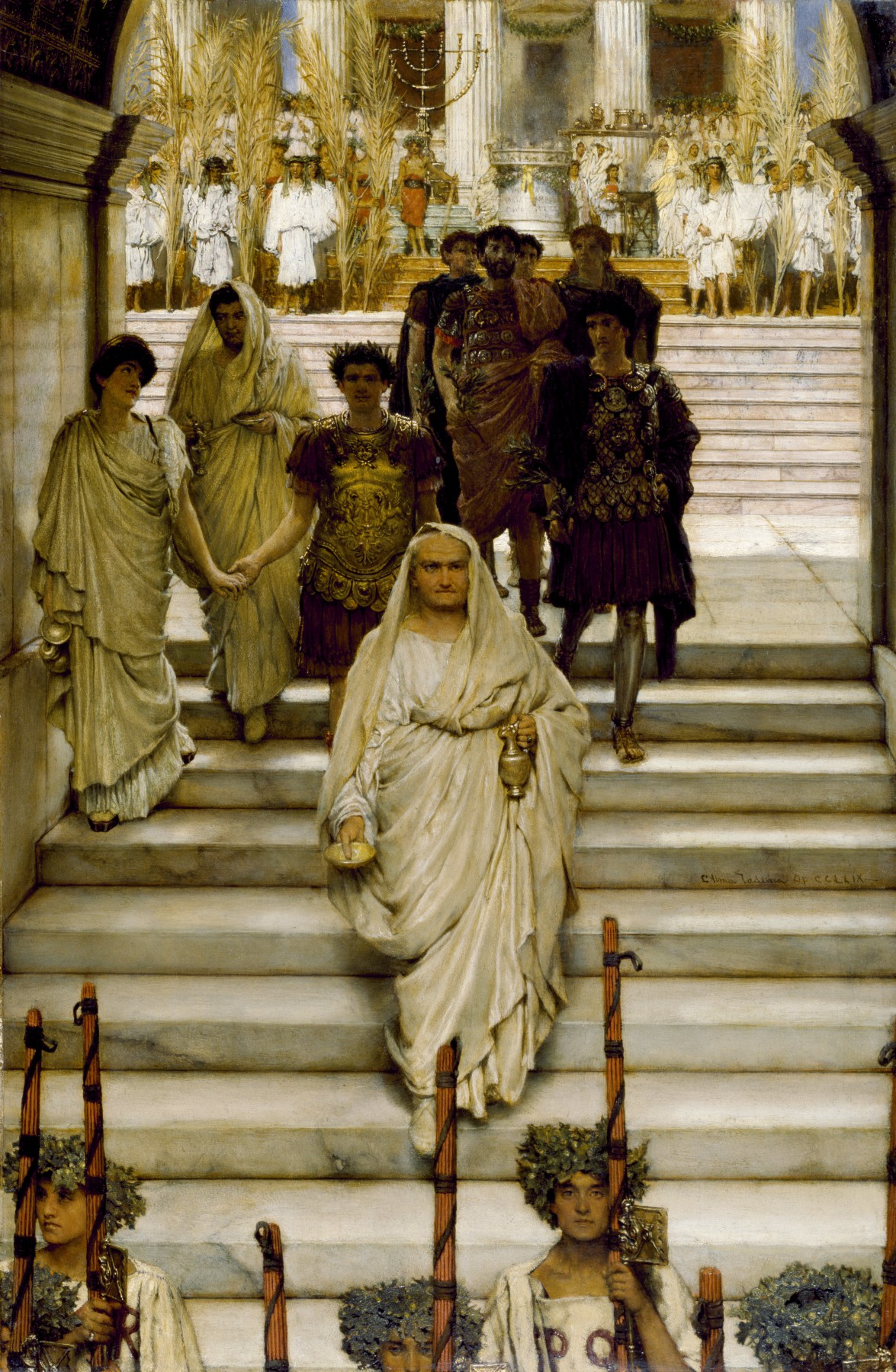
The Triumph of Titus, by Sir Lawrence Alma-Tadema (1885), depicting the Flavian family during the triumphal procession of 71. Vespasian proceeds at the head of the family, dressed as pontifex maximus, followed by Domitian with Domitia Longina, and finally Titus, also dressed in religious regalia. An exchange of glances between Titus and Domitia suggests an affair upon which historians have speculated. Alma-Tadema was known for his meticulous historical research on the ancient world.

Before becoming Emperor, Domitian's role in the Flavian government was largely ceremonial. In June 71, Titus returned triumphant from the war in Judaea. Ultimately, the rebellion had claimed the lives of tens of thousands, perhaps hundreds of thousands, a majority of whom were Jewish. The city and temple of Jerusalem were completely destroyed, its most valuable treasures carried off by the Roman army, and nearly 100,000 people were captured and enslaved. For his victory, the Senate awarded Titus a Roman triumph. On the day of the festivities, the Flavian family rode into the capital, preceded by a lavish parade that displayed the spoils of the war. The family procession was headed by Vespasian and Titus, while Domitian, riding a magnificent white horse, followed with the remaining Flavian relatives.

Leaders of the Jewish resistance were executed in the Forum Romanum, after which the procession closed with religious sacrifices at the Temple of Jupiter. A triumphal arch, the Arch of Titus, was eventually erected at the south-east entrance to the Forum to commemorate the successful end of the war. Yet the return of Titus further highlighted the comparative insignificance of Domitian, both militarily and politically. As the eldest and most experienced of Vespasian's sons, Titus shared tribunician power with his father, received seven consulships, the censorship, and was given command of the Praetorian Guard; powers that left no doubt he was the designated heir to the Empire. As a second son, Domitian held honorary titles, such as Caesar and princeps iuventutis, and several priesthoods, including those of augur, pontifex, frater arvalis, magister frater arvalium, and sacerdos collegiorum omnium, but no office with imperium. He held six consulships during Vespasian's reign but only one of these, in 73, was an ordinary consulship. The other five were less prestigious suffect consulships, which he held in 71, 75, 76, 77 and 79 respectively, usually replacing his father or brother in mid-January.

While ceremonial, these offices no doubt gained Domitian valuable experience in the Roman Senate, and may have contributed to his later reservations about its relevance. Under Vespasian and Titus, non-Flavians were virtually excluded from the important public offices. Mucianus himself all but disappeared from historical records during this time, and it is believed he died sometime between 75 and 77. Real power was unmistakably concentrated in the hands of the Flavian faction; the weakened Senate only maintained the facade of democracy. Because Titus effectively acted as co-emperor with his father, no abrupt change in Flavian policy occurred when Vespasian died on 24 June 79. Titus assured Domitian that full partnership in the government would soon be his, but neither tribunician power nor imperium of any kind was conferred upon him during Titus' brief reign.

Two major disasters struck during 79 and 80. In October/November 79, Mount Vesuvius erupted, burying the surrounding cities of Pompeii and Herculaneum under metres of ash and lava; the following year, a fire broke out in Rome that lasted three days and destroyed a number of important public buildings. Consequently, Titus spent much of his reign coordinating relief efforts and restoring damaged property. On 13 September 81, after barely two years in office, he unexpectedly died of fever during a trip to the Sabine territories. Ancient authors have implicated Domitian in the death of his brother, either by directly accusing him of murder, or implying he left the ailing Titus for dead, even alleging that during his lifetime, Domitian was openly plotting against his brother. It is difficult to assess the factual veracity of these statements given the known bias of the surviving sources. Brotherly affection was likely at a minimum, but this was hardly surprising, considering that Domitian had barely seen Titus after the age of seven. Whatever the nature of their relationship, Domitian seems to have displayed little sympathy when his brother lay dying, instead making for the Praetorian camp where he was proclaimed emperor. The following day, 14 September, the Senate confirmed Domitian's powers, granting tribunician power, the office of pontifex maximus, and the titles of Augustus ("venerable"), and Pater Patriae ("father of the country").

== Emperor (81–96) ==
=== Rule ===
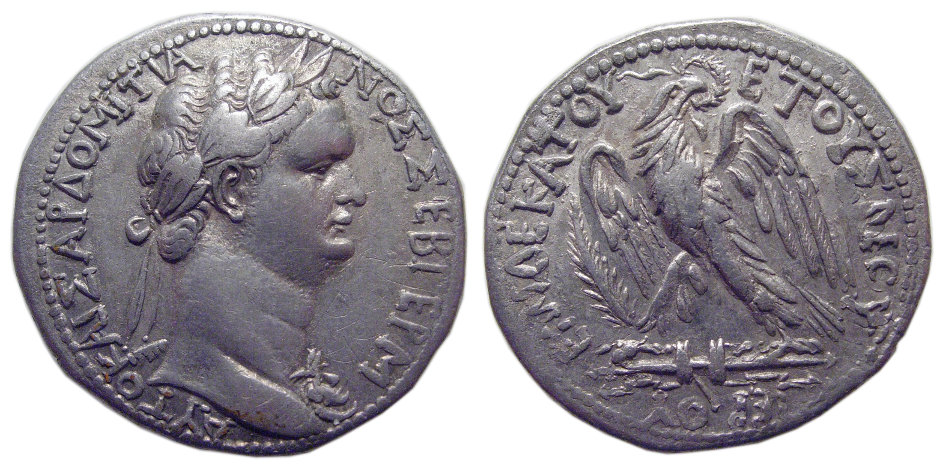
A silver tetradrachm of Domitian from the Antioch Mint in Syria, c. 91–92 AD (Note: Obverse: Laureate bust of Emperor Domitian facing right, Classical Medusa at the nick of Domitians neck. Legend reads: AYTO. KAIΣAP ΔOMITIANOΣ ΣEB. ΓEPM. (imp. caesar Domitianus Avg. Germ.) Reverse: Eagle standing on a thunderbolt, palm before, wings open, head facing right, holding wreath in its beak. Legend reads: ETOYΣ NEOY ΙEPOY ENΔEKATOY (new sacred year eleventh) Size: 27mm, 14.8g Reference: Prieur p. 22, no. 147S)

As emperor, Domitian quickly dispensed with the republican facade his father and brother had maintained during their reign. By moving the centre of government to the imperial court, Domitian openly rendered the Senate's powers obsolete. According to Pliny the Younger, Domitian believed that the Roman Empire was to be governed as a divine monarchy with himself as the benevolent despot at its head. In addition to exercising absolute political power, Domitian believed the emperor's role encompassed every aspect of daily life, guiding the Roman people as a cultural and moral authority. To usher in the new era, he embarked on ambitious economic, military, and cultural programs with the intention of restoring the Empire to the splendour it had seen under the Emperor Augustus.

Despite these grand designs, Domitian was determined to govern the Empire conscientiously and scrupulously. He became personally involved in all branches of the administration: edicts were issued governing the smallest details of everyday life and law, while taxation and public morals were rigidly enforced. According to Suetonius, the imperial bureaucracy never ran more efficiently than under Domitian, whose exacting standards and suspicious nature maintained historically low corruption among provincial governors and elected officials. Although he made no pretence regarding the significance of the Senate under his absolute rule, those senators he deemed unworthy were expelled from the Senate, and in the distribution of public offices he rarely favoured family members, a policy that stood in contrast to the nepotism practiced by Vespasian and Titus.

Above all, however, Domitian valued loyalty and malleability in those he assigned to strategic posts, qualities he found more often in men of the equestrian order than in members of the Senate or his own family, whom he regarded with suspicion, and promptly removed from office if they disagreed with imperial policy. The reality of Domitian's autocracy was further highlighted by the fact that, more than any emperor since Tiberius, he spent significant periods of time away from the capital. Although the Senate's power had been in decline since the fall of the Republic, under Domitian the seat of power was no longer even in Rome, but rather wherever the Emperor was. Until the completion of the Flavian Palace on the Palatine Hill, the imperial court was situated at Alba or Circeii, and sometimes even farther afield. Domitian toured the European provinces extensively, and spent at least three years of his reign in Germania and Illyricum, conducting military campaigns on the frontiers of the Empire.

=== Building program ===
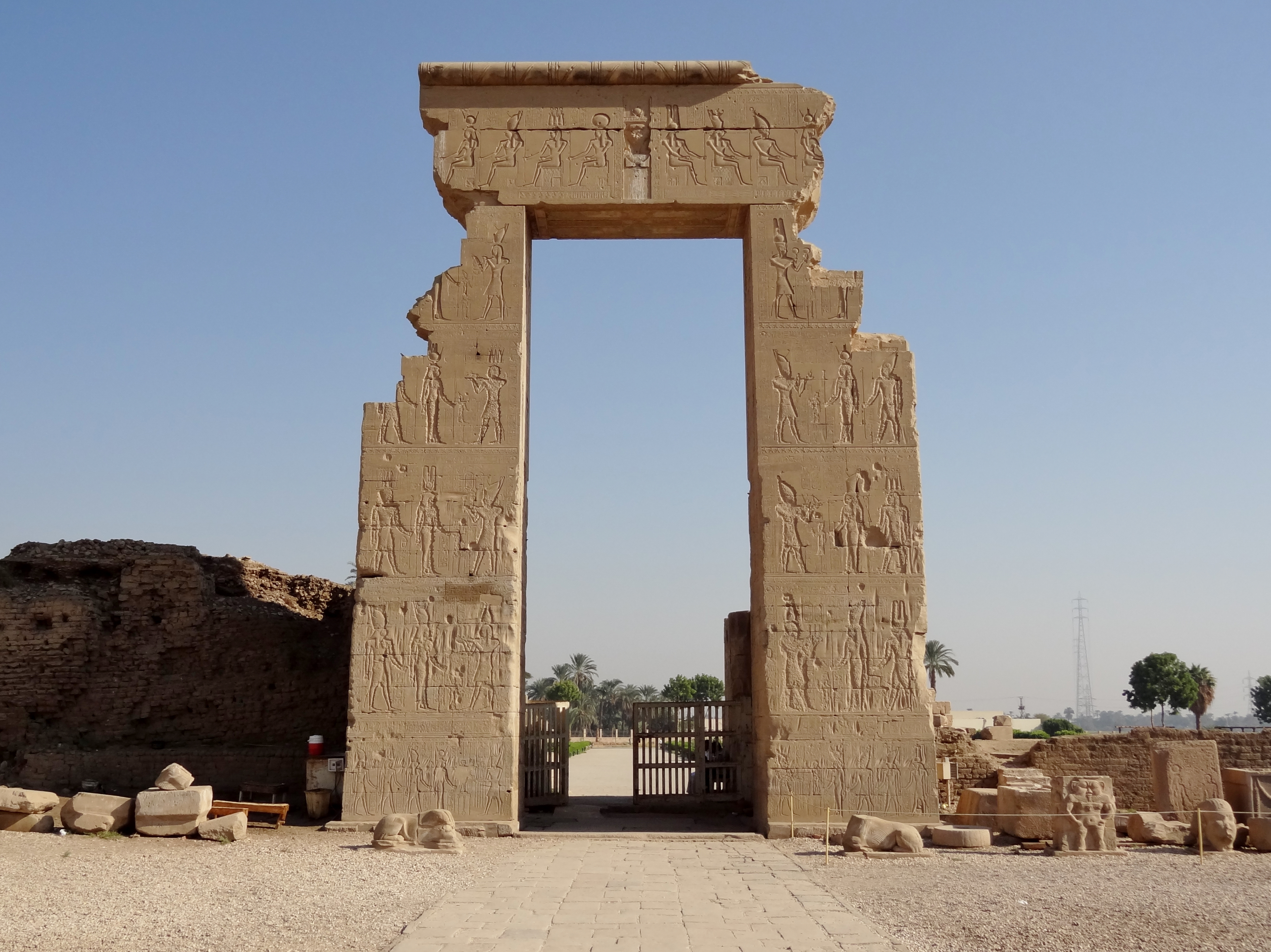
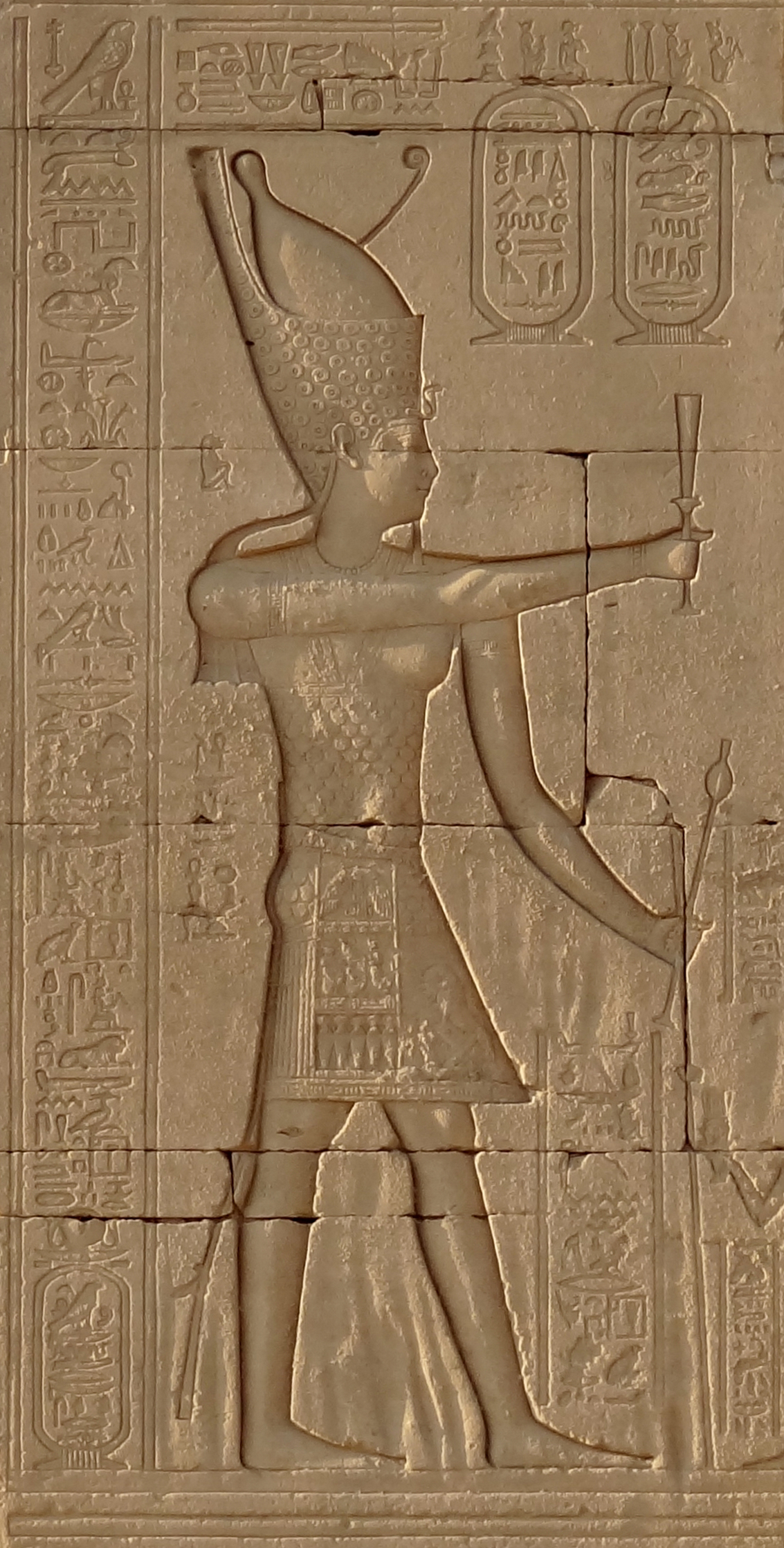
"Gate of Domitian and Trajan" at the northern entrance of the Temple of Hathor, and Domitian as Pharaoh on the same gate, in Dendera, Egypt

At the time of Domitian's accession the city was still suffering from the damage caused by the civil war of 69 and the fire in 80. Much more than a renovation project, Domitian's building program was intended to be the crowning achievement of an Empire-wide cultural renaissance. Around fifty structures were erected, restored or completed, achievements second only to those of Augustus. Among the most important new structures were the Stadium of Domitian (today occupied by the Piazza Navona) and the neighbouring Odeon of Domitian, Rome's first permanent venues for Greek-style athletics and artistic competitions which he reintroduced with the Capitoline Games.

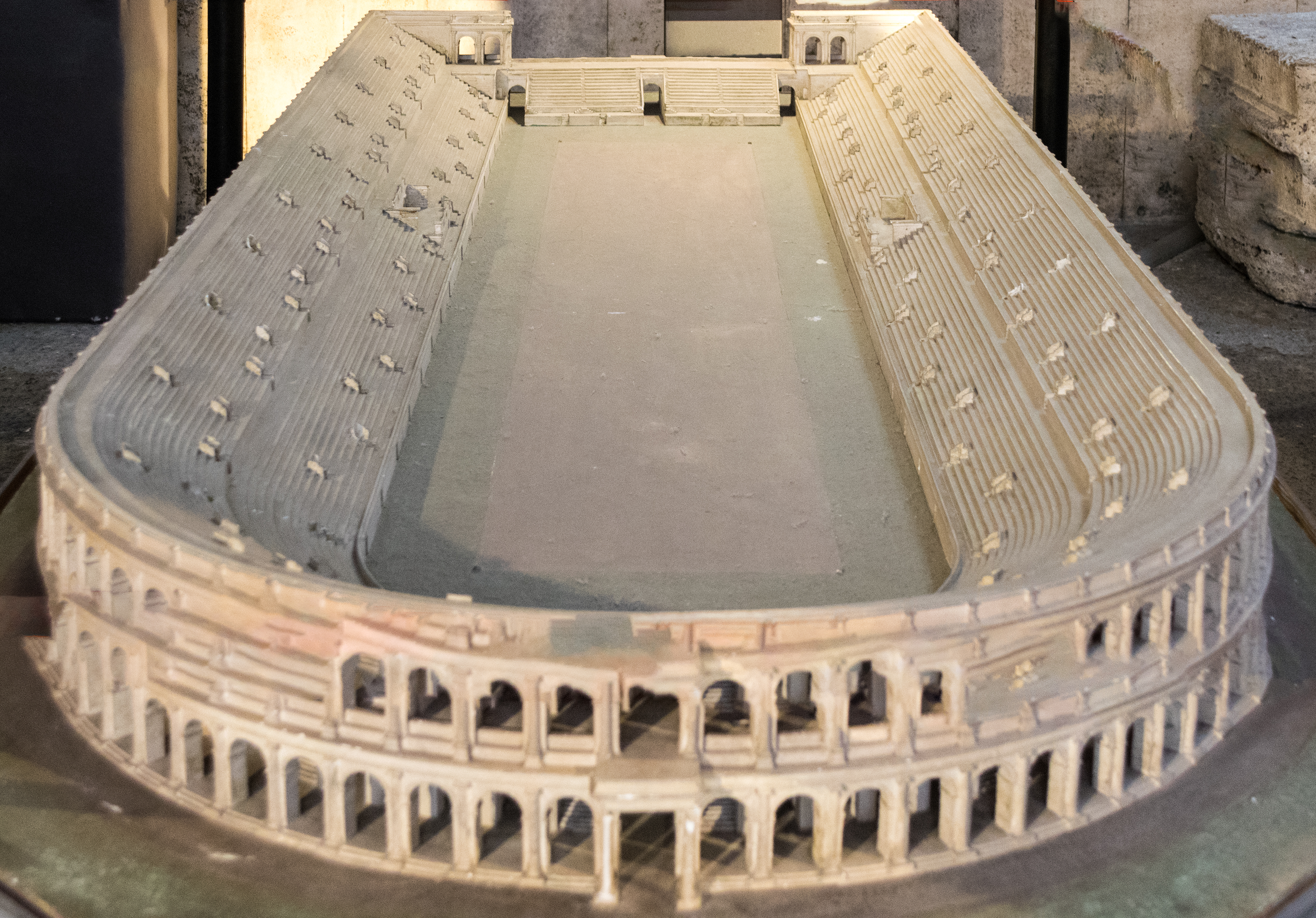
Scale model (1:100) of the Stadium of Domitian (north side)

The most important building Domitian restored was the Temple of Jupiter Optimus Maximus on the Capitoline Hill, said to have been covered with a gilded roof:

"Even the gilding alone of this temple's roof, costing more than 12,000 talents, is beyond the means of the richest private citizen in Rome today."

His expansive and sumptuous palace on the Palatine Hill known as the Flavian Palace was designed by Domitian's master architect Rabirius.

Among buildings he completed were the Temple of Vespasian and Titus, the Arch of Titus and the Colosseum, to which he added a fourth level and finished the interior seating area.

In Egypt too, Domitian was active in constructing buildings and decorating them. He appears, together with Trajan, in offering scenes on the propylon of the Temple of Hathor at Dendera. His cartouche also appears in the column shafts of the Temple of Khnum at Esna.

==== Palaces and villas ====
For his personal use, he was active in constructing many monumental buildings, including the Villa of Domitian, a vast and sumptuous palace situated 20 km outside Rome in the Alban Hills. In Rome itself, he built the sumptuous Palace of Domitian on the Palatine Hill.

"...if anyone who is amazed at the costliness of the Capitol had seen a single colonnade in the palace of Domitian.....he would have been moved to say to Domitian: Tis not pious, nor nobly ambitious that thou art; thou art diseased; thy mania is to build; like the famous Midas, thou desirest that every thing become gold and stone at thy touch."

Seven other villa-palaces are linked with Domitian at Tusculum, Antium, Sabaudia, Vicarello, Caieta, Terracina and Baiae. Only those at Sabaudia and Vicarello have been positively identified.

=== Economy ===
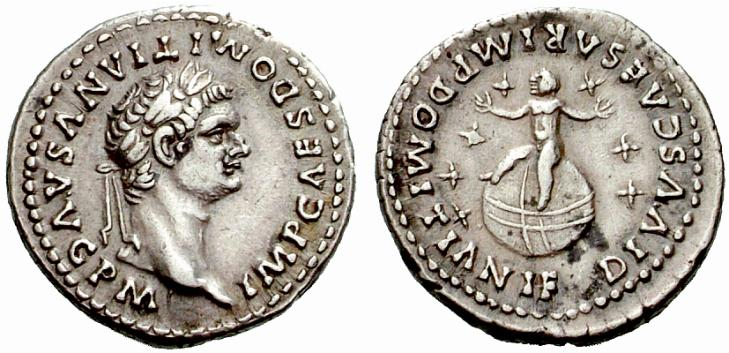
Upon his accession, Domitian revalued the Roman currency by increasing the silver content of the denarius by 8.88%. This coin commemorates the deification of Domitian's son. (Note: Caption: IMP. CAES. DOMITIANVS AVG. P. M. / DIVUS CAESAR IMP. DOMITIANI F.)

Domitian's tendency towards micromanagement was nowhere more evident than in his financial policy. The question of whether Domitian left the Roman Empire in debt or with a surplus at the time of his death has been fiercely debated. The evidence points to a balanced economy for the greater part of Domitian's reign. Upon his accession he revalued the Roman currency dramatically. He increased the silver purity of the denarius from 90% to 98% – the actual silver weight increasing from 2.87 grams to 3.26 grams. A financial crisis in 85 forced a devaluation of the silver purity and weight to 93.5% and 3.04 grams respectively. Nevertheless, the new values were still higher than the levels that Vespasian and Titus had maintained during their reigns. Domitian's rigorous taxation policy ensured that this standard was sustained for the following eleven years. Coinage from this era displays a highly consistent degree of quality including meticulous attention to Domitian's titulature and refined artwork on the reverse portraits.

Jones estimates Domitian's annual income at more than 1.2 billion sestertii, of which over one-third would presumably have been spent maintaining the Roman army.

In order to appease the people of Rome an estimated 135 million sestertii was spent on donatives, or congiaria, throughout Domitian's reign. The Emperor also revived the practice of public banquets, which had been reduced to a simple distribution of food under Nero, while he invested large sums on entertainment and games. In 86 he founded the Capitoline Games in his stadium, a quadrennial contest comprising athletic displays, chariot racing, and competitions for oratory, music and acting.

=== Military campaigns ===
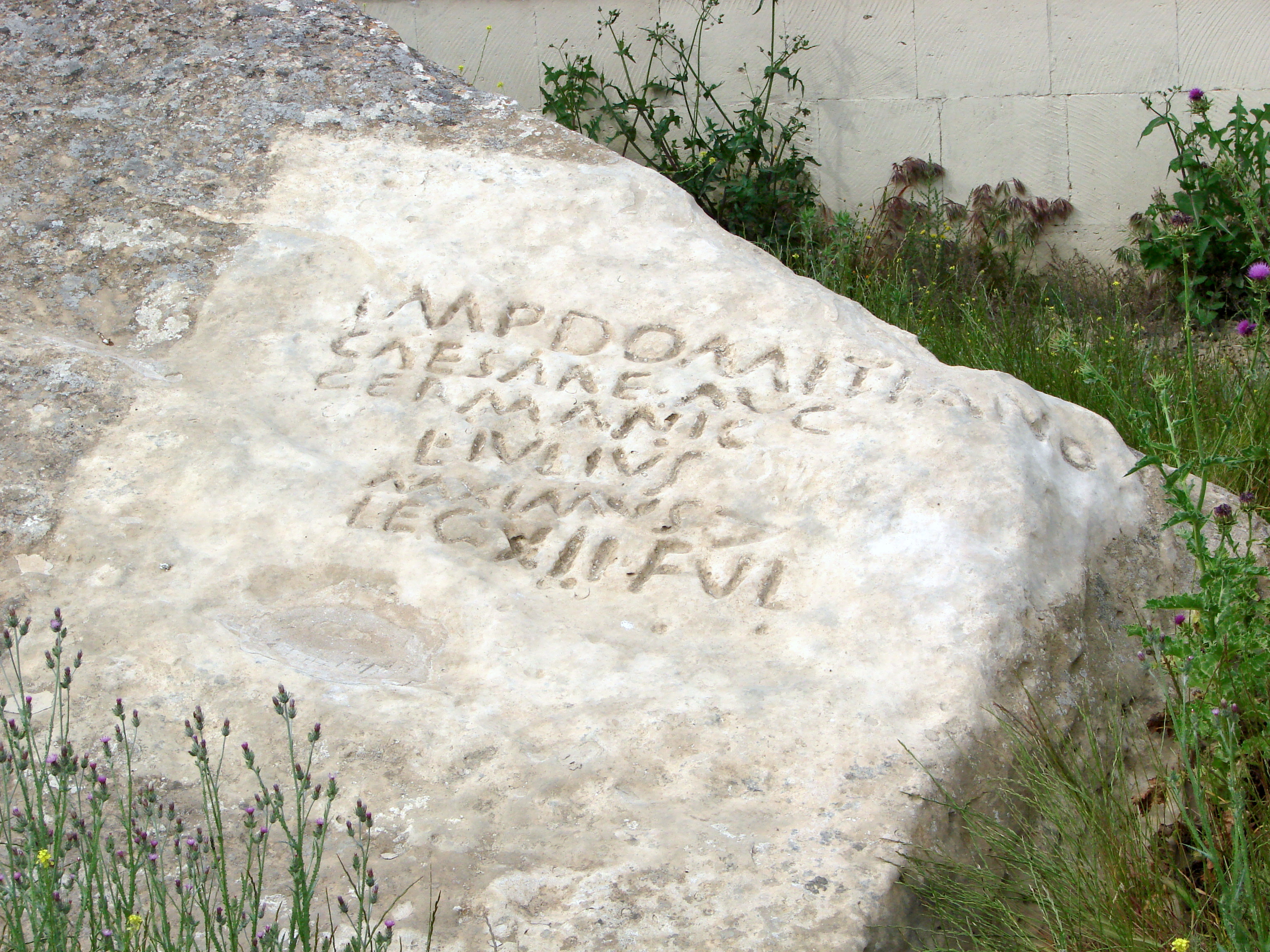
A rock inscription at Gobustan, Azerbaijan (then Caucasian Albania), mentioning Domitian and Legio XII Fulminata; the easternmost-known Roman inscription

The military campaigns undertaken during Domitian's reign were generally defensive in nature, as the Emperor rejected the idea of expansionist warfare. His most significant military contribution was the development of the Limes Germanicus, which encompassed a vast network of roads, forts and watchtowers constructed along the Rhine river to defend the Empire. Nevertheless, several important wars were fought in Gaul, against the Chatti, and across the Danube frontier against the Suebi, the Sarmatians, and the Dacians.

The conquest of Britain continued under the command of Gnaeus Julius Agricola, who expanded the Roman Empire as far as Caledonia, or modern day Scotland. Domitian also founded a new legion in 82, the Legio I Minervia, to fight against the Chatti. Domitian is also credited on the easternmost evidence of Roman military presence, the rock inscription near Boyukdash mountain, in present-day Azerbaijan. As judged by the carved titles of Caesar, Augustus and Germanicus, the related march took place between 84 and 96 AD.

Domitian's administration of the Roman army was characterized by the same fastidious involvement he exhibited in other branches of the government. His competence as a military strategist was criticized by his contemporaries however. Although he claimed several triumphs, these were largely propaganda manoeuvres. Tacitus derided Domitian's victory against the Chatti as a "mock triumph", and criticized his decision to retreat in Britain following the conquests of Agricola. Nevertheless, Domitian appears to have been very popular among the soldiers, spending an estimated three years of his reign among the army on campaigns—more than any emperor since Augustus—and raising their pay by one-third. While the army command may have disapproved of his tactical and strategic decisions, the loyalty of the common soldier was unquestioned.

==== Campaign against the Chatti ====
Once Emperor, Domitian immediately sought to attain his long delayed military glory. As early as 82, or possibly 83, he went to Gaul, ostensibly to conduct a census, and suddenly ordered an attack on the Chatti. For this purpose, a new legion was founded, Legio I Minervia, which constructed some 75 kilometres (46 mi) of roads through Chattan territory to uncover the enemy's hiding places. Although little information survives of the battles fought, enough early victories were apparently achieved for Domitian to be back in Rome by the end of 83, where he celebrated an elaborate triumph and conferred upon himself the title of Germanicus. Domitian's supposed victory was much scorned by ancient authors, who described the campaign as "uncalled for", and a "mock triumph". The evidence lends some credence to these claims, as the Chatti would later play a significant role during the revolt of Saturninus in 89.

==== Conquest of northern Britain (77–84) ====
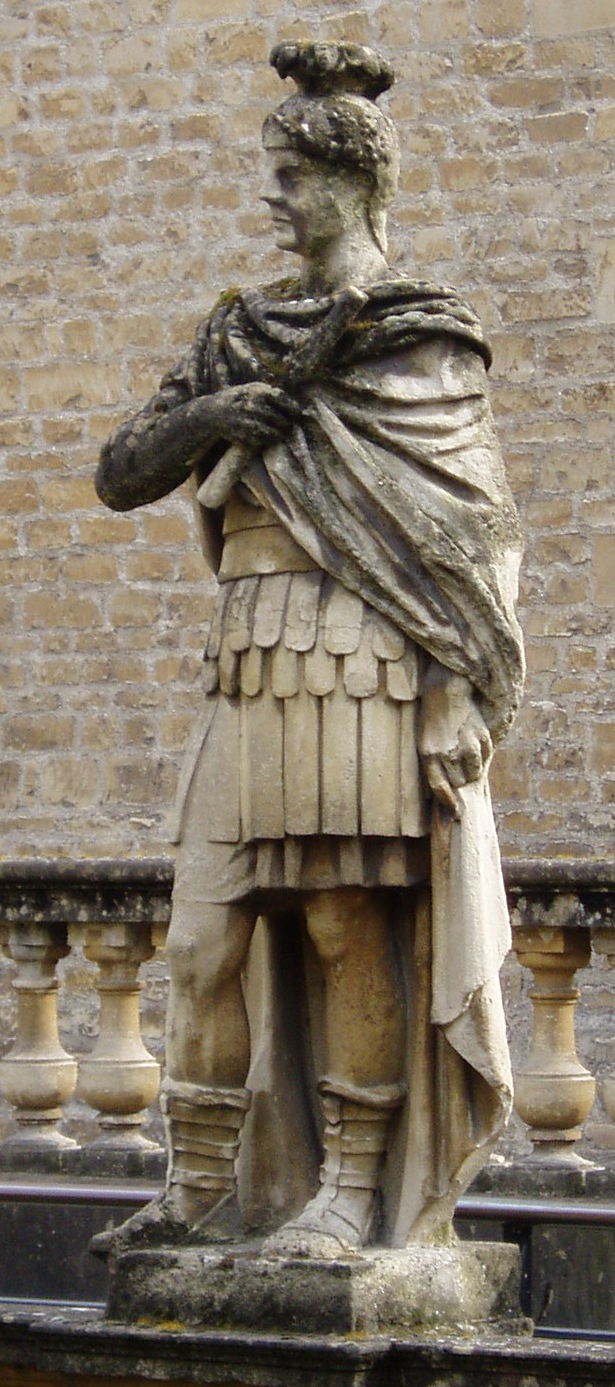
Gnaeus Julius Agricola (Bath)

One of the most detailed reports of military activity under the Flavian dynasty was written by Tacitus, whose biography of his father-in-law Gnaeus Julius Agricola largely concerns the conquest of northern Britain between 77 and 84. Agricola arrived c. 77 as governor of Roman Britain, immediately launching campaigns into Caledonia (modern Scotland). In 82, Agricola crossed an unidentified body of water and defeated peoples unknown to the Romans until then. Tacitus recalls that his father-in-law often claimed the island could be conquered with a single legion and a few auxiliaries. He had given refuge to an exiled Irish king whom he hoped he might use as the excuse for conquest. This conquest never happened, but some historians believe that the crossing referred to was in fact a small-scale exploratory or punitive expedition to Ireland.

Turning his attention from Ireland, the following year Agricola raised a fleet and pushed beyond the River Forth into Caledonia. To aid the advance, a large legionary fortress was constructed at Inchtuthil. In the summer of 84, Agricola faced the armies of the Caledonians, led by Calgacus, at the Battle of Mons Graupius. Although the Romans inflicted heavy losses on the enemy, two-thirds of the Caledonian army escaped and hid in the Scottish marshes and Highlands, ultimately preventing Agricola from bringing the entire British island under his control. In 85, Agricola was recalled to Rome by Domitian, having served for more than six years as governor, longer than normal for consular legates during the Flavian era.

Tacitus claims that Domitian ordered his recall because Agricola's successes outshone the Emperor's own modest victories in Germania. The relationship between commander and Emperor is unclear: Agricola was awarded triumphal decorations and a statue, but never again held a civil or military post in spite of his experience and renown. He was offered the governorship of the province of Africa but declined it, either due to ill health or, as Tacitus claims, the machinations of Domitian. Not long after Agricola's recall from Britain, the Roman Empire entered into war with the Kingdom of Dacia in the East. Reinforcements were needed, and in 87 or 88, Domitian ordered a large-scale strategic withdrawal of troops in the British province. The fortress at Inchtuthil was dismantled and the Caledonian forts and watchtowers abandoned, moving the Roman frontier some 120 kilometres (75 mi) further south. The army command may have resented Domitian's decision to retreat, but to him the Caledonian territories never represented anything more than a loss to the Roman treasury.

==== Dacian wars (85–88) ====
The most significant threat the Roman Empire faced during the reign of Domitian arose from the northern provinces of Illyricum, where the Suebi, the Sarmatians and the Dacians continuously harassed Roman settlements along the Danube river. Of these, the Sarmatians and the Dacians posed the most formidable threat. In approximately 84 or 85 the Dacians, led by King Decebalus, crossed the Danube into the province of Moesia, wreaking havoc and killing the Moesian governor Oppius Sabinus. Domitian quickly launched a counteroffensive, personally travelling to the region accompanied by a large force commanded by his praetorian prefect Cornelius Fuscus. Fuscus successfully drove the Dacians back across the border in mid-85, prompting Domitian to return to Rome and celebrate his second triumph.

The victory proved short-lived, however: as early in 86 Fuscus embarked on an ill-fated expedition into Dacia. Fuscus was killed, and the battle standard of the Praetorian Guard was lost. The loss of the battle standard, or aquila, was indicative of a crushing defeat and a serious affront to Roman national pride. Domitian returned to Moesia in August 86. He divided the province into Lower Moesia and Upper Moesia, and transferred three additional legions to the Danube. In 87, the Romans invaded Dacia once more, this time under the command of Tettius Julianus, and finally defeated Decebalus in late 88 at the same site where Fuscus had previously perished. An attack on the Dacian capital Sarmizegetusa was forestalled when new troubles arose on the Germanic frontier in 89.

In order to avert having to conduct a war on two fronts, Domitian agreed to terms of peace with Decebalus, negotiating free access of Roman troops through the Dacian region while granting Decebalus an annual subsidy of 8 million sesterces. Contemporary authors severely criticized this treaty, which was considered shameful to the Romans and left the deaths of Sabinus and Fuscus unavenged. For the remainder of Domitian's reign Dacia remained a relatively peaceful client kingdom, but Decebalus used the Roman money to fortify his defenses. Domitian probably wanted a new war against the Dacians, and reinforced Upper Moesia with two more cavalry units brought from Syria and with at least five cohorts brought from Pannonia. Trajan continued Domitian's policy and added two more units to the auxiliary forces of Upper Moesia, and then he used the build up of troops for his Dacian wars. Eventually the Romans achieved a decisive victory against Decebalus in 106. Again, the Roman army sustained heavy losses, but Trajan succeeded in capturing Sarmizegetusa and, importantly, annexed the Dacian gold and silver mines.

=== Religious policy ===
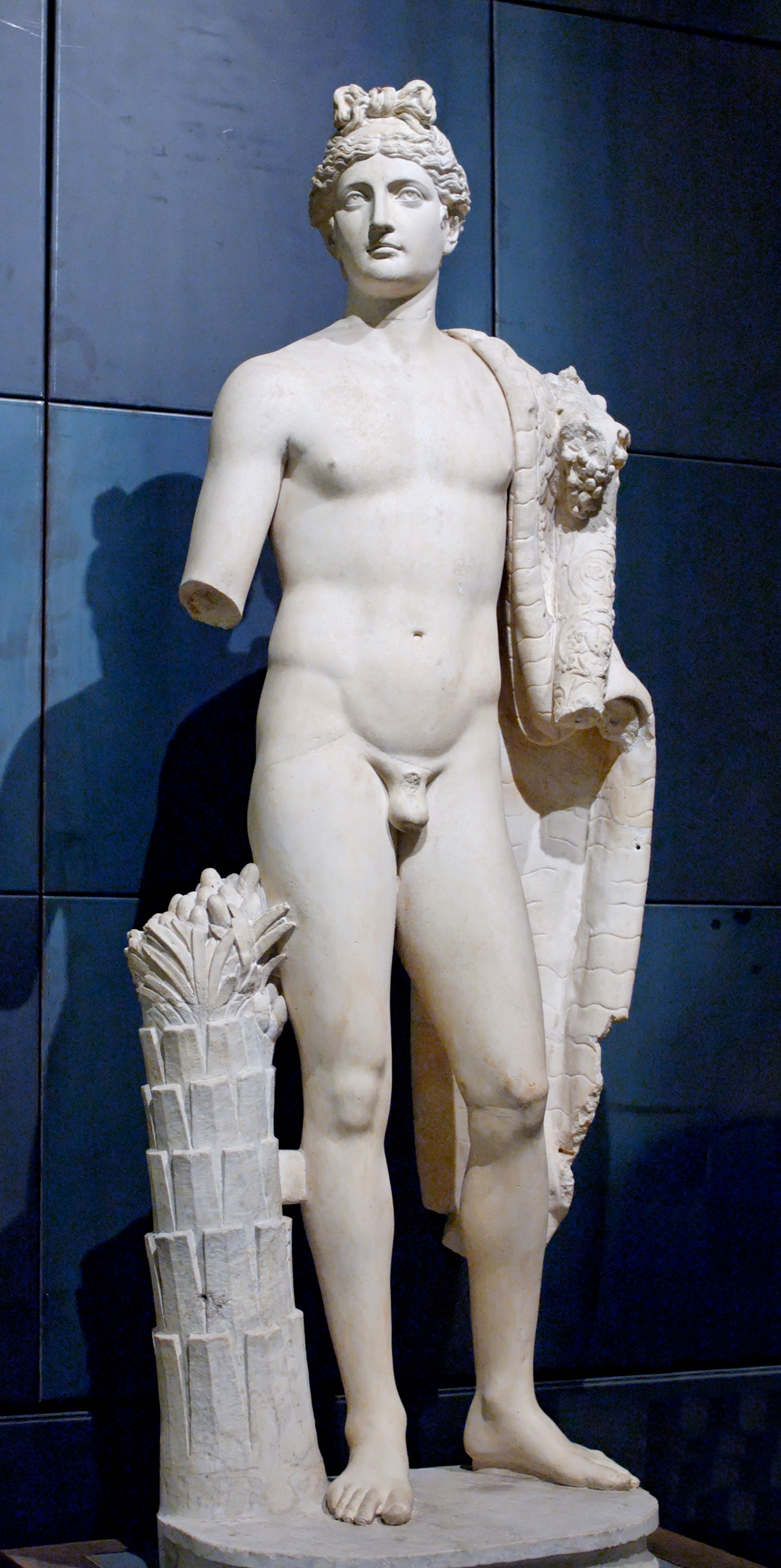
The genius of Domitian with the aegis and a cornucopia, marble statue, Capitoline Museums, Rome

Domitian followed the traditional Roman religion and personally enforced ancient customs and morals throughout his reign. To provide a divine justification for the Flavian rule, Domitian emphasized the family's connections with the chief deity Jupiter, including through his restoration of the Temple of Jupiter Optimus Maximus on the Capitoline Hill. A small chapel dedicated to Jupiter Conservator was also constructed near the house where Domitian had fled to safety on 20 December 69. Later in his reign, Domitian replaced it with a more expansive building, the Temple of Jupiter Custos. However the deity Domitian worshipped most zealously was the goddess Minerva; he kept a personal shrine dedicated to her in his bedroom. Minerva appeared on his coinage, with at least four different reverses featuring her. He also named the legion he founded, Legio I Minervia, after that goddess.

Domitian also revived the practice of the imperial cult, which had fallen somewhat out of use under Vespasian. Significantly, his first act as emperor was the deification of his brother Titus. Upon their deaths, his infant son, and niece, Julia Flavia, were likewise enrolled among the gods. With regards to the emperor himself as a religious figure, both Suetonius and Cassius Dio allege that Domitian officially gave himself the title of Dominus et Deus ("Lord and God"). However, not only did he reject the title of Dominus during his reign, but since he issued no official documentation or coinage to this effect, historians such as Brian Jones contend that such phrases were addressed to Domitian by flatterers who wished to earn favors from him. To foster the worship of the imperial family, he erected a dynastic mausoleum on the site of Vespasian's former house on the Quirinal, and completed the Temple of Vespasian and Titus, a shrine dedicated to the worship of his deified father and brother. To memorialize the military triumphs of the Flavian family, he ordered the construction of the Templum Divorum and the Templum Fortuna Redux, and completed the Arch of Titus.

Construction projects such as these constituted only the most visible part of Domitian's religious policy, which also concerned itself with the fulfilment of religious law and public morals. In 85, he nominated himself perpetual censor, the office that held the task of supervising Roman morals and conduct. Once again, Domitian acquitted himself of this task dutifully, and with care. He renewed the Lex Iulia de Adulteriis Coercendis, under which adultery was punishable by exile. From the list of jurors he struck an equestrian who had divorced his wife and taken her back, while an ex-quaestor was expelled from the Senate for acting and dancing. As eunuchs were popularly used as servants, Domitian punished people who castrated others and wanted to ban the eunuchs themselves. Subsequent emperors made similar prohibitions, but Domitian may have been the first to do so. Despite his moralizing, Domitian had his own favorite eunuch boy, Earinus, who was commemorated by the contemporary court poets Martial and Statius.

Domitian also heavily prosecuted corruption among public officials, removing jurors if they accepted bribes and rescinding legislation when a conflict of interest was suspected. He ensured that libellous writings, especially those directed against himself, were punishable by exile or death. Actors were likewise regarded with suspicion. Consequently, he forbade mimes from appearing on stage in public. Philosophers did not fare much better. Epictetus, who had set himself up in Rome as a professor of philosophy, remarked that philosophers were able to "look tyrants steadily in the face", and it was Domitian's decree of 94, expelling all philosophers from Rome, that caused Epictetus to shift his base to the recently founded Roman city of Nicopolis, in Epirus, Greece, where he lived simply, worked safely and died of old age. In 87, Vestal Virgins were found to have broken their sacred vows of lifelong public chastity. As the Vestals were regarded as daughters of the community, this offense essentially constituted incest. Accordingly, those found guilty of any such transgression were condemned to death, either by a manner of their choosing, or according to the ancient fashion, which dictated that Vestals should be buried alive.

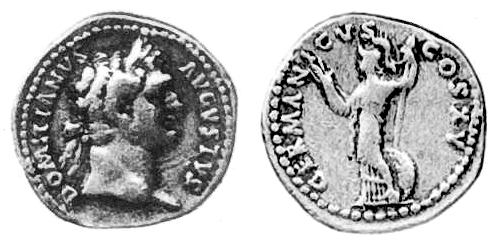
Coin of Domitian, found in the Buddhist stupa of Ahin Posh, dedicated under the Kushan Empire in 150–160, in modern Afghanistan

Foreign religions were tolerated insofar as they did not interfere with public order, or could be assimilated with the traditional Roman religion. The worship of Egyptian deities in particular flourished under the Flavian dynasty, to an extent not seen again until the reign of Commodus. Veneration of Serapis and Isis, who were identified with Jupiter and Minerva respectively, was especially prominent. Fourth century writings by Eusebius maintain that Jews and Christians were heavily persecuted toward the end of Domitian's reign. The Book of Revelation and First Epistle of Clement are thought by some to have been written during this period, the latter making mention of "sudden and repeated misfortunes", which are assumed to refer to persecutions under Domitian. Although Jews were heavily taxed, no contemporary authors give specific details of trials or executions based on religious offenses other than those within the Roman religion. Suetonius mentions having seen in his youth a nonagenarian being stripped by a procurator to see if he was circumcised.

=== Opposition ===
==== Revolt of Governor Saturninus (89) ====
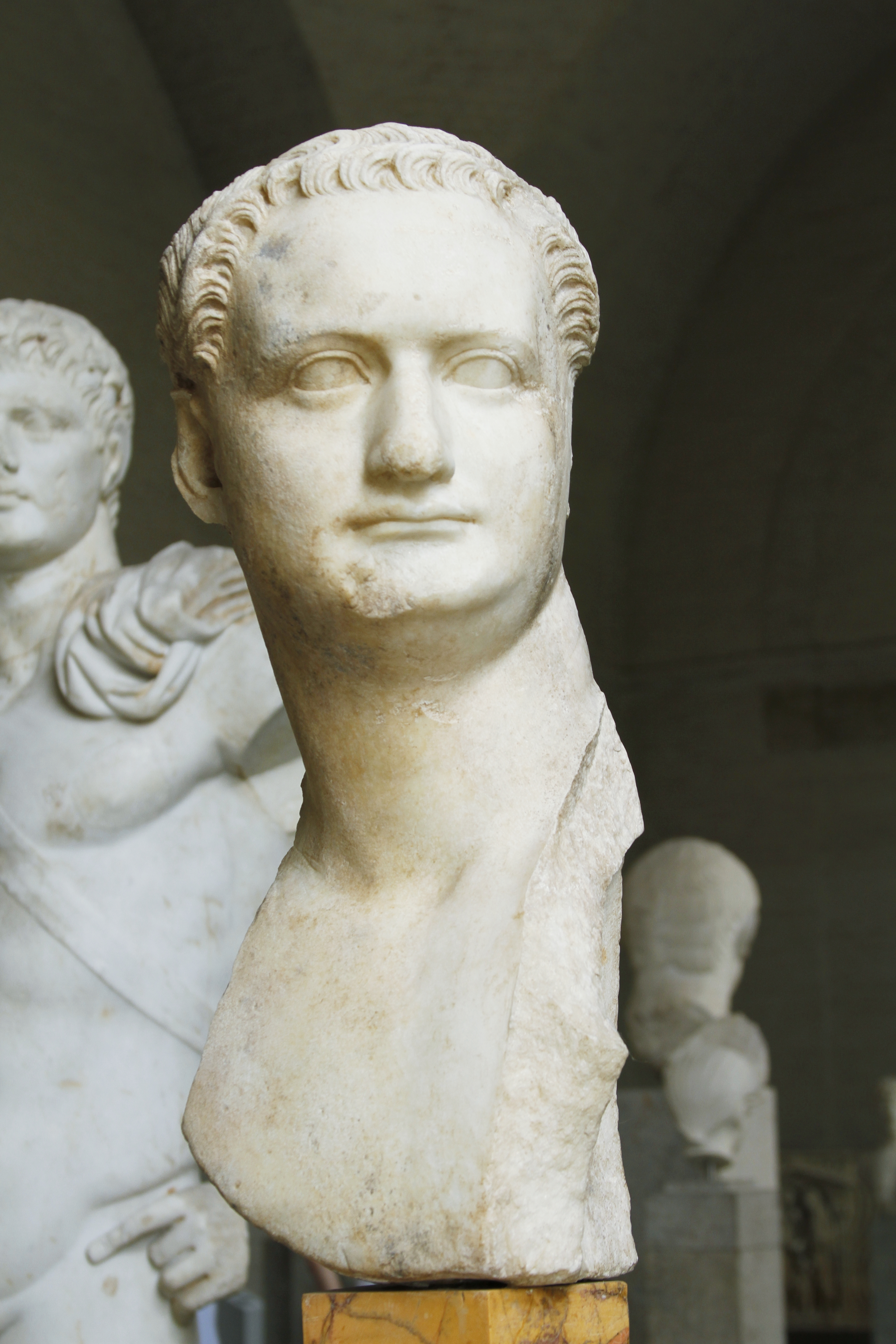
Domitian, Capitoline Museums, Rome

On 1 January 89, the governor of Germania Superior, Lucius Antonius Saturninus, and his two legions at Mainz, Legio XIV Gemina and Legio XXI Rapax, revolted against the Roman Empire with the aid of the Germanic Chatti people. The precise cause for the rebellion is uncertain, although it appears to have been planned well in advance. The Senatorial officers may have disapproved of Domitian's military strategies, such as his decision to fortify the German frontier rather than attack, as well as his recent retreat from Britain, and finally the disgraceful policy of appeasement toward Decebalus. At any rate, the uprising was strictly confined to Saturninus' province, and quickly detected once the rumour spread across the neighbouring provinces. The governor of Germania Inferior, Aulus Bucius Lappius Maximus, moved to the region at once, assisted by Titus Flavius Norbanus, the procurator of Rhaetia. From Spain, Trajan was summoned, while Domitian himself came from Rome with the Praetorian Guard.

By a stroke of luck, a thaw prevented the Chatti from crossing the Rhine and coming to Saturninus' aid. Within twenty-four days the rebellion was crushed, and its leaders at Mainz savagely punished. The mutinous legions were sent to the front in Illyricum, while those who had assisted in their defeat were duly rewarded. Lappius Maximus received the governorship of the province of Syria, a second consulship in May 95, and finally a priesthood, which he still held in 102. Titus Flavius Norbanus may have been appointed to the prefecture of Egypt, but almost certainly became prefect of the Praetorian Guard by 94, with Titus Petronius Secundus as his colleague. Domitian opened the year following the revolt by sharing the consulship with Marcus Cocceius Nerva, suggesting the latter had played a part in uncovering the conspiracy, perhaps in a fashion similar to the one he played during the Pisonian conspiracy under Nero. Although little is known about the life and career of Nerva before his accession as Emperor in 96, he appears to have been a highly adaptable diplomat, surviving multiple regime changes and emerging as one of the Flavians' most trusted advisors. His consulship may therefore have been intended to emphasize the stability and status quo of the regime. The revolt had been suppressed and the Empire returned to order.

==== Relationship with the Senate ====
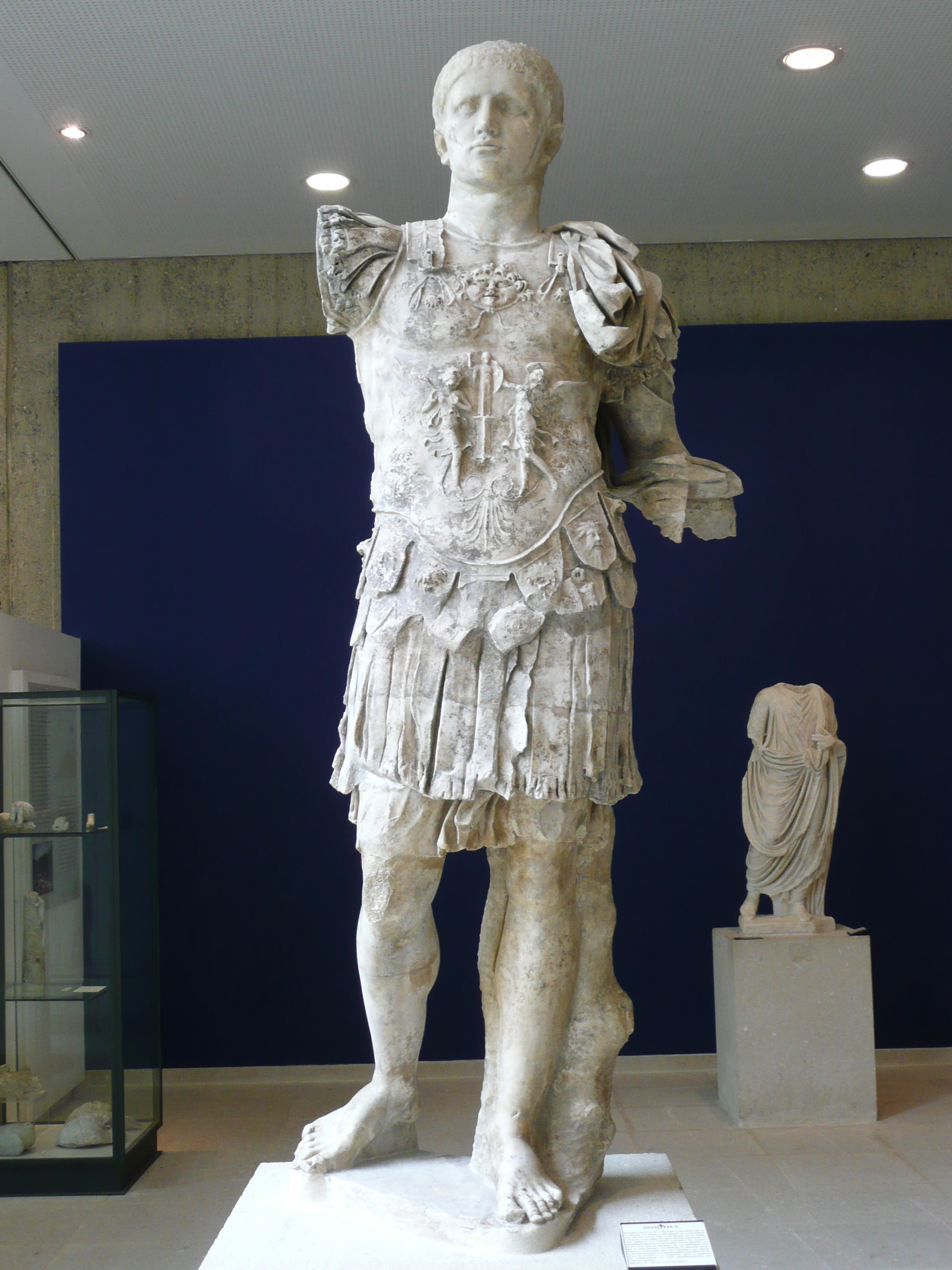
Domitian in military garb, wearing the muscle cuirass with decorative reliefs, from Vaison-la-Romaine, France

Since the fall of the Republic, the authority of the Roman Senate had largely eroded under the quasi-monarchical system of government established by Augustus, known as the Principate. The Principate allowed the existence of a de facto dictatorial regime, while maintaining the formal framework of the Roman Republic. Most Emperors upheld the public facade of democracy, and in return the Senate implicitly acknowledged the Emperor's status as a de facto monarch. Some rulers handled this arrangement with less subtlety than others. Domitian was not so subtle, often coming to the Senate as a triumpher and conqueror to show his disdain for them. From the outset of his reign, he stressed the reality of his autocracy. He disliked aristocrats and had no fear of showing it, withdrawing every decision-making power from the Senate to reduce its control to an administrative one, and instead relying on a small set of friends and equestrians to control the important offices of state.

The dislike was mutual. After Domitian's assassination, the senators of Rome rushed to the Senate house, where they immediately passed a motion condemning his memory to oblivion. Under the rulers of the Nervan-Antonian dynasty, senatorial authors published histories that elaborated on the view of Domitian as a tyrant. Nevertheless, the evidence suggests that Domitian did make concessions toward senatorial opinion. Whereas his father and brother had concentrated consular power largely in the hands of the Flavian family, Domitian admitted a surprisingly large number of provincials and potential opponents to the consulship, allowing them to head the official calendar by opening the year as an ordinary consul. Whether this was a genuine attempt to reconcile with hostile factions in the Senate cannot be ascertained. By offering the consulship to potential opponents, Domitian may have wanted to compromise these senators in the eyes of their supporters. When their conduct proved unsatisfactory, they were almost invariably brought to trial and exiled or executed, and their property was confiscated.

Both Tacitus and Suetonius speak of escalating persecutions toward the end of Domitian's reign, identifying a point of sharp increase around 93, or sometime after the failed revolt of Saturninus in 89. At least twenty senatorial opponents were executed, including Domitia Longina's former husband Lucius Aelius Lamia Plautius Aelianus and three of Domitian's own family members, Titus Flavius Sabinus, Titus Flavius Clemens and Marcus Arrecinus Clemens. Flavius Clemens was a cousin of Domitian, and the emperor had even designated Clemens' two young sons as his successors, calling them as "Vespasian" and "Domitian". Some of these men were executed as early as 83 or 85, however, lending little credit to Tacitus' notion of a "reign of terror" late in Domitian's reign. According to Suetonius, some were convicted for corruption or treason, others on trivial charges, which Domitian justified through his suspicion:

He used to say that the lot of Emperors was most unfortunate, since when they discovered a conspiracy, no one believed them unless they had been murdered.

Jones compares the executions of Domitian to those under Emperor Claudius (41–54), noting that Claudius executed around 35 senators and 300 equestrians, and yet was still deified by the Senate and regarded as one of the good Emperors of history. Domitian was apparently unable to gain support among the aristocracy, despite attempts to appease hostile factions with consular appointments. His autocratic style of government accentuated the Senate's loss of power, while his policy of treating patricians and even family members as equals to all Romans earned him their contempt.

== Death and succession ==
=== Assassination ===
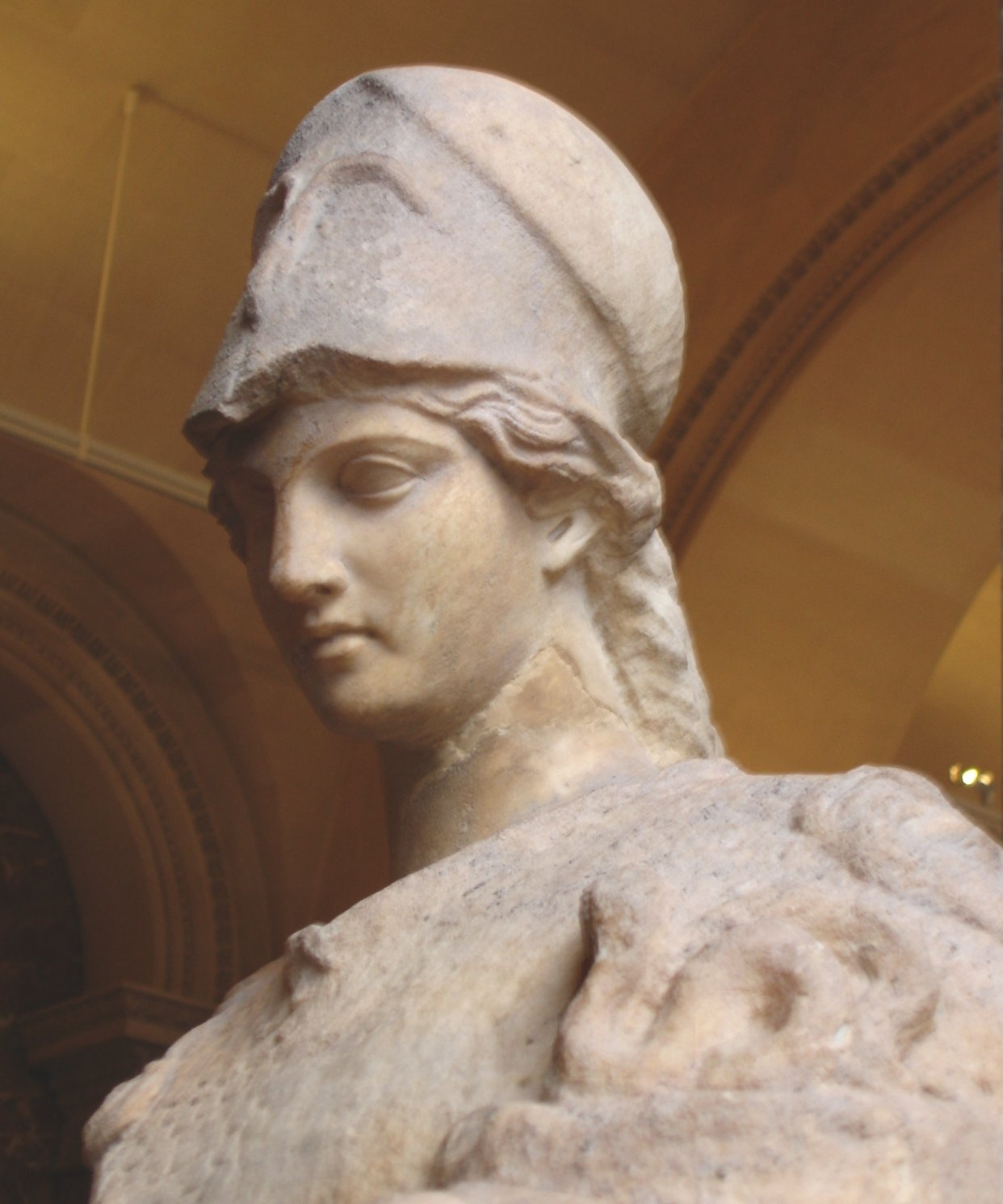
According to Suetonius, Domitian worshipped Minerva as his protector goddess with superstitious veneration. In a dream, she is said to have abandoned the emperor prior to the assassination.

Domitian was assassinated on 18 September 96 in a conspiracy by court officials. A highly detailed account of the plot and the assassination is provided by Suetonius. He alleges that Domitian's chamberlain Parthenius played the main role in the plot, and historian John Grainger cites Parthenius' likely fear over Domitian's recent execution of Nero's former secretary Epaphroditus as a possible motive. The act itself was carried out by a freedman of Parthenius named Maximus, and a steward of Domitian's niece Flavia Domitilla, named Stephanus. According to Suetonius, a number of omens had foretold Domitian's death.

According to an auspice he had received, the Emperor believed that his death would be at midday. As a result, he was always restless around that time. On the day of the assassination, Domitian was distressed and repeatedly asked a servant to tell him what time it was. The servant, who was himself one of the plotters, lied to the emperor, telling him that it was already late in the afternoon. Apparently put at ease, the Emperor went to his desk to sign some decrees. Stephanus, who had been feigning an injury to his arm for several days and wearing a bandage to allow him to carry a concealed dagger, suddenly appeared:

...he pretended that he had discovered a plot, and was for that reason granted an audience: whereupon, as the amazed Domitian perused a document he had handed him, Stephanus stabbed him in the groin. The wounded Emperor put up a fight, but succumbed to seven further stabs, his assailants being a subaltern named Clodianus, Parthenius's freedman Maximus, Satur, a head-chamberlain and one of the imperial gladiators.

During the attack, Stephanus and Domitian had struggled on the floor. Dio Cassius states that Stephanus was killed when those who were not part of the assassination rushed upon him. Domitian's body was carried away on a common bier and unceremoniously cremated by his nurse Phyllis. Later, she took the emperor's ashes to the Flavian Temple and mingled them with those of his niece, Julia. He was 44 years old. As had been foretold, his death came at midday. Cassius Dio, writing nearly a hundred years later, suggests that the assassination was improvised, while Suetonius implies it was a well-organized conspiracy, citing Stephanus' feigned injury and claiming that the doors to the servants' quarters had been locked prior to the attack and that a sword Domitian kept concealed beneath his pillow as a last line of personal protection against a would-be assassin, had also been removed beforehand. Dio included Domitia Longina among the conspirators, but in light of her attested devotion to Domitian—even years after her husband had died—her involvement in the plot seems highly unlikely. The precise involvement of the Praetorian Guard is unclear. One of the guard's commanders, Titus Petronius Secundus, was almost certainly aware of the plot. The other, Titus Flavius Norbanus, the former governor of Raetia, was a member of Domitian's family.

=== Succession and aftermath ===
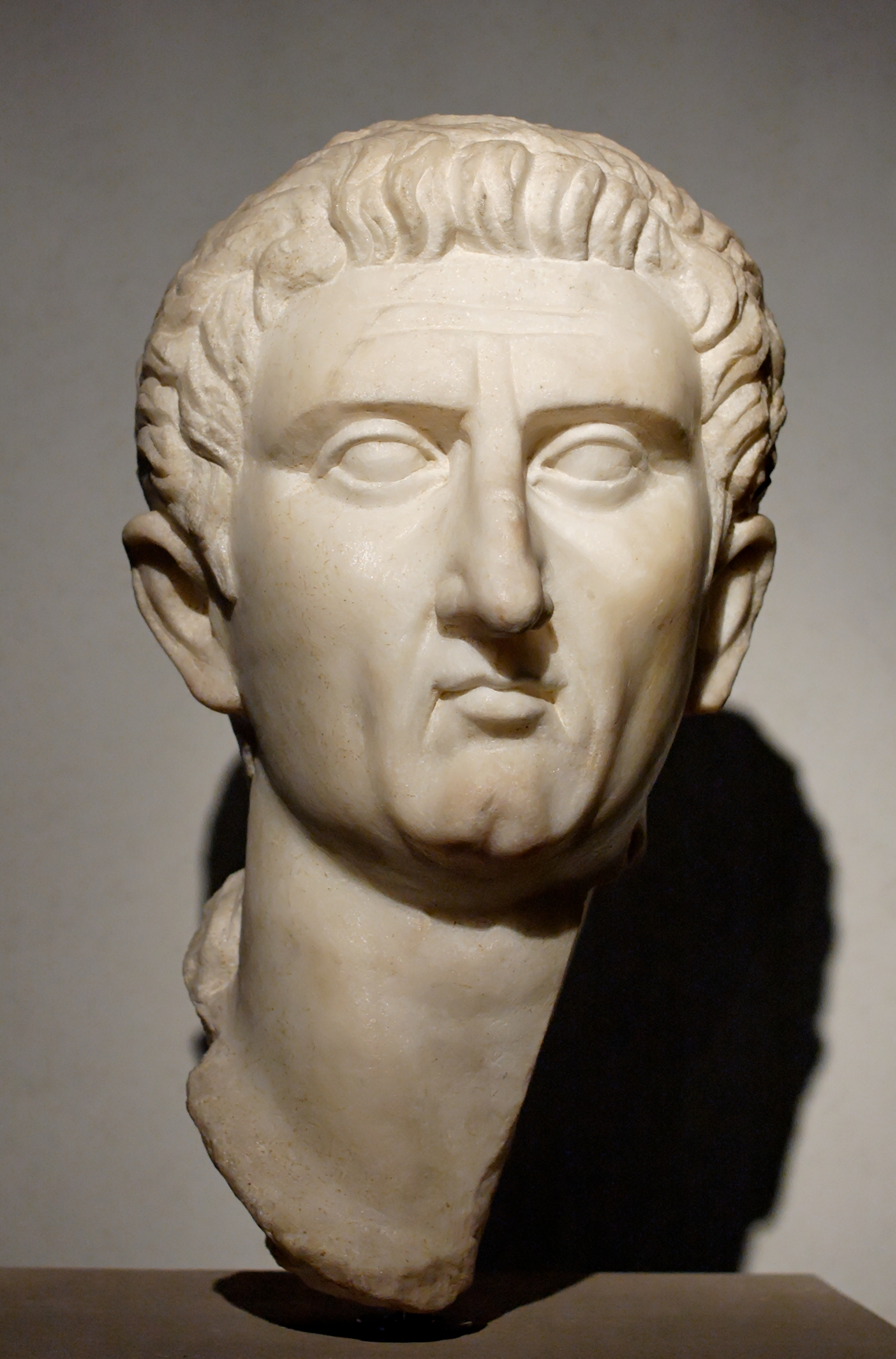
Upon the death of Domitian, Nerva was proclaimed Emperor by the Senate.

The Fasti Ostienses, the Ostian Calendar, records that on the same day as Domitian's assassination, the Senate proclaimed Marcus Cocceius Nerva emperor. Despite his political experience, this was a remarkable choice. Nerva was old and childless, and had spent much of his career out of the public light, prompting both ancient and modern authors to speculate on his involvement in Domitian's assassination. According to Cassius Dio, the conspirators approached Nerva as a potential successor prior to the assassination, suggesting that he was at least aware of the plot. He does not appear in Suetonius' version of the events, but this may be understandable, since his works were published under Nerva's direct descendants Trajan and Hadrian. To suggest the dynasty owed its accession to murder would have been less than sensitive. On the other hand, Nerva lacked widespread support in the Empire, and as a known Flavian loyalist, his track record would not have recommended him to the conspirators. The precise facts have been obscured by history, but modern historians believe Nerva was proclaimed Emperor solely on the initiative of the Senate, within hours after the news of the assassination broke.

The decision may have been hasty so as to avoid civil war, but neither appears to have been involved in the conspiracy. The Senate nonetheless rejoiced at the death of Domitian, and immediately following Nerva's accession as Emperor, passed damnatio memoriae on Domitian's memory; his coins and statues were melted, his arches were torn down and his name was erased from all public records. Domitian and, over a century later, Publius Septimius Geta were the only emperors known to have officially received a damnatio memoriae, though others may have received de facto ones. In many instances, existing portraits of Domitian, such as those found on the Cancelleria Reliefs, were simply recarved to fit the likeness of Nerva, which allowed quick production of new images and recycling of previous material. Yet the order of the Senate was only partially executed in Rome, and wholly disregarded in most of the provinces outside Italy.

According to Suetonius, the people of Rome met the news of Domitian's death with indifference, but the army was much grieved, calling for his deification immediately after the assassination, and in several provinces rioting. As a compensation measure, the Praetorian Guard demanded the execution of Domitian's assassins, which Nerva refused. Instead he merely dismissed Titus Petronius Secundus, and replaced him with a former commander, Casperius Aelianus. Dissatisfaction with this state of affairs continued to loom over Nerva's reign, and ultimately erupted into a crisis in October 97, when members of the Praetorian Guard, led by Casperius Aelianus, laid siege to the Imperial Palace and took Nerva hostage. He was forced to submit to their demands, agreeing to hand over those responsible for Domitian's death and even giving a speech thanking the rebellious Praetorians. Titus Petronius Secundus and Parthenius were sought out and killed. Nerva was unharmed in this assault, but his authority was damaged beyond repair. Shortly thereafter he announced the adoption of Trajan as his successor, and with this decision nearly abdicated.

== Flavian family tree ==
FLAVIAN DYNASTY detailed family tree

Titus Flavius Petro	Tertulla	Vespasius Pollio	Julia the Younger
Titus Flavius Sabinus	Vespasia Polla	Vespasius (praetor)	Aemilia Lepida	Agrippina the Elder	Germanicus
Titus Flavius Sabinus	Vespasian (69–79)	Domitilla the Elder	Flavia (died young)	Junia Lepida	Vistilia
Titus Flavius Sabinus	Domitilla the Younger	Titus (79–81)	Arrecina Tertulla	Cassia Longina	Gnaeus Domitius Corbulo	Caesonia	Caligula (37–41)
Titus Flavius Sabinus	Titus Flavius Clemens	Flavia Domitilla	Julia Flavia	Domitian (81–96)	Domitia Longina	Domitia
Flavius Caesar

== Legacy ==
=== Ancient sources ===
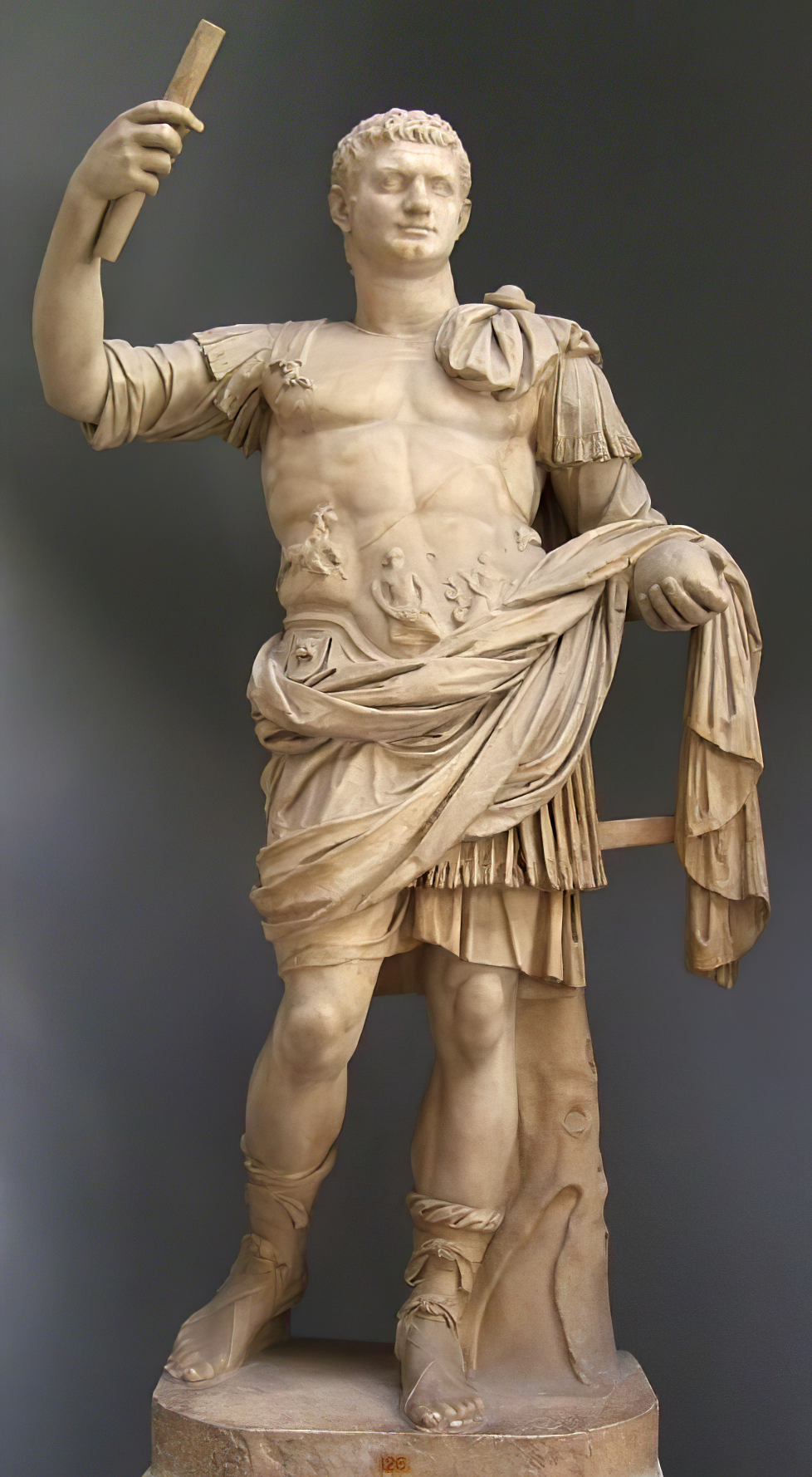
Domitian as Emperor (Vatican Museums), likely recut from a statue of Nero

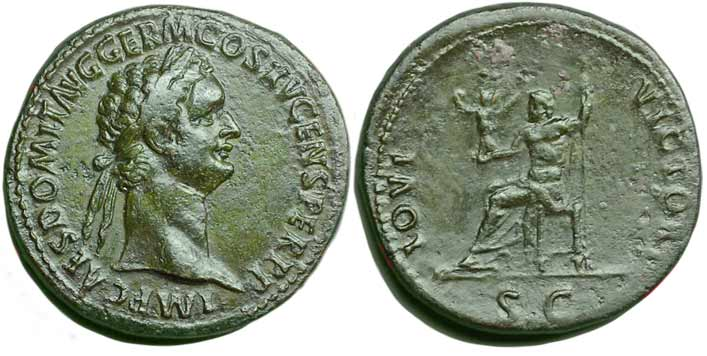
A sestertius of Domitian. The text on the obverse is an abbreviation of 'Imperator Caesar Domitianus Augustus Germanicus, Consul for the fourth time, Censor in perpetuity'. The text on the reverse translates as 'Victorious Jupiter'.

The classic view of Domitian is usually negative, since most of the antique sources were related to the Senatorial or aristocratic class, with which Domitian had notoriously difficult relations. Furthermore, contemporary historians such as Pliny the Younger, Tacitus and Suetonius all wrote after his reign when his memory had been condemned to oblivion by the Senate. The work of Domitian's court poets Martial and Statius constitutes virtually the only literary evidence concurrent with his reign. Perhaps as unsurprising as the attitude of post-Domitianic historians, the poems of Martial and Statius are highly adulatory, praising Domitian's achievements as equalling those of the gods. The most extensive account of the life of Domitian to survive was written by the historian Suetonius, who was born during the reign of Vespasian, and published his works under Emperor Hadrian (117–138). His De vita Caesarum is the source of much of what is known of Domitian. Although his text is predominantly negative, it neither exclusively condemns nor praises Domitian, and asserts that his rule started well, but gradually declined into terror. The biography is problematic, however, in that it appears to contradict itself with regards to Domitian's rule and personality, at the same time presenting him as a conscientious, moderate man, and as a decadent libertine.

According to Suetonius, Domitian wholly feigned his interest in arts and literature, and never bothered to acquaint himself with classic authors. Other passages, alluding to Domitian's love of epigrammatic expression, suggest that he was in fact familiar with classic writers, while he also patronized poets and architects, founded artistic Olympics, and personally restored the library of Rome at great expense after it had burned down. De Vita Caesarum is also the source of several outrageous stories regarding Domitian's married life. According to Suetonius, Domitia Longina was exiled in 83 because of an affair with a famous actor named Paris. When Domitian found out, he allegedly murdered Paris in the street and promptly divorced his wife, with Suetonius further adding that once Domitia was exiled, Domitian took Julia as his mistress, who later died during a failed abortion. Modern historians consider this highly implausible however, noting that malicious rumours such as those concerning Domitia's alleged infidelity were eagerly repeated by post-Domitianic authors, and used to highlight the hypocrisy of a ruler publicly preaching a return to Augustan morals, while privately indulging in excesses and presiding over a corrupt court.

Nevertheless, the account of Suetonius has dominated imperial historiography for centuries. Although Tacitus is usually considered to be the most reliable author of this era, his views on Domitian are complicated by the fact that his father-in-law, Gnaeus Julius Agricola, may have been a personal enemy of the Emperor. In his biographical work Agricola, Tacitus maintains that Agricola was forced into retirement because his triumph over the Caledonians highlighted Domitian's own inadequacy as a military commander. Several modern authors such as Dorey have argued the opposite: that Agricola was in fact a close friend of Domitian, and that Tacitus merely sought to distance his family from the fallen dynasty once Nerva was in power.

Tacitus' major historical works, including The Histories and Agricola's biography, were all written and published under Domitian's successors, Nerva (96–98) and Trajan (98–117). Unfortunately, the part of Tacitus' Histories dealing with the reign of the Flavian dynasty is almost entirely lost. His views on Domitian survive through brief comments in its first five books, and the short but highly negative characterization in Agricola in which he severely criticizes Domitian's military endeavours. Nevertheless, Tacitus admits his debt to the Flavians with regard to his own public career. Other influential 2nd century authors include Juvenal and Pliny the Younger, the latter of whom was a friend of Tacitus and in 100 delivered his famous Panegyricus Traiani before Trajan and the Roman Senate, exalting the new era of restored freedom while condemning Domitian as a tyrant. Juvenal savagely satirized the Domitianic court in his Satires, depicting the Emperor and his entourage as corrupt, violent and unjust. As a consequence, the anti-Domitianic tradition was already well established by the end of the 2nd century, and by the 3rd century, even expanded upon by early Church historians, who identified Domitian as an early persecutor of Christians, such as in the Acts of John.

=== Modern revisionism ===
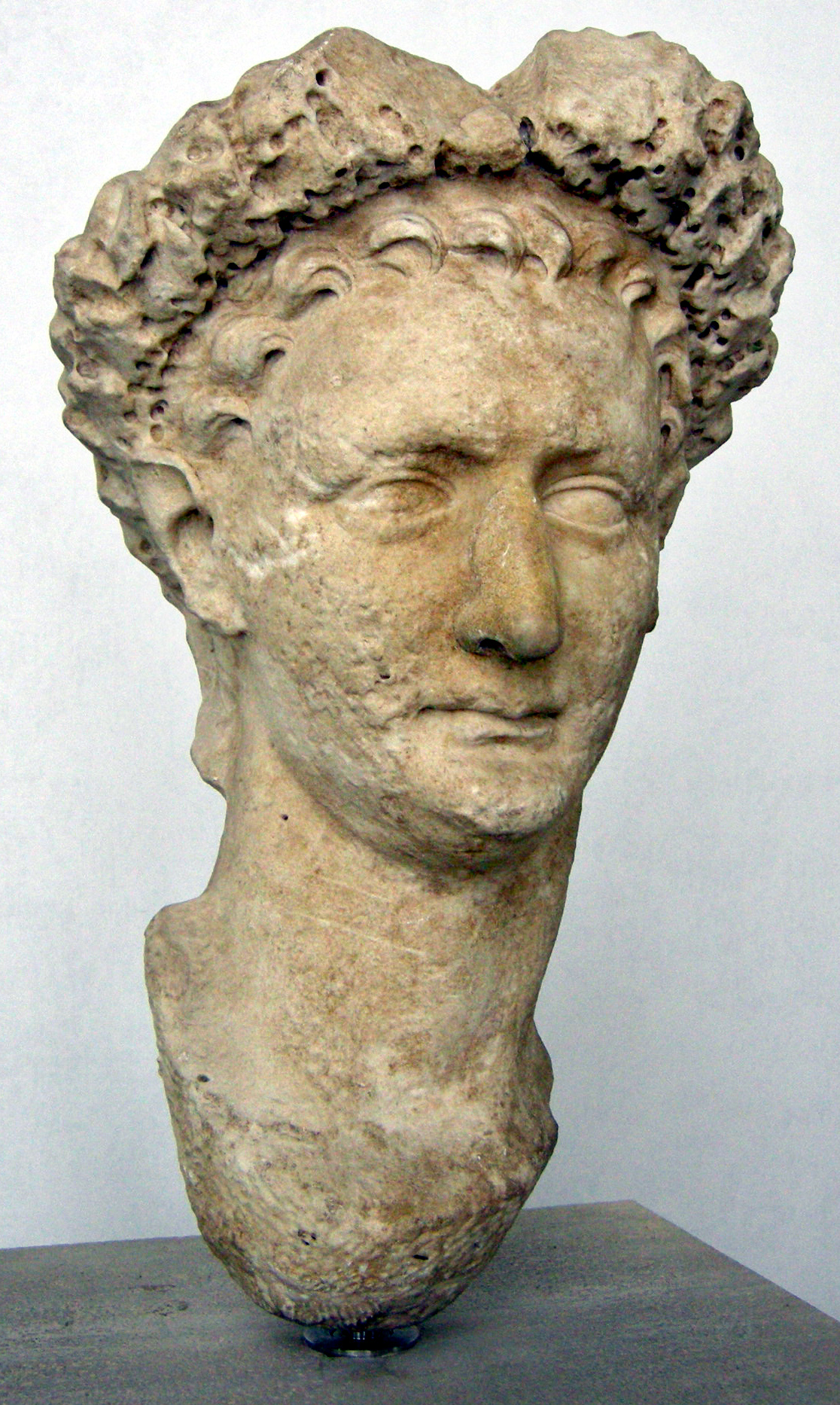
Bust of Domitian wearing the civic crown, 81–96 AD, from the Palazzo Massimo alle Terme, Rome

Over the course of the 20th century, Domitian's military, administrative and economic policies were re-evaluated. Hostile views of Domitian had been propagated until archeological and numismatic advances brought renewed attention to his reign, and necessitated a revision of the literary tradition established by Tacitus and Pliny. It would be nearly a hundred years after Stéphane Gsell's 1894 Essai sur le règne de l'empereur Domitien however, before any new, book-length studies were published. The first of these was Jones' 1992 The Emperor Domitian. He concludes that Domitian was a ruthless but efficient autocrat. For the majority of his reign, there was no widespread dissatisfaction with his policies. His harshness was limited to a highly vocal minority, who exaggerated his despotism in favor of the Nervan-Antonine dynasty that followed. His foreign policy was realistic, rejecting expansionist warfare and negotiating peace at a time when Roman military tradition dictated aggressive conquest. Persecution of religious minorities, such as Jews and Christians, was non-existent.

In 1930, Ronald Syme argued for a complete reassessment of Domitian's financial policy, which had been largely viewed as a disaster. His economic program, which was rigorously efficient, maintained the Roman currency at a standard it would never again achieve. Domitian's government nonetheless exhibited totalitarian characteristics. As Emperor, he saw himself as the new Augustus, an enlightened despot destined to guide the Roman Empire into a new era of Flavian renaissance. Using religious, military and cultural propaganda, he fostered a cult of personality. He deified three of his family members and erected massive structures to commemorate the Flavian achievements. Elaborate triumphs were celebrated in order to boost his image as a warrior-emperor, but many of these were either unearned or premature. By nominating himself perpetual censor, he sought to control public and private morals. He started several major construction projects in Rome including the Aqua Traiana and the Baths of Trajan.

He became personally involved in all branches of the government and successfully prosecuted corruption among public officials. The dark side of his censorial power involved a restriction in freedom of speech, and an increasingly oppressive attitude toward the Roman Senate. He punished libel with exile or death and, due to his suspicious nature, increasingly accepted information from informers to bring false charges of treason if necessary. Despite his vilification by contemporary historians, Domitian's administration provided the foundation for the Principate of the peaceful 2nd century. His successors Nerva and Trajan were less restrictive, but in reality their policies differed little from his. The Roman Empire prospered between 81 and 96, in a reign that Theodor Mommsen described as a somber but intelligent despotism.

== See also ==
- Cultural depictions of Domitian
- List of Roman emperors

== Notes ==
Domitian Flavian dynasty Born: 24 October AD 51 Died: 18 September AD 96
Political offices
Preceded by Titus	Roman emperor 81–96	Succeeded by Nerva
Preceded by Vespasian V Titus III	Roman consul 73 with L. Valerius Catullus Messallinus	Succeeded by Vespasian VI; Titus IV
Preceded by Vespasian IX; Titus VII	Roman consul 80 with Titus VIII	Succeeded by L. Flavius Silva; M. Asinius Pollio Verrucosus
Preceded by L. Flavius Silva; M. Asinius Pollio Verrucosus	Roman consul 82–88	Succeeded by T. Aurelius Fulvus; M. Asinius Atratinus
Preceded by T. Aurelius Fulvus; M. Asinius Atratinus	Roman consul 90 with Marcus Cocceius Nerva II	Succeeded by M.' Acilius Glabrio; Trajan
Preceded by M.' Acilius Glabrio; Trajan	Roman consul 92 with Q. Volusius Saturninus	Succeeded by Sex. Pompeius Collega; Q. Peducaeus Priscinus
Preceded by L. Nonius Calpurnius Torquatus Asprenas; T. Sextius Magius Lateranus	Roman consul 95 with T. Flavius Clemens	Succeeded by C. Manlius Valens; C. Antistius Vetus
