= Temple of Jupiter Custos =

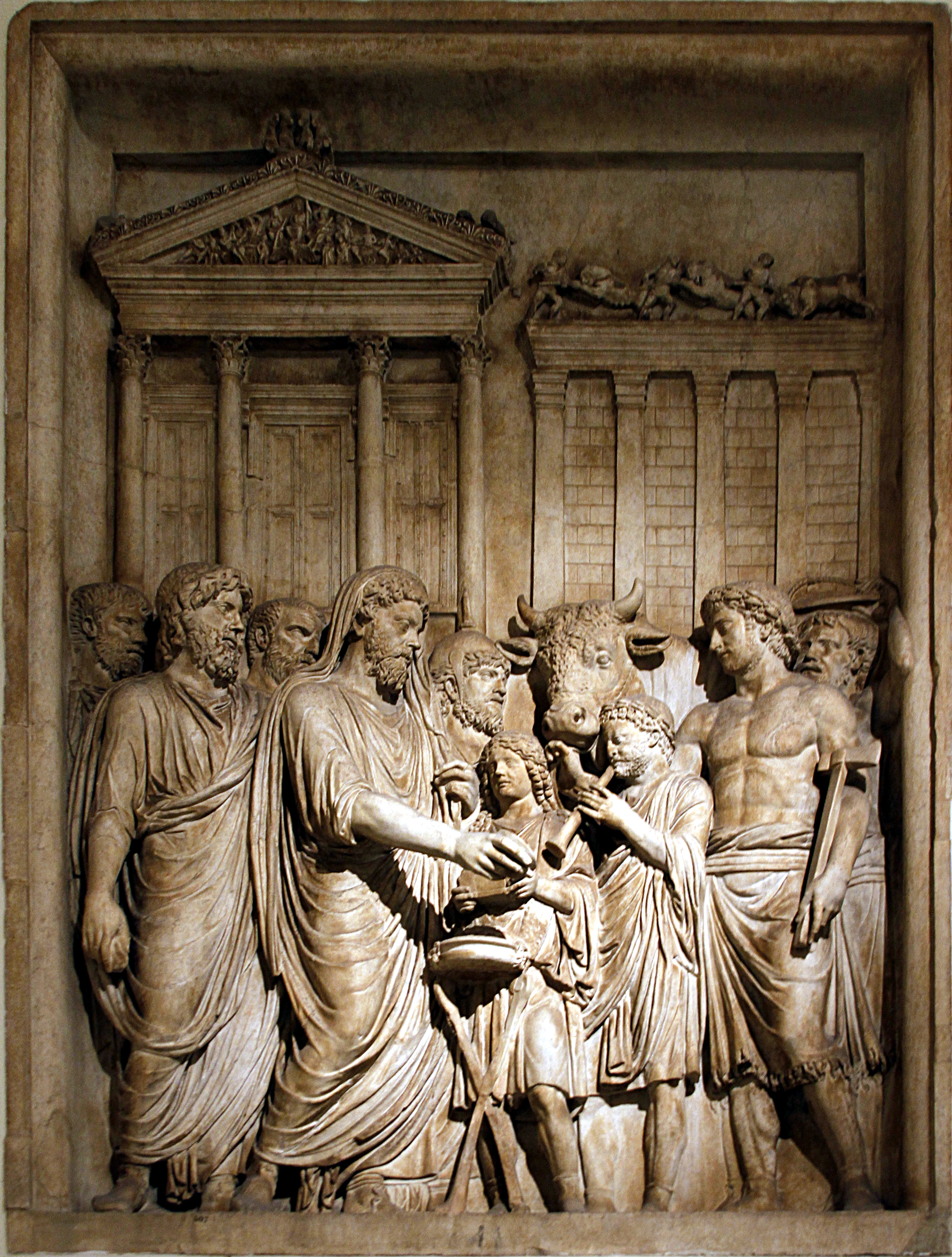
- In the background of this relief from the reign of Marcus Aurelius are the temples of Jupiter Best and Greatest (left) and Jupiter the Guardian (right), Palazzo dei Conservatori – this is the main evidence for the two being sited next to each other.

- Shown in ancient Rome
- Interactive map of Temple of Jupiter Custos
- 41°53′30.57″N 12°28′54.81″E

The Temple of Jupiter Custos (Jupiter the Guardian) was a minor temple in Rome, probably on the Capitoline Hill. It was built by Domitian in memory of his narrow escape from the Capitol during Vitellius' siege. Its site is uncertain – some scholars place it on the rectangular podium in opus caementicium with basalt chips discovered in the 19th century during the construction of via del Tempio di Giove (this podium is now cut in two by the street). However, that rectangular plan does not seem compatible with a temple, which a relief in the Palazzo dei Conservatori places to the right of the Temple of Jupiter Optimus Maximus.

== See also ==
- List of Ancient Roman temples

== Bibliography ==
- Filippo Coarelli, Guida archeologica di Roma, Verona, Arnoldo Mondadori Editore, 1984.
