= Cultural depictions of Domitian =

Domitian was Roman emperor from 81 to 96 AD.

== Literature ==
- The Roman Actor (1626), a play by Philip Massinger that features Domitian as the main character.
- Domitia (1898), a historical novel by Sabine Baring-Gould
- Josephus and the Emperor (1942; earlier Der Tag wird kommen), historical novel by Lion Feuchtwanger, in which a cruel and hypocritical Domitian suggests the tyranny of Adolf Hitler.
- The Far Arena (1978), science fiction novel by Richard Sapir. It describes events in the life of Eugeni, a Roman gladiator of Domitian's time, who is frozen in ice for nearly 2,000 years and then revived. Eugeni recalls Domitian as a brutal tyrant.
- The Ravishers (1980), a historical romance by Jeanne Duval, about a Gallic princess who is enslaved in Rome and survives the Year of the Four Emperors
- Killer (1985), a science fiction novel by Karl Edward Wagner and David Drake, is set in Domitian's Rome, and Domitian appears in the novel.
- The Triumph (1986), a historical novel by Ernest K. Gann, features a villainous Domitian.
- The Marcus Didius Falco series of crime novels (1989— ) by Lindsey Davis, set during the reign of Vespasian. Domitian appears as a peripheral character, and is named as the primary suspect in the murder being investigated in the first novel, Silver Pigs.
  - The companion series, featuring Falco's adoptive daughter, Flavia Albia, takes place during the reign of Domitian.
  - Master and God (2012), a historical novel by Davis, centers around the reign of Domitian.
- The Light Bearer (1994), a historical novel by Donna Gillespie.
- Domitia and Domitian (2000), a historical novel by David Corson based on the works of Brian Jones and Pat Southern, revolving around the title characters.
- The Roman Mysteries series of young adult novels by Caroline Lawrence features Domitian as a peripheral character, in which he is depicted as indolent and cruel, and responsible for several plots to undermine his brother Titus's popularity;
- Mistress of Rome (2010), a historical novel by Kate Quinn where Domitian's skills as an emperor are tarnished by his personal cruelty and suspicion towards those around him.
- Roman Hell (2010), a historical novel by Mark Mellon, fictionalizes the rise and fall of Domitian and suggests he may have had a role in his brother's death.
- Roman Games: A Plinius Secundus Mystery (2010), a crime novel by Bruce Macbain, featuring Pliny the Younger;
- Blood of Caesar, a crime novel by Albert Bell, Junior, featuring Pliny as detective with the historian Tacitus as his sidekick, during Domitian's reign;
- Empire, an epic novel of imperial Rome by Steven Saylor depicting four generations of a Roman family and their relationships with every emperor from Augustus to Hadrian, with Domitian as a major character.
- "Los Asesinos del Emperador" (2011), a novel (in Spanish) by Spanish writer Santiago Posteguillo.

== Film and television ==
- La Rivolta dei Pretoriani (The Revolt of the Praetorians, 1964), Italian film directed by Alfonso Brescia, concerning a fictional plot to overthrow Domitian (Piero Lulli), who has grown into a cruel and murderous despot, which is in the end joined by the Praetorian Guard.
- Dacii (1967), Romanian film directed by Sergiu Nicolaescu about the Dacian campaign of Domitian, with György Kovács as Domitian.
- Age of Treason (1993), English television film, featuring Marcus Didius Falco from the crime novels by Lindsey Davis. The story is set during the reign of Vespasian, with Domitian, played by Jamie Glover, as a peripheral character.
- San Giovanni - L'apocalisse (2003), English telefilm concerning the purported persecution of Christians under Domitian, who is played by Bruce Payne.
- The Roman Mysteries, a TV miniseries based on the novels by Caroline Lawrence - Domitian appears in the episode, The Assassins of Rome, portrayed by Duncan Duff.
- Those About to Die (TV series), a TV miniseries about the rise and fall of Titus and the eventual rise of Domitian. Domitian appears across the series and is played by Jojo Macari.
