= Land of Onias =

Region of Egypt where Judeans settled

The Land of Onias (Koine Greek: Ὀνίας) is the name given in Jewish, Roman, and Hellenistic period sources to an area in the Nile Delta of the Ptolemaic Kingdom where a large number of Second Temple-era Jews settled. The Land of Onias, which included the city of Leontopolis (Λεόντων πόλις), was located in the Heliopolite Nome (Hebrew: אֹן ʾOn "Heliopolis).

While accounts differ on the details, it is known that the Jews of Leontopolis had a functioning temple, distinct from and contemporary to the Temple in Jerusalem, presided over by kohanim (priests) and High Priests of the family of Onias III or Onias IV, for whom the "Land of Onias" is named. Aside from a somewhat uncertain allusion of the Hellenist Artapanus of Alexandria, only Josephus gives information about this temple.

The Talmudic accounts are internally contradictory. The establishment of a central sanctuary in Egypt was probably undertaken in response, in part, to the disorders that arose in Judea under the reign of Antiochus IV Epiphanes. In the wake of his defeat against Ptolemaic Egypt in the Sixth Syrian War, Antiochus sacked Jerusalem in 168 BCE; he banned local religious practices, desecrated and sealed up the Second Temple, and supplanted the Sons of Zadok, considered the legitimate family of the High Priesthood. The vast extent of the Jewish diaspora in Egypt in the wake of these events created a demand for a new sanctuary.

at its pinnacle Onias’ Temple was a major religious and cultural center of Egyptian Judaism. This assumption is bolstered by the circumstance that several works of Jewish-Hellenistic literature such as 3 Maccabees, Pseudo-Hecataeus, Joseph & Aseneth, and several oracles of the Third Book of the Sibylline Oracles appear to have been written in the milieu of the Oniad Temple.

— Meron-Martin Piotrkowski, Priests in Exile

== Jewish temple at Leontopolis (c. 170 BCE – 73 CE) ==
The account of Josephus in The Jewish War refers to the Onias who built the Temple at Leontopolis as "the son of Simon", implying that it was Onias III, and not his son, who fled to Egypt and built the Temple. This account, however, is contradicted by the story that Onias III was murdered in Antioch in 171 BCE. Josephus' account in the Antiquities is considered by some to be more probable, namely, that the builder of the temple was a son of the murdered Onias III and that, a mere youth at the time of his father's death, he had fled to the court of Alexandria in consequence of the Syrian persecutions, perhaps because he thought that salvation would come to his people from Egypt. Others contend that the story of Onias III's murder is of dubious historical accuracy, instead being based on the story of the murder of Antiochus IV Epiphanes’ nephew, which actually occurred, in part because it is difficult to believe Antiochus IV would be heartbroken at the death of Onias III (a political opponent), as the story of his murder in 2 Maccabees claims, and in part because the stories are very similar. 2 Maccabees seems to have instead possibly, assigned the story of Onias III's flight to Egypt to a character named "Philip" for thematic reasons, as evidenced by there inexplicably being two "Philips" that were close to Antiochus in the narrative that cannot be the same person, an act which implies the author knew of the story of Onias III's flight to Egypt, and similarly made Onias into a martyr for primarily thematic purposes. Notably, Theodore of Mopsuestia's Commentary on the Psalms 54(55) rejects the Maccabean narrative and states that Onias III fled to Egypt. He uses this account as a source for the rest of the passage, possibly having learned of it from a piece of Rabbinic literature. Theodore seems to consider 2 Maccabees to be less reliable because he lived in the area where the alleged murder took place, and there is a lack of evidence suggesting that the city was aware of the event.

Ptolemy VI Philometor was pharaoh at that time. He probably had not yet given up his claims to Coele-Syria and Judea and gladly gave refuge to such a prominent personage of the neighboring country. Onias now requested the king and his sister-wife Cleopatra II allow him to build a sanctuary in Egypt similar to the one at Jerusalem, where he would employ Levites and priests of his clan; he referred to the prediction of Isaiah 19:19 that a temple would be erected in Egypt.

According to Josephus, the temple of Leontopolis existed for 343 years but the general opinion is that this number must be changed to 243. He relates that the Roman emperor Vespasian feared that through this temple, Egypt might become a new center for Jewish–Roman wars and therefore ordered the governor of Egypt, Tiberius Julius Lupus, to demolish it. Lupus died in the process of carrying out the order, and the task of stripping the temple of its treasures, barring access to it, and removing all traces of divine worship at the site was completed by his successor, Gaius Valerius Paulinus, which dates the event to c. March–August 73.

In his dig at Tell al-Yahudi in 1905/6, Flinders Petrie identified the remains of this temple.

=== Onias' letters ===
Josephus quotes Onias's letter to the royal couple and the king's answer to Onias. Both of these, however, appear spurious on the following grounds: Onias refers in his letter to his military exploits in Coele-Syria and Phoenicia, although it is not sure that the general Onias and the priest Onias are identical. His assertion that a central sanctuary is necessary because a multiplicity of temples causes dissension evidences imperfect knowledge of religious life and his request for the ruined temple of the Egyptian goddess Bastet because a sufficient supply of wood and sacrificial animals would be found there seems unwise and improbable for a suppliant who must first obtain compliance with his principal request. In the second letter, it seems strange that the pagan king points out to a kohen that the proposed temple building contradicts Biblical law and that he consents only given Isaiah's prophecy. Both letters were written by a Hellenistic Jew.

Meron M. Piotrkowski contends that the letters were held in the Leontopolis Temple's archive, seized by the Romans alongside temple valuables during its closure at the hands of the empire, and were used later as a source by Josephus when writing. He holds that the anti-Onias sentiments in his recounting of the letters did not come from the letter itself (which has been used to support an Alexandrian Jewish origin), but were inserted by Josephus. The purging of a pagan temple, or pagan elements from a temple, is not without precedent in Judaism, as Hezekiah purged the Jerusalem temple of pagan influences. Hezekiah and Onias were paralleled in the works of pseudo-Hecataeus, perhaps intentionally, with this being an example. Paralleling the two events casts Onias's choice of the temple site in a positive light. Pseudo-Hecataeus's On the Jews was an Egyptian Jewish work and his Hezekiah story may have been partly aimed at comforting Judeans that came to Egypt as refugees like Onias and his community in Egypt, were. The rededication of native Egyptian shrines for use by foreign soldiers near where they settled was a common practice in the Ptolemaic era as well, as it increased security against uprisings, which provides context and precedent for Onias and Ptolemy's decisions in the matter, with Onias following standard government procedure as the leader of a group of foreign mercenaries by finding an abandoned or ruined shrine to Bubastis, and requesting he be allowed to establish a temple there – though, in his case, not to a pagan deity, but to his God.

The reference in the letters of Onias of his presence at Coele-Syria and Phoenicia is also potentially evidence that the Onias that founded the Leontopolis Temple was Onias III, not Onias IV, as there was no military conflict in the region that Onias IV could have served in, while the Sixth Syrian War matches up with Onias III's lifespan. This is a conclusion supported by Josephus stating that Onias III belonged to a pro-Ptolemaic faction in Jerusalem during a time that overlaps with the Sixth Syrian War.

=== Layout of the temple ===
Only this can be stated as a fact that the temple of Leontopolis was built on the site of a ruined temple of Bastet in imitation of the temple at Jerusalem, though smaller and less elaborate. The statement in Wars of the Jews vii. 10, § 2 of Onias' argument that by building this temple, the Jewish nation would be brought to turn from the Syrians to the Ptolemies seems very plausible and may have given rise to the assertion made in the letters that there were disputes among the Jews. The "fortress" (ὀχύρωμα) of the temple of Bubastis may be explained by the statement, which seems credible, that Onias built a fortress (θρωύριον) around the temple to protect the surrounding territory, which now received the designation "Oneion". It is also possible this was simply part of standard Ptolemaic practice regarding settling foreign soldiers near or at temple sites.

The Onias temple was not exactly similar to the Temple at Jerusalem, being more in the form of a high tower, and as regards the interior arrangement, it had didn't have a Temple menorah but a hanging lamp. The building had a court (τέμενος) surrounded by a brick wall with stone gates. The king endowed the temple with large revenues—a fact that may have suggested to the writer of the letters mentioned above the wealth of wood and sacrificial animals.

=== Legitimacy of its sacrificial cult ===
The reputation that the temple of Onias enjoyed is indicated by the fact that the Septuagint, written in the Jewish community of Alexandria, changes the phrase "city of destruction" in Isaiah 19:18 to "city of righteousness" (πόλις ἀσεδέκ). The Egyptian Jews frequently sacrificed in the temple of Leontopolis. At the same time, they fulfilled their duty toward the Temple at Jerusalem, as Philo narrates that he did.

The Temple at Leontopolis never gained the popularity of Jerusalem. While Alexandrine Jews might like having a subordinate temple close to home, support for the Oniad Temple never replaced the need to send tithes and pilgrims to Jerusalem. Indeed, the Leontopolis temple site seems never to have achieved even the importance of the synagogue in Alexandria's Jewish quarter or the earlier Temple to Yahweh at Elephantine in Upper Egypt.

In the later Talmud of Rabbinic Judaism, the origin of the temple of Onias (Hebrew: בֵּית חוֹנְיוֹ, romanized: Bēt Ḥonyo) is narrated with legendary additions, with two versions of the account in Menahot. Here, Onias is mentioned again as the son of Simon, and Isaiah's prophecy is referred to. The temple of Onias was considered forbidden but not idolatry: Menahot 109b:9: בֵּית חוֹנְיוֹ לָאו עֲבוֹדָה זָרָה הוּא Bēt Ḥonyo lāw ʿabodā zārā hu. The possibility of the priests of Onias being admitted to officiate at the Jerusalem Temple was explicitly stated, while one passage even expresses the view that sacrificial worship was permissible in the temple of Onias; however, this view was rejected in Megillah 10a, as it is based on the view that idolatry was not performed there. The opinion was prevalent among the rabbis that the temple of Onias was situated at Alexandria—an error repeated by all the chroniclers of the Middle Ages. It is also sometimes confused or conflated with the Mount Gerizim Temple of the Samaritans.

== Literature ==
Piotrkowski puts forth that the characteristics when trying to determine if a work may be of Oniad Jewish origin are if it is in Greek (the lingua franca for the time and place), if it is known to be of Jewish Egyptian origin (especially if it references Heliopolis or the chora), themes and references involving temples or priests (such as those ideas themselves, their importance, purity, and cultic things), references to the military, references to the loyalty of Egyptian Jews to Egyptian rulers (especially the Ptolemies), and intimacy with the dealings and protocols of courtly life. These characteristics do not automatically make an Oniad Jewish origin the most likely one, but they would likely appear. The Jewish diaspora overall is marked by a lack of access to a temple and therefore a decreased importance of priests; works of Egyptian Jewish origin that emphasize the priesthood imply there was a temple the author was involved with.

It is thought that Joseph and Asenath, a novel reconstructed by Bohak, may be authored by an Oniad Jew. The story is set in Heliopolis, a site of importance to Jews and said to be where Joseph settled in Jubilees, the Testament of Joseph, and Josephus's Antiquities. It was also associated with the Onias temple, to the point where Heliopolis was sometimes called On/Onias in the Hellenistic and Roman periods. In Hebrew, Heliopolis is indeed called On. Bohak has interpreted a scene involving Asenath, an angel, and some unusual bees (half of whom create a second honeycomb on her mouth after she takes a bite from a magical one, and half of whom try to attack her) as a metaphorical reference to the founding of the temple at Leontopolis.

The Third and Fifth Sibylline Oracles may also be of Oniad origin. The Fifth Oracle contains a prophecy discussing the rebuilding of a Jewish temple in Egypt. The Third Oracle encourages gentiles (particularly Greeks) to renounce idolatry and accept Judaism; however, it does not discuss circumcision, which may imply a priestly authorship, as priests (being born to their position) would conceive of conversion as a process by which one accepts the faith but cannot become a "full Jew". The combination of factors that the Third Oracle is commonly thought to be of 1) Egyptian origin, 2) Jewish origin, and 3) this indication of priestly authorship, among other factors, would make the possibility that the author was affiliated with the temple at Leontopolis reasonably likely.

3 Maccabees is another work of interest, especially the "Episode in the Hippodrome". This episode is the imprisonment and threat of genocide carried out against Jews in the Hippodrome near Alexandria, halted either by divine miracle or Onias and his troops. The text itself endorses a celebration commemorating deliverance from this threat. It also contrasts the prayers of an Egyptian Jewish priest from the chora (answered by God with divine salvation, showing His face, and the ruler responsible repents) with the high priest praying for God to appear to save the temple in Jerusalem (the temple is saved, but God's manifestation is not stated, and the wicked ruler does not repent). There is also a section (7:20) possibly referencing royal permission being granted to build a temple, with word choices similar to letters allegedly written between Onias and a Ptolemy. However, Noah Hacham emphasized that Piotrkowski's arguments were weak and unconvincing and refuted almost all of them.

Other works of possible Oniad authorship include the Testament of Job, 2 Enoch, Ezekiel the Tragedian (Exagoge), and the "Tale of the Tobiads."

== Military service ==
Many of the Jewish settlers in the Land of Onias were military colonists who served in the army of the Ptolemeid kings. Ananias and Chelkias, the sons of Onias IV, both served as generals in the army of Cleopatra III (r.117–81 BCE).

== See also ==
- History of the Jews in Egypt
- Jewish Temple at Elephantine
