= Gemma Sena Chiesa =

Italian archaeologist (1929–2024)

- Born: 1929
- Died: 21 July 2024 (aged 95)
- Occupation: Archaeologist

Gemma Sena Chiesa (1929 – 21 July 2024) was an Italian archaeologist who was world renowned for her work on the excavations at Calvatone. As an archaeologist she was known as "Godmother of Bedriacum" for her work leading the first excavation campaign in Calvatone. She spent her whole career at the University of Milan, where she was professor emeritus of Classical Archaeology. She was also author of many publications and important exhibitions.

== Biography ==
Chiesa was born in 1929. In 1952 she graduated from the University of Milan in Classical Literature. She wrote her thesis on the funerary steles of Aquileia, with Mario Attilio Levi. She spent her whole career at the University of Milan, where she was professor emeritus of Classical Archaeology. She was also author of many publications and important exhibitions.

Chiesa's main archaeological interest was the Romanization in Northern Italy and the Cisalpine Empire. In the late 1960s she was part of the excavations at Luni, directed by Antonio Frova, and directed the exploration of the vicus on Lake Maggiore at Angera from 1978 to 1987. Between 1989 and 2004 she directed the excavations at Calvatone-Bedriacum in the Po Valley. Chiesa was known as the "Godmother of Bedriacum" for her work leading the first excavation campaign in Calvatone.

Chiesa published many papers, and also created a number of exhibitions, including the 1996 I tesoro della via Postumia, which showed the first results from the Calvatone explorations.

Chiese was a founder of the University Council for World Archaeology, of which she was president from 1996 to 2002.

Chiesa died on 21 July 2024, aged 95 years.
