= Battle of Bedriacum =

Battles of the Year of the Four Emperors

Coordinates: 45.09°N 10.14°E

The Battle of Bedriacum refers to two battles fought during the Year of the Four Emperors (AD 69) near the village of Bedriacum (now Calvatone), about 35 kilometers (22 mi) from the town of Cremona in northern Italy. The fighting in fact took place between Bedriacum and Cremona, and the battles are sometimes called "First Cremona" and "Second Cremona".

== First Battle of Bedriacum ==
First Battle of Bedriacum
- Part of the Year of the Four Emperors
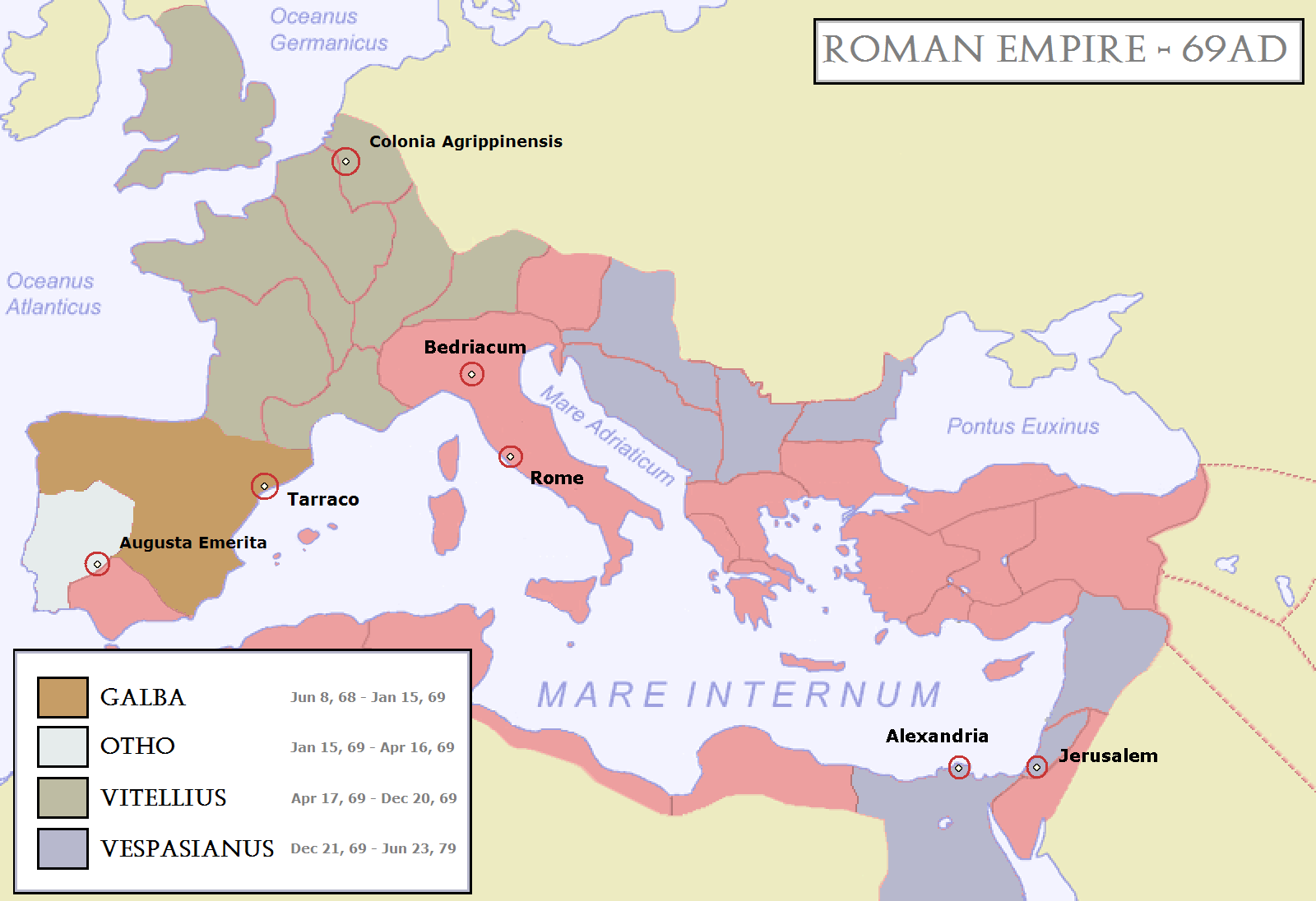
- The Roman Empire, AD 69. After the death of Nero, four influential generals successively vied for the imperial throne.
Date	14 April 69
Location	Near Bedriacum
Result	Victory for Vitellius

Belligerents
Supporters of Otho	Supporters of Vitellius

Commanders and leaders
Marcus Otho †; Gaius Suetonius Paulinus; Lucius Salvius Otho Titianus	Aulus Vitellius; Aulus Caecina Alienus; Fabius Valens

Units involved
Legio I Adiutrix; Legio XIII Gemina	Legio XXI Rapax; Legio V Alaudae

Casualties and losses
- 40,000 killed

Marcus Salvius Otho, with the Praetorian Guard, had his predecessor Galba murdered in January and claimed the throne. Legate Aulus Vitellius, governor of the province of Germania Inferior, had also claimed the throne earlier in the month and marched on Rome with his troops. Vitellius' forces were divided into two armies, one commanded by Aulus Caecina Alienus and the other by Fabius Valens. The Vitellian forces included legions XXI Rapax, V Alaudae, and powerful vexillationes from all the other legions stationed on the Rhine, together with a strong force of Batavian auxiliaries, totalling a force of around 70,000 men. The forces commanded by Caecina crossed the Alps by the Great St. Bernard Pass to reach northern Italy. They attacked Placentia but were repulsed by the Othonian garrison and fell back on Cremona to await the arrival of Valens' army.

Otho left Rome on March 14 and marched north to meet the challenge, leaving his brother Titianus in charge of Rome. He made his base at Brixellum. His forces included legions I Adiutrix, XIII Gemina, a forward detachment of XIV Gemina, the Praetorian Guard, and a force of gladiators. His general staff included generals such as Gaius Suetonius Paulinus, who, as governor of Britain, had defeated Boudica eight years before but Otho decided to call his brother Titianus from Rome to act as his commander in chief.

Before Titianus arrived, one engagement had already been fought. Caecina tried to set an ambush at Locus Castorum, a village about halfway between Bedriacum and Cremona on the Via Postumia. The Othonians were warned and their army marched for Locus Castorum, led by Suetonius Paulinus. The Othonians had the better of the fighting and Caecina's troops retreated to Cremona. Here they were joined by Valens' army, which had followed a longer route through Gaul.

Titanius had now joined the Othonian armies and took command. It was decided to march on Cremona to give battle, against the advice of Paulinus and other generals, who wished to wait until other legions had arrived. Otho remained at Brixellum to await the outcome. On 14 April the two armies met on the Via Postumia, nearer Cremona than Bedriacum, with the Othonian troops already tired after a long march. Some of the heaviest fighting was where Otho's I Adiutrix legion, recently raised from the marines of Classis Ravennas at Ravenna, clashed with Vitellius' veteran Rapax. The Adiutrix acquitted itself well, capturing the eagle of the 21st, though its commanding officer was killed as the 21st strove to recover it. Elsewhere on the battlefield, Otho's 13th Legion was defeated by Vitellius' Alaudae and the Adiutrix eventually gave way when a force of Batavian auxiliaries took them in the flank. According to Dio Cassius, about 40,000 men were killed in the fighting. The Othonian troops fled back to their camp in Bedriacum and the next day surrendered to the Vitellian forces and took the oath of allegiance to Vitellius.

When news of the defeat was brought to Brixellum, many of Otho's troops urged him to fight on, pointing out that more troops were on the way, but Otho chose suicide rather than cause more deaths. He had been emperor for fewer than three months; Vitellius continued his march on Rome, where he made a triumphal entry and was recognized as emperor by the Senate.

== Second Battle of Bedriacum ==
Second Battle of Bedriacum
- Part of the Year of the Four Emperors
Date	24 October 69
Location	Near Bedriacum
Result	Victory for Vespasian

Belligerents
Supporters of Vespasian	Supporters of Vitellius

Commanders and leaders
Mucianus; Marcus Antonius Primus	Vitellius; Aulus Caecina Alienus

Units involved
Legio III Gallica; Legio VIII Augusta; Legio VII Claudia; Legio VII Galbiana; Legio XIII Gemina	Legio XXI Rapax; Legio V Alaudae; Legio I Italica; Legio XXII Primigenia; Legio IV Macedonica

Strength
25,600 Legionaries (Note: An unknown number of cavalry)	25,600 Legionaries

The legions in the Middle East provinces of Judaea and Syria had acclaimed Vespasian as emperor. Vespasian had been given a special command in Judaea by Nero in 67 with the task of putting down the First Jewish–Roman War. He gained the support of the governor of Syria, Gaius Licinius Mucianus and a strong force drawn from the Judaean and Syrian legions marched on Rome under the command of Mucianus.

Before the eastern legions could reach Rome, the Danubian legions of the provinces of Raetia and Moesia also acclaimed Vespasian as emperor in August. Three of these legions, III Gallica, VIII Augusta, and VII Claudia had been on their way to support Otho when they heard of his defeat at the first battle of Bedriacum. They had been made to swear allegiance to Vitellius, but when they heard of Vespasian's bid for power they switched their support to him. They persuaded the other two legions, VII Galbiana and XIII Gemina to join them, which the XIII Gemina did all the more readily as they were one of the legions which had been defeated at First Bedriacum, and had been made to build amphitheatres for Valens and Caecina as punishment. Led by the commanding officer of the VII Galbiana, Marcus Antonius Primus, they marched on Rome, and having a shorter distance to march reached Italy before Mucianus' troops.

When Vitellius heard of Antonius' approach, he dispatched Caecina with a powerful army composed of XXI Rapax, V Alaudae, I Italica, and XXII Primigenia together with detachments from seven other legions and a force of auxiliaries. The first of Antonius' legions had arrived at Verona but though urged to attack them before the remainder of the army arrived, Caecina declined to do so. Caecina had been plotting with Sextus Lucilius Bassus, commander of the Classis Ravennas, the Roman fleet at Ravenna, to switch their support to Vespasian. His troops refused to follow his lead however and put him in chains. Valens, who had been delayed by illness, had by now set out from Rome.

Caecina's army, now without their general, advanced on Cremona. Antonius was now at Bedriacum, and advanced towards Cremona with a force of cavalry. They encountered the vanguard of the Vitellian army between Bedriacum and Cremona on 24 October and a battle followed, with Antonius sending back to Bedriacum for the legions. Antonius' troops had the better of the fighting, and the Vitellian troops retreated to their camp outside Cremona.

Antonius' forces advanced along the Via Postumia towards Cremona. They were opposed by a powerful Vitellian army, who had been reinforced by other legions including Legion IV Macedonica, but were still without a commander as Valens had not yet arrived. By now night had fallen and the battle continued through the hours of darkness. The VII Galbiana, Antonius' legion, suffered heavy casualties and lost its eagle for a while, though one of its centurions later sacrificed his own life to win it back. Eventually Antonius' forces began to gain the upper hand, and the turning point came when dawn broke. Antonius' III Gallica had served in Syria for many years and while there had adopted a local custom. As the sun rose, they saluted it with cheers; this was misinterpreted by the Vitellian forces, who thought that they were greeting reinforcements from the east and lost heart. The Vitellian forces were driven back into their camp, which was taken by Antonius' forces. Antonius then attacked Cremona, which surrendered. Cremona was sacked and then burned by the victorious troops over four days; many residents were raped, murdered and robbed. Antonius was embarrassed by the episode and forbade the keeping of Cremonans as slaves, resulting in many being murdered by their captors to evade punishment.

Antonius continued to Rome, where Vitellius was taken prisoner and shortly afterwards killed. The way was thus cleared for Vespasian to ascend the throne near the end of this bloody year of crisis.

== Other sources ==
- The Encyclopedia of Military History: From 3500 B.C. to the Present. (2nd Revised Edition 1986), R. Ernest Dupuy and Trevor N. Dupuy. pp. 127–128
- P.A.L. Greenhalgh The Year of the Four Emperors (Weidenfeld and Nicolson,1975)
- Michael Grant The Twelve Caesars (Weidenfeld and Nicolson,1975)
