= Gaius Valerius Paullinus =

Gaius Valerius Paullinus was a Roman senator, who was active during the reign of Trajan. He is best known as a friend of Pliny the Younger, having received a number of letters from Pliny. Paullinus was suffect consul in the nundinium of September to December 107 as the colleague of Gaius Julius Longinus.

Ronald Syme has strongly suggested that Paullinus is the son of the identically named Gaius Valerius Paulinus, procurator of Gallia Narbonensis. Paullinus opposed Fabius Valens when the latter raided Gaul during the Year of the Four Emperors.

Except for being suffect consul, Paullinus' career is otherwise unknown. Because there are a number of lacunae in the records of known proconsulships and imperial appointments, one cannot assume he did not hold any.

== Paullinus and Pliny ==
Paullinus has been identified as the recipient of five surviving letters from Pliny the Younger and mentioned in a sixth, as well as being the subject of an exchange of letters between Pliny and the emperor Trajan. Although they do not provide a biographical narrative for Paullinus, they give some sense of Pliny's relationship with the man.

The first to appear in Pliny's collected letters provides little information, containing only a gentle rebuke to Paullinus for not writing more often to Pliny. In one letter in book four, which he wrote to his friend Cornelius Ursus about the trial of Julius Bassus, Pliny mentions Paullinus as making a motion in the trial, by which Paullinus gained "a reputation for fair dealing and integrity." In another letter in the same book addressed to Paullinus, he describes how "a young man of some distinction" remained to listen to Pliny's speech in the Centumviral court, despite having his tunic torn and Pliny's speech lasting seven hours. Another letter to Paullinus begins with complimenting him on how humanely he treats the members of his household, then asks him to allow a freedman of Pliny, named Zosimus, to convalesce at Paullinus' villa at Forum Julii. A fourth letter is a fluffy essay on the life of an aristocrat. The fifth is an apology that Pliny would be unable to attend Paullinus' inauguration as suffect consul because he had to attend to negotiating the rents of a number of his tenants on one of his estates.

While Pliny was serving as procurator in Bithynia et Pontus, reviewing the finances of that Senatorial province at Trajan's request, he wrote the emperor for a favor involving Paullinus. That man had died and appointed Pliny executor of his estate. In his will, Paullinus had asked that some of his freedmen, who had been informally emancipated, and thus were Junian Latins, be granted full citizenship on his death. Pliny requested citizenship for only three of them (C. Valerius Astraeus, C. Valerius Dionysius, and C. Valerius Asper), worried he might "be going too far" to ask this grant for all of them; Trajan replies that not only he does grant this in their case, but "I intend to do the same in the case of the rest for whom you request it."

These letters between Pliny and Trajan provide us a date for Valerius Paullinus' death, around AD 112.

Political offices
Preceded by Gaius Minicius Fundanus, and Gaius Vettennius Severus as suffect consuls	Suffect consul of the Roman Empire; 107 with Gaius Julius Longinus	Succeeded by Appius Annius Trebonius Gallus, and Marcus Atilius Bradua as ordinary consuls
