= Gaius Quinctius Atticus =

1st-century CE Roman consul

Gaius Quinctius Atticus was a politician and nobleman of ancient Rome. He lived in the 1st century CE. With Gnaeus Caecilius Simplex, he was appointed consul suffectus by the Roman emperor Otho in November, 69 CE.

During the Year of the Four Emperors, he declared in favor of Vespasian, likely as much because of an antipathy toward Vitellius as because he expected reward from Vespasian. He distributed pro-Flavian propaganda, and with the other partisans of Vespasian seized the Area Capitolina. Here they were attacked by the soldiers of Vitellius; the Capitol was set ablaze, and Atticus, with most of the other leaders of his party, taken prisoner.

Atticus was not put to death by Vitellius; and probably in order to obtain the pardon of the emperor, he admitted (perhaps falsely) that he had set fire to the Capitol, as Vitellius was anxious that his party should not bear the odium of executing a prominent citizen like Atticus.

Political offices
Preceded by Fabius Valens, and Rosius Regulus	Consul of the Roman Empire; 69 with Gnaeus Caecilius Simplex	Succeeded by Vespasian II, and Titus
