= Gaius Valerius Paulinus (eques) =

1st century AD Roman eques, procurator and governor of Egypt

Governor of Roman Egypt
- In office AD 74 – AD 74
- Preceded by: Lucius Peducaeus Colo(nus?)
- Succeeded by: [S]ept[imius?] Nu[...]

Personal details
- Born: c. AD 1st century Roman Empire
- Died: c. AD 74; Roman Empire
- Occupation: Ancient Roman politician

Gaius Valerius Paulinus was a Roman eques who flourished during the reign of the emperors Nero, and Vespasian. He was appointed to a series of imperial offices, including praefectus or governor of Roman Egypt. Ronald Syme has strongly suggested that Paulinus is the father of the identically named Gaius Valerius Paullinus, suffect consul in 107.

Valerius Paulinus first appears in history during the Year of Four Emperors while procurator or overseer of the imperial properties in Gallia Narbonensis. As Tacitus tells us, following the defeat of the Othonian forces in the Battle of Bedriacum, Fabius Valens left Italy by ship to raise troops in Gaul. He put in at Hercules Monoecus (modern Monaco) where he learned Paulinus, who was a friend of Vespasian, was blocking his path inland. Valens sailed on, but was cast up by a storm on the Stoechades (modern Iles d'Hyeres, near Toulon). Here he was caught by surprise by some galleys sent after him by Paulinus, and captured. Paulinus sent him back to Italy, where he was executed.

When Vespasian emerged as the victor in this civil war, Paulinus was rewarded for his loyalty. He was first appointed Praefectus annonae, or overseer of the grain supply of Rome. From this position, Vespasian promoted him to prefect of Roman Egypt after Tiberius Julius Lupus died in office; Guido Bastianini dates his tenure to 74.

At this point Valerius Paulinus abruptly vanishes from history. It is possible he too died in office, or shortly after leaving it.

Political offices
Preceded by Tiberius Julius Lupus	Prefectus of Aegyptus; 74	Succeeded by [S]ept[imius?] Nu[...]
