= Quintus Julius Cordus =

1st century Roman politician, suffect consul and governor

Quintus Julius Cordus was a Roman senator of the early Roman Empire, whose known career flourished under the reign of Vespasian. He was suffect consul in the nundinium of November-December AD 71 as the colleague of Gnaeus Pompeius Collega.

Cordus is known to have been governor of two provinces. The first one was the public province of Roman Cyprus, where an inscription records how he supervised the reconstruction of the theatre of Kourion after it was damaged in an earthquake. This inscription allows us to date his tenure to the year 65. The second province was Gallia Aquitania during the Year of Four Emperors, or AD 69. Despite its leading inhabitants taking an oath of allegiance to Otho, the province shifted its loyalty to the rival emperor Vitellius.

His life after he stepped down from the consulate is a blank.

Political offices
Preceded by Lucius Flavius Fimbria, and Gaius Atilius Barbarus as suffect consuls	Suffect consul of the Roman Empire; 71 with Gnaeus Pompeius Collega	Succeeded by Imp. Caesar Vespasianus Augustus IV, and Titus Caesar Vespasianus II as ordinary consuls
