= Gnaeus Caecilius Simplex =

1st century AD Roman senator

Gnaeus Caecilius Simplex was a Roman senator, who was active during the middle of the first century AD. The ephemeral emperor Vitellius appointed him consul during the Year of Four Emperors with Gaius Quinctius Atticus as his colleague, replacing Martius Macer and Quinctius Atticus. Many believed Simplex had bribed Vitellius to be appointed to this magistracy, and he was accused of this in the Senate; however Vitellius defended Simplex, and "afterwards bestowed on Simplex a consulship that had not been bought with crime or money."

His first known office was as proconsular governor of Sardinia, which at the time was a public province; he held this office in the term 67/68. During his consulate in the last two months of the year 69, Simplex is recorded for two acts. The first was being in charge of recording the names of volunteers wanting to join Vitellius' army against the forces of Vespasian. The second, on the morning of 18 December of the same year, was to refuse to accept Vitellius' dagger when he attempted to give it away as a form of resigning the office of emperor.

An inscription from Musti in Tunisia published in 2009 provides additional information about Simplex. One is that Simplex was proconsular governor of Africa, most likely in the late 80s. The second is it provides not only his praenomen Gnaeus, but a second and previously unknown gentilicum, Pinarius. There are two other senators who bear the nomina "Gnaeus Pinarius": Gnaeus Pinarius Cornelius Clemens, suffect consul in either 71 or 72, and Gnaeus Pinarius Aemilius Cicatricula, suffect consul in 72. This led Olli Salomies to conclude "the most economical explanation for the existence of the three contemporary Cn. Pinarii would be to postulate an otherwise unknown Cn. Pinarius, probably a man of means but perhaps without an offspring, who could have adopted by testament three promising younger senators."

Political offices
Preceded by Fabius Valens, and Rosius Regulus	Consul of the Roman Empire; 69 with Gaius Quinctius Atticus	Succeeded by Vespasian II, and Titus
