= Tiberius Julius Lupus =

Roman state official

Governor of Roman Egypt
- In office AD 71 – AD 73
- Preceded by: Lucius Peducaeus Colo(nus?)
- Succeeded by: Gaius Valerius Paulinus

Personal details
- Born: c. AD 1st century Roman Empire
- Died: c. AD 73; Roman Empire
- Occupation: Ancient Roman politician

Tiberius Julius Lupus (died AD 73) was a member of the equestrian class who was praefectus or governor of Roman Egypt from 71 to 73. He was the older brother of Lucius Julius Ursus; their father was Julius Lupus, the brother-in-law of the praetorian prefect Marcus Arrecinus Clemens and uncle of Arrecina Tertulla, the wife of the emperor Titus. It was this connection that likely enabled Lupus to be appointed to the governorship.

While governor of Egypt, Lupus is attested as hearing the Colossi of Memnon sing, one of many ancient Romans known to have witnessed this phenomenon. A damaged collection of legal decisions records that Lupus had presided over a case involving an inheritance.

After the fall of Masada, according to Josephus, members of a militant Jewish sect known as the Sicarii managed to escape destruction in the First Jewish–Roman War and some took refuge in Alexandria. At first these survivors lived quietly in the city, but after a time they quarreled with their coreligionists, and the two groups fell to fighting each other. Lupus reported this disturbance to the emperor Vespasian, who ordered Lupus to close the Jewish temple of Onias in Leontopolis. Lupus died in office not much later; P. J. Sijpesteijn argues that Julius Lupus died in Autumn 73.

His successor Gaius Valerius Paulinus ordered the temple destroyed.

Political offices
Preceded by Lucius Peducaeus Colo(nus?)	Prefect of Egypt; 71–73	Succeeded by Gaius Valerius Paulinus
