= Gnaeus Pompeius Collega =

1st century Roman senator, consul and legate

Gnaeus Pompeius Collega was a Roman senator who held a series of offices in the emperor's service. He was suffect consul in the nundinium of November to December 71 with Quintus Julius Cordus as his colleague. Collega's best known action was investigating the cause of a fire in Antioch during his interim governorship of Syria.

Collega's cursus honorum is only partially known. He was legatus legionis or commander of Legio IV Scythica, stationed in Syria in the year 70. The newly appointed governor, Lucius Junius Caesennius Paetus, had not yet arrived, and as senior military officer Collega was acting governor. During this time a fire erupted in Antioch, according to the historian Josephus, which burned down the market-place and the adjacent civic buildings and law courts. The local Jewish community was blamed for this conflagration, and the citizens of Antioch set upon attacking them. Only with much difficulty was Collega able to restrain the rioters, and set about determining who was guilty of starting the fire. He discovered that not only were the Jews innocent of this crime, but it was "the work of some scoundrels, who, under the pressure of debts, imagined that if they burnt the market-place and the public records they would be rid of all demands." It is likely that this successful action led to his appointment as consul the following year.

Collega's other known office was governor of the imperial province of Cappadocia and Galatia, where two different inscriptions attest to his administration. One is a milepost. The other is a dedication in Antioch of Pisidia celebrating his patronage of the city. Werner Eck dates his tenure in that province from the year 73 to 77.

Gnaeus Pompeius Collega has been identified as the father of the ordinary consul of 93, Sextus Pompeius Collega.

Political offices
Preceded by Lucius Flavius Fimbria, and Gaius Atilius Barbarus as Suffect consuls	Suffect consul of the Roman Empire; AD 71 with Quintus Julius Cordus	Succeeded by Imp. Caesar Vespasianus Augustus IV, and Titus Caesar Vespasianus II as ordinary consuls
