= Locus Castorum =

Ancient Village in Italy

Locus Castorum was an ancient village of the Roman Empire era located in northern Italy approximately 12 miles (19 km) from Cremona, and midway between Cremona and Bedriacum. Its name derives from the Gemini twins, or Castor and Pollux. It was the site of the Battle of Locus Castorum.
