= Ananias ben Onias =

Son of Jewish high priest

Ananias the son of Onias (in Hebrew, Hananiya ben Honiyyahu) was the son of the Jewish high priest, Onias IV, who founded a Jewish Temple at Leontopolis in Egypt during the persecutions of Antiochus IV.

Onias won the favor of Ptolemy VI, who gave permission for the building of this temple. Ananias and his brother Helkias were held in high esteem by Cleopatra III. Owing to her regard for them, the Judeans of the province Oneion, between Pelusium and Memphis, remained true to her when she was abandoned on the island of Cyprus by all her soldiers. When she went to Judea to help the Hasmonean king Alexander Jannaeus against her son, Ptolemy Lathyrus, and succeeded in dislodging him (about 100 BCE), Ananias and Helkias were her generals; and Ananias dissuaded her from incorporating Judea as an Egyptian province, at the same time inducing her to form an alliance with Alexander Jannaeus.
