= Battle of Locus Castorum =

Battle between the forces of rival Roman emperors Otho and Vitellius (69 AD)

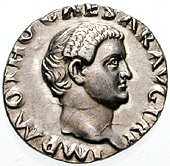
OthoDen

The Battle of Locus Castorum took place during the Year of the Four Emperors between the armies of the rival Roman Emperors Otho and Vitellius. Locus Castorum was a village that existed in the 1st century Roman Empire roughly 15 kilometers from Cremona. It was also referred to as "the Castors" and "at Castor's." The village may have been the location of a temple to the Gemini twins, Castor and Pollux.

The forces of Otho met the forces of Vitellius there. It was one of three early victories for Otho (the first being in the Alps and the second being near Placentia), but Vitellius was eventually the victor at Betriacum.

Locus Castorum is mentioned in Suetonius The Lives of Twelve Caesars Life of Otho, 9 and Tacitus Histories II.24
