= Aulus Caecina Alienus =

1st century AD Roman general

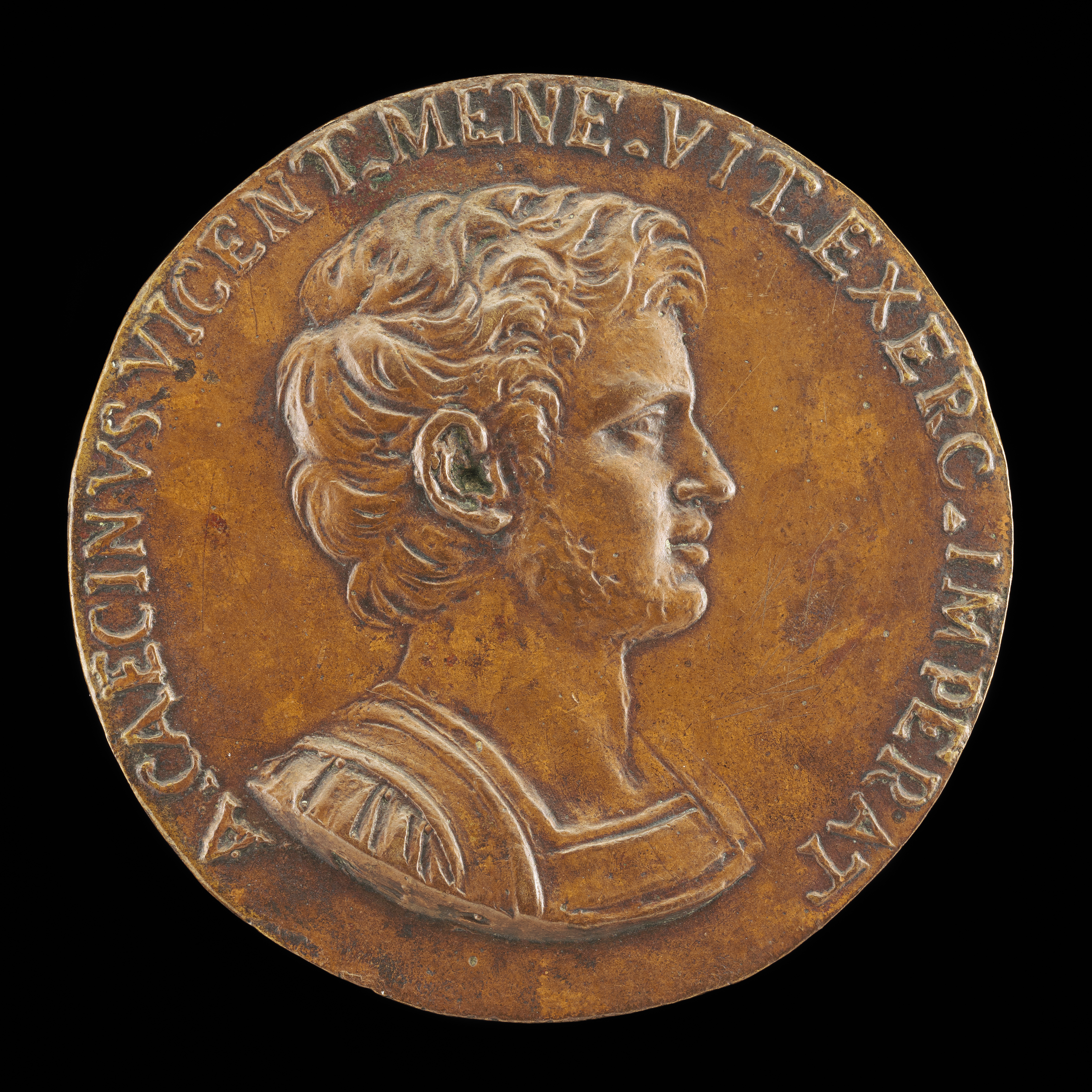
- Born: 40 AD; Vicetia, Italy, Roman Empire
- Died: 79 AD (aged 39); Rome, Italy, Roman Empire
- Title: General, Consul

Aulus Caecina Alienus (c. 40 AD – c. 79 AD) was a Roman general active during the Year of the Four Emperors.

== Biography ==
Caecina was born in Vicetia (modern Vicenza) around 40 A.D. He was quaestor of Hispania Baetica (southern Iberia) in 68 A.D. On the death of Nero, he attached himself to Galba, who appointed him to the command of Legio IV Macedonica at Mogontiacum in Germania Superior (Upper Germany). In 68 A.D, as quaestor, his job was to control the public monies of the senatorial province of Baetica. Before the end of 68 AD, Galba was informed that Caecina had diverted funds into his own pocket. After a trial, Galba convicted him for misappropriation of funds.

Having been prosecuted for embezzling public money, Caecina went over to Vitellius, who sent him across the Swiss Plateau with troops from Germania Superior. During this campaign, as recorded by Tacitus, he pillaged Aquae Helveticae after engagements between the Legio XXI Rapax and the Helvetii, and later defeated the Helvetii under Claudius Severus at Bözberg. Vitellius then sent him with a large army into Italy. Caecina crossed the Alps through the Great St. Bernard Pass, but was defeated near Cremona by Suetonius Paulinus, the chief general of Otho. Subsequently, in conjunction with Fabius Valens, Caecina defeated Otho at the decisive First Battle of Bedriacum.

The incapacity of Vitellius tempted Vespasian to take up arms against him. Caecina, who had been entrusted with the repression of the revolt, turned traitor, and tried to persuade his army to go over to Vespasian, but was thrown into chains by the soldiers. After the overthrow of Vitellius, he was released, and taken into favor by the new emperor. In 79 A.D he was implicated, along with Eprius Marcellus, in a conspiracy against Vespasian, and was executed in Rome by order of Vespasian's son Titus. It was said that Caecina was planning to overthrow the Flavians by inciting the troops. Titus had discovered a speech written in Caecina’s own hand that he intended to read to the soldiers to execute his plan.

Tacitus described Caecina as a man of handsome presence and boundless ambition, a gifted orator and a great favourite with the soldiers.

== See also ==
- Caecinia gens
- Aliena gens

Political offices
Preceded by Gnaeus Arrius Antoninus, and Aulus Marius Celsus	Suffect consul of the Roman Empire; 69 with Fabius Valens	Succeeded by Rosius Regulus
