= Fabius Valens =

1st century AD Roman military commander

Fabius Valens of Anagnia (died 69) was a Roman commander favoured by Nero, and a participant in the civil wars of the Year of the Four Emperors.

Valens came from an equestrian family in the city of Anagnia. In 69 he was suffect consul, and commander of Legio I Germanica based in Germania Inferior. When the troops refused to endorse the new emperor Galba after Nero's death, he had them proclaim Vitellius, the governor of Germania Inferior, as emperor. The forces supporting Vitellius were divided into two armies for the march on Rome, one of them commanded by Valens, the other by Aulus Caecina Alienus. Valens' troops took a route through Gaul, probably to recruit additional soldiers, eventually joining with the Vitellian army led by Caecina at Cremona. By then Galba had been killed and Otho had been proclaimed emperor at Rome. Otho's forces met the combined Vitellian armies at the first Battle of Bedriacum. Valens and Caecina won a decisive victory, and Otho committed suicide when he heard the news of his army's defeat, allowing Vitellius to make a triumphant entry into Rome.

However, the armies in the east had proclaimed Vespasian as emperor, and two armies supporting Vespasian marched on Rome. The first to reach Italy was composed of five legions from Pannonia and Moesia, commanded by Antonius Primus. Valens was ill at the time, so that the force that Vitellius despatched from Rome to counter this threat was commanded by Caecina. Caecina tried to betray Vitellius and proclaim Vespasian as emperor, but his army refused to follow his lead, and put him in chains. By this time Valens had recovered from his illness and was on his way to join the army, but before he could reach his men, the Vitellian forces had been defeated by Antonius at the second Battle of Bedriacum.

Valens tried to continue the struggle, and departed by ship from Pisa for Gaul to try to raise new troops. He put in at Hercules Monoecus (modern Monaco) but was advised not to try to march inland as a procurator named Gaius Valerius Paulinus had raised a strong force from former members of Otho's Praetorian Guard. These had been dismissed from the service after Vitellius' victory, but were only too ready to re-enlist to support Vitellius' rival. Valens therefore sailed on, and was cast up by a storm on the Stoechades (modern Iles d'Hyeres, near Toulon). Here he was caught by surprise by some galleys sent after him by Valerius Paulinus, and captured. Paulinus sent him back to Italy, where he was executed at Urvinum (modern Urbino). His head was taken to Narni to be shown to the Vitellian troops who were still resisting there in hope that Valens would return with reinforcements. The sight of Valens' head was enough to persuade them to surrender.

One anecdote says that he appeared on the music-stage hall at Nero's coming of age celebrations, not at the command of Nero but voluntarily. At the time this was frowned upon, and many people thought that he was merely a man of fashion. Valens was an undisciplined character but not without talent; he tried to portray himself as witty by behaving frivolously.

Political offices
Preceded by Gnaeus Arrius Antoninus, and Aulus Marius Celsus	Suffect consul of the Roman Empire; 69 with Aulus Caecina Alienus; Rosius Regulus	Succeeded by Gnaeus Caecilius Simplex, and Gaius Quinctius Atticus
