= Calvatone =

Calvatone Calvatòon (Lombard)
- Comune
- Comune di Calvatone
- Coat of arms

- Location within Italy Location within Lombardy
- Coordinates: 45°7′43″N 10°26′30″E
- Country: Italy
- Region: Lombardy
- Province: Cremona (CR)

Government
  - Mayor: Pier Ugo Piccinelli

Area
  - Total: 13.7 km^{2} (5.3 sq mi)

Population (28 February 2017)
  - Total: 1,207
  - Density: 88.1/km^{2} (228/sq mi)
- Demonym: Calvatonesi
- Time zone: UTC+1 (CET)
  - Summer (DST): UTC+2 (CEST)
- Postal code: 26030
- Dialing code: 0375
- Patron saint: St. Blaise
- Saint day: 10 August
- Website: Official website

Calvatone (Lombard: Calvatòon) is a comune (municipality) in the Province of Cremona, Lombardy, located about 110 kilometres (68 mi) southeast of Milan and about 35 kilometres (22 mi) east of Cremona. Its territory is crossed by the Oglio River. In Roman times it was known as Bedriacum.

== History ==
In the time of the Roman Empire, there was a vicus in the approximate area of Calvatone, called Bedriacum. During the Year of the Four Emperors in 69 AD, there were two Battles of Bedriacum, both decisive conflicts. The first ended in the death of Otho, who killed himself in order to halt the bloodshed, and the second in the defeat and execution of Vitellius.

The coat of arms and banner of the municipality of Calvatone were granted by Presidential Decree of 24 April 2000.
