= Roman theology of victory =

The Roman theology of victory also referred to as Jovian theology is a concept that considered victory as a legitimator of a political power or a claimant's divine right to rule. It is invoked to support a political authority in the case of the failure or absence of traditional institutions.

== Origin ==
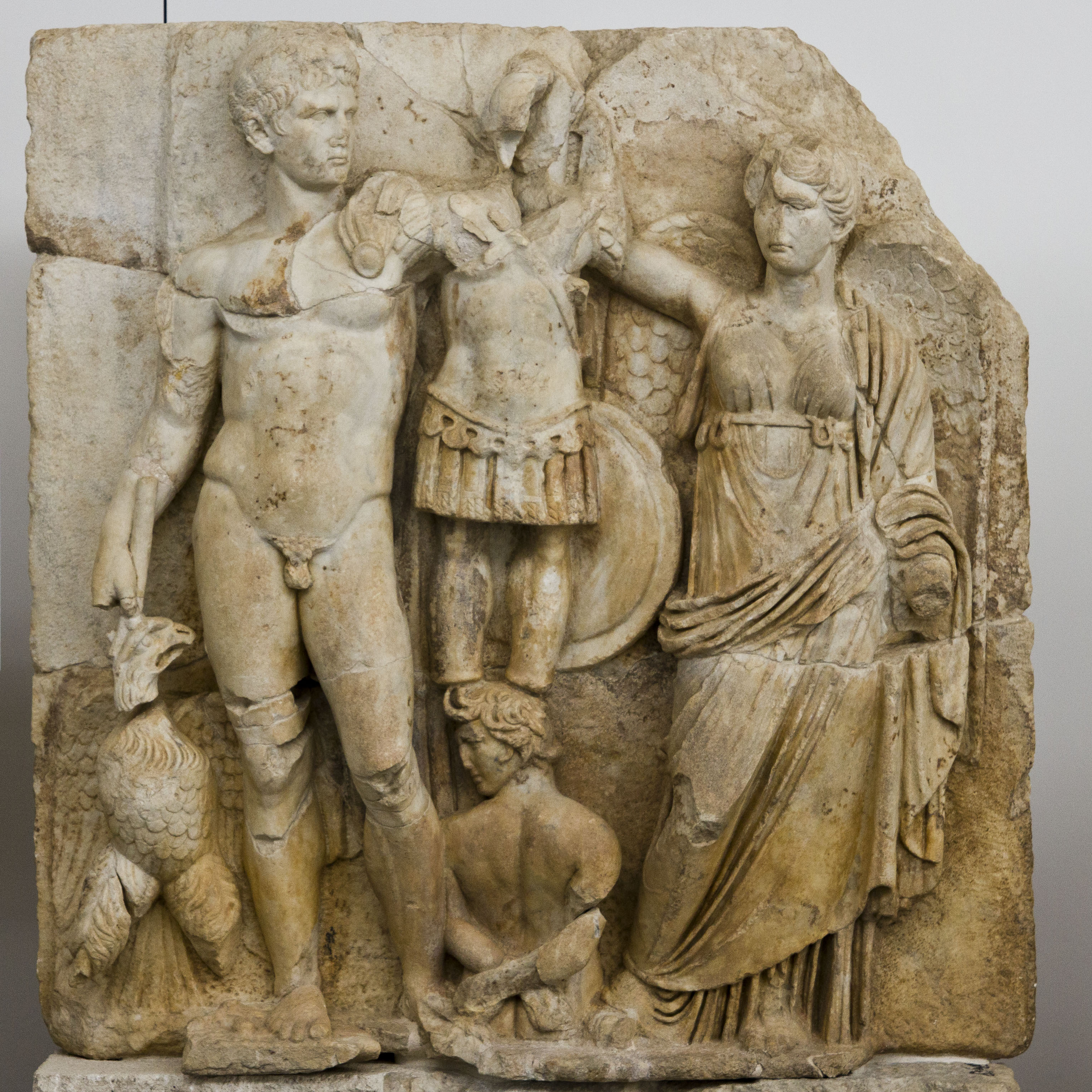
Augustus standing with Victory

According to J. Rufus Fears, the theology of victory originated in the ancient Mediterranean world. There are sources that specifically consider it of Graeco-Roman origin. It was fundamental, for instance, in establishing Hellenistic monarchs such as Alexander the Great.

The concept was inherited during the third century by the Romans, who modified the concept their own way. The theology of victory, thereafter, became associated with Rome with the way it was developed and embedded into the Roman imperial policy. Innovations were introduced beginning in Augustus' reign so that it was widely embraced by the time Commodus became the emperor.

In Rome, the logic of the concept emphasized how felicitas (good fortune or luck) is granted to the victor, who demonstrated virtus or courage, manliness, and aggression. During the republican period, this virtue was equivalent to human characteristics such as "bravery", "manliness", and "valor". When Rome eased into the Principate, however, the felicitas connoted divine gift and formed part of the imperial theology of victory. The idea is that earthly authority depended on heavenly accord. It was the basis of the view that pax Romana (peace of Rome) mirrored pax deum (peace of the gods).

== Theology ==
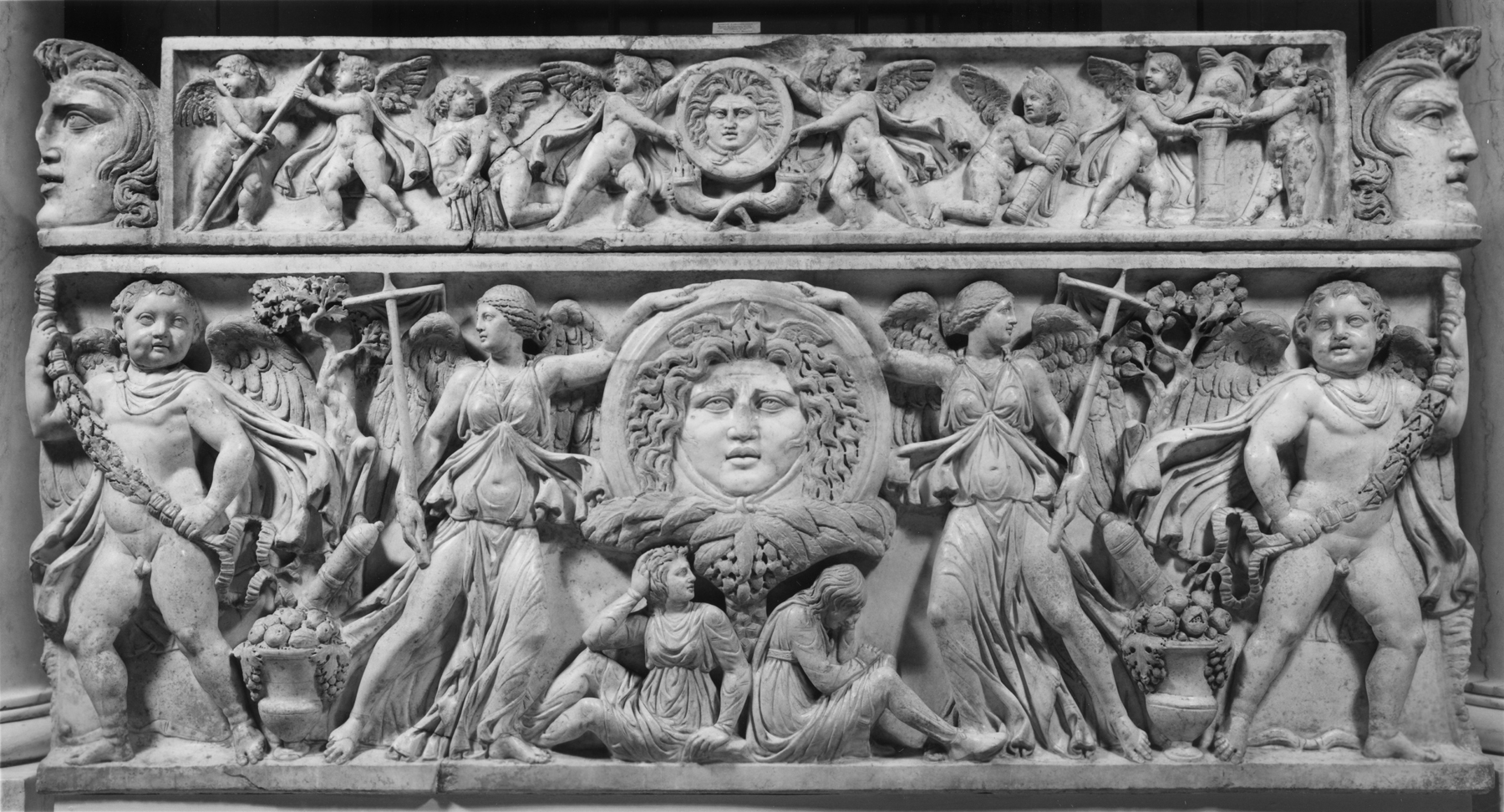
A typical depiction of Roman victory, showing two Victories holding standards in the battlefield.

The theology of victory was used to legitimize political power once the traditional ways of sanctioning political power failed. Its efficacy drew from divine foundation since victory was considered an epiphany of the goddess Victoria. It held that successful conquest indicated a projection of supernatural gifts, legitimizing both sovereignty and divine status.

The theology operates on the basis of felicitas. Gods granted this good fortune or luck to those who demonstrated virtus (the masculine virtue for courage, manliness, and aggression) in battle so that those who won in the conflict were perceived to have been granted excessive virtus. This meant that their victory manifested the god's choice of one potential ruling power or figure over another.

Jupiter was a key figure to the Roman theology of victory. He was associated with the "religio-magical aspects of warfare, battle, and victory". His authority was the basis of military prowess and articulated in the tradition that all victory stemmed from Jupiter's providence. Using this propaganda cemented that stature of new emperor's such as Diocletian, particularly, among a restive Roman military and in an empire fresh from a bruising civil conflict. Coins commemorating Domitian also represented him as Jupiter's vice-regent on earth. He was depicted being crowned by Victoria while holding Jupiter's thunderbolt in his right hand.

== Flavian propaganda ==
The Flavian dynasty's claim to power was linked to their victory in Judea. It is said that its founder Vespasian, who was from the plebeian class, used the theology of victory to legitimize his ascension to the Principate. He applied the theology by promoting his victory over the Jews. Aside from the records chronicling his campaign, his exploits were commemorated on victory arches as well as the Flavian Amphitheater. The propaganda communicated that the Roman gods were superior to the gods of the Jews and that Vespasian and his son earned the approval of the gods having been granted good fortune. This cemented that Flavian position due to the view that Rome ruled the world because god was on its side. The Flavians would reinforce this through the adoption of Christianity and the imperial policy of peaceful co-existence in the drive to get the Roman empire to be viewed as a benefactor of the world.

== Christianity ==
Some scholars cite the construction of Christian buildings and how subjects from the furthest reaches of the empire go to church as a testament and celebration of the triumph of the Roman empire. This appropriation and reformulation of the Roman theology of victory replaced the imprint of the emperor's boot on a subdued people's back with the embrace of religion as the measure of subjection. It is also referred to as the Byzantine theology of imperial victory. The imperial rule and Christianity intersected and was successful due to the alignment of their respective goals: the subjugation of barbarian nations and Jesus' command to evangelize nations.

== Criticism ==
Some scholars challenged the tenets of the theology of victory. There were Roman authors who cited that the theology favors the warlords, citing that their victory was not only over their enemy but also over their own people. It is argued that the unequaled felicitas is employed to legitimize the victors' infractions of the law and customs.
