= Falacrine =

Village of Ancient Rome

Coordinates: 42°35′37″N 13°10′14″E

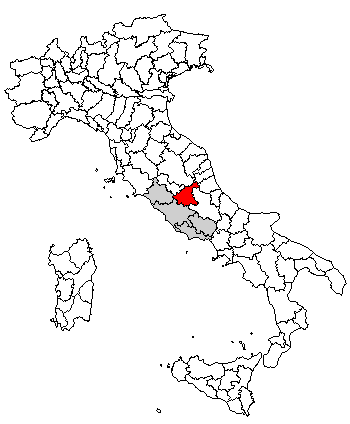
Location of the province of Rieti

Falacrine (Latin: Falacrīnum or vīcus Phalacrīnae; Italian: Falacrine) was a village of Ancient Rome that was the birthplace of the emperor Vespasian (9–79 AD).

== Location ==
The location of Falacrine has been the subject of debate. The village is described as lying just beyond Reate (modern Rieti), in the Sabine hill country northeast of Rome. According to local tradition before the 16th century, it was between Greccio and Contigliano. However, local historian Mariano Vittori believed that Falacrine lay near Cittareale, in the province of Rieti. Latini found ruins in Collicelle, a frazione of Cittareale that he thought were Falacrine. However, in Amatrice it's believed that Falacrine lies in the frazione of Torrita, above the valley of the same name. Others have suggested that it lies in Antrodoco, Rieti or Paganico Sabino.

In 2009, archaeologists unearthed a large 150,000 square feet (14,000 m^{2}) first-century villa near Cittareale that they identified as Falacrine.
