= Vespasian =

Roman emperor from AD 69 to 79

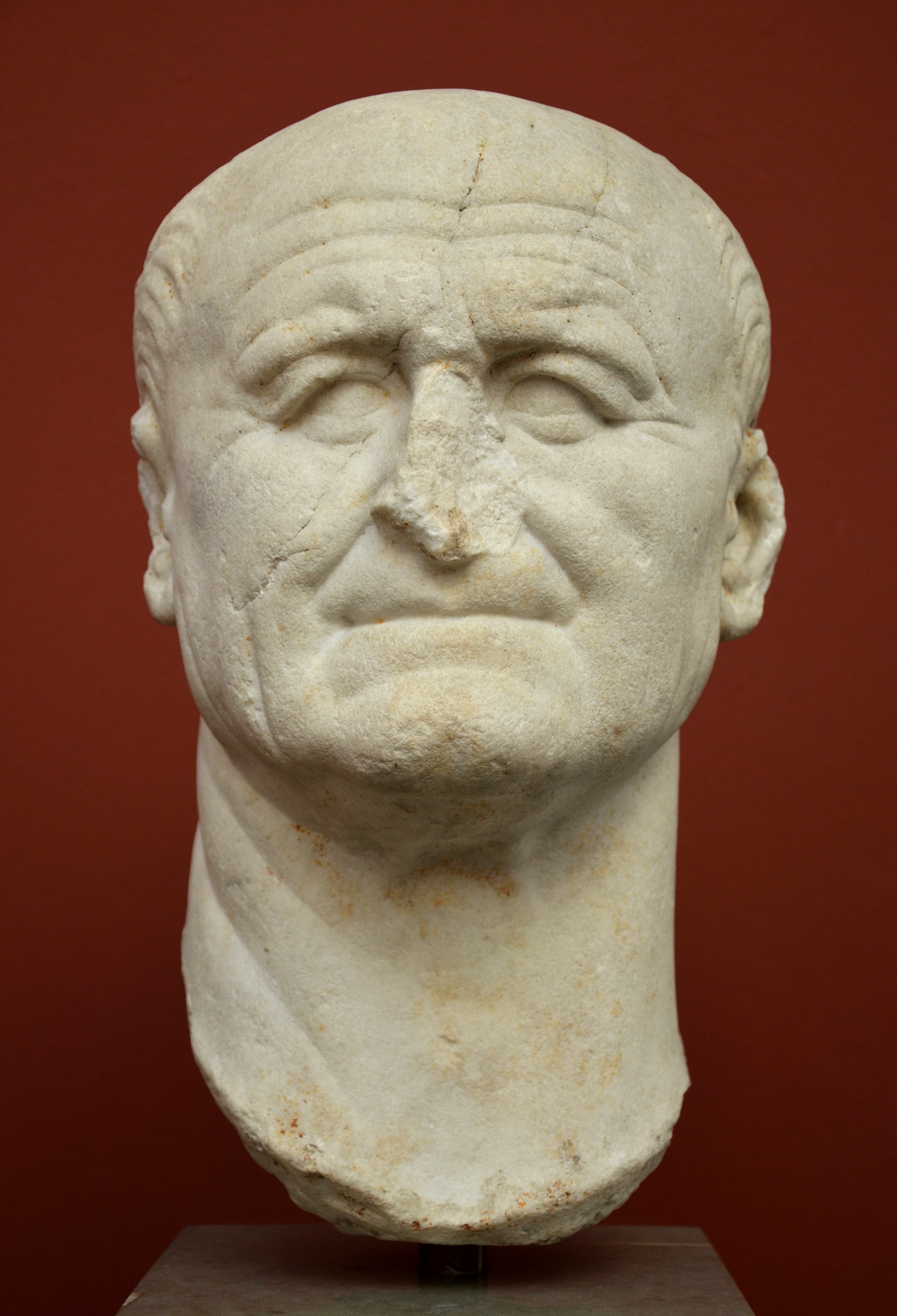
- Bust at the Ny Carlsberg Glyptotek, c. 70 AD

Roman emperor
- Reign: 1 July 69 – 23 June 79
- Predecessor: Vitellius
- Successor: Titus
- Born: Titus Flavius Vespasianus; 17 November 9 AD; Falacrinum, Italy
- Died: 23 June 79 (aged 69); Aquae Cutiliae
- Burial: Rome
- Spouses: Domitilla the Elder (died before 69); Caenis (mistress and later concubine after his wife's death c. 65–74)
- Issue Detail: Titus; Domitilla the Younger; Domitian
Regnal name
- Imperator Caesar Vespasianus Augustus
- Dynasty: Flavian
- Father: Titus Flavius Sabinus
- Mother: Vespasia Polla

Vespasian (/vɛsˈpeɪʒ(i)ən, -ziən/; full birth name Latin: Titus Flavius Vespasianus, pronounced [ˈt̪ɪt̪ʊs ˈfɫaːwijʊs wɛs.pasiˈjaːnʊs]) 17 November 9 AD – 23 June 79) was Roman emperor from 69 to 79. The last emperor to reign in the Year of the Four Emperors, he founded the Flavian dynasty, which lasted for 27 years. His fiscal reforms and consolidation of the empire brought political stability and an extensive building program.

After Vitellius, Vespasian was the second emperor from an equestrian family and the first emperor who rose later in his lifetime into the senatorial rank as the first member of his family to do so. He rose to prominence through military achievement: he served as legate of Legio II Augusta during the Roman invasion of Britain in 43, and later led the suppression of the Jewish rebellion of 66–70.

When the emperor Nero committed suicide in June 68, Vespasian was engaged in the campaign in Judaea. Rome was plunged into a year of civil war known as the Year of the Four Emperors. After the first two claimants, Galba and Otho, died in quick succession, Vitellius became emperor in April 69. The Roman legions of Egypt and Judaea reacted by declaring Vespasian, their commander, emperor on 1 July 69. Vespasian then joined forces with Mucianus, the governor of Syria, and Primus, a general in Pannonia. The latter two led the Flavian forces against Vitellius in Rome, while Vespasian took control of Egypt. On 20 December 69, Vitellius was defeated, and the following day Vespasian was declared emperor by the Senate.

Little information survives about the government during Vespasian's ten-year rule. He reformed the financial system of the Roman Empire after the campaign against Judaea ended successfully, and initiated several ambitious construction projects, including the building of the Flavian Amphitheatre, better known today as the Colosseum. Through his general Agricola, Vespasian expanded Roman control in Britain. Vespasian is often credited with restoring political stability to Rome following the chaotic reigns of his predecessors. After he died in 79, he was succeeded by his elder son, Titus, thus becoming the first Roman emperor to be succeeded by his natural son and establishing the Flavian dynasty.

== Early life ==
Vespasian was born in a village north-east of Rome called Falacrinae, the son of Titus Flavius Sabinus, a Roman moneylender, debt collector, and tax collector. His family was relatively undistinguished and lacking in pedigree. His mother, Vespasia Polla, also belonged to an equestrian family, with her father rising to the rank of prefect of the camp and her brother becoming a Senator.

Vespasian was educated in the countryside, in Cosa, near what is today Ansedonia, Italy, under the guidance of his paternal grandmother, so much so that even when he became emperor, he often returned to the places of his childhood, having left the former villa exactly as it had been.

Early in his life he was somewhat overshadowed by his older brother, Titus Flavius Sabinus, who had entered public life and pursued the cursus honorum, holding an important military command in the Danube.

== Military and political career ==
=== Early career ===
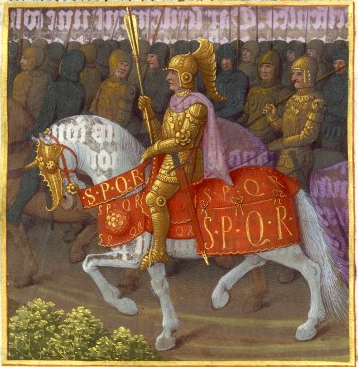
Vespasian leading his forces against the Jewish revolt, a miniature in a 1470 illuminated manuscript version of the history of Josephus

In preparation for a praetorship, Vespasian needed two periods of service in the minor magistracies, one military and the other public. Vespasian served in the military in Thracia for about three years. On his return to Rome in about 30 AD, he obtained a post in the vigintivirate, the minor magistracies, most probably in one of the posts in charge of street cleaning. His early performance was so unsuccessful that Emperor Caligula reportedly stuffed handfuls of muck down his toga to correct the uncleaned Roman streets, formally his responsibility.

During the period of the ascendancy of Sejanus, there is no record of Vespasian engaging in any significant political activity. After completion of a term in the vigintivirate, Vespasian was entitled to stand for election as quaestor, a senatorial office. However, his lack of political or family influence meant that Vespasian served as quaestor in one of the provincial posts in Crete, rather than as assistant to important men in Rome.

Next he needed to gain a praetorship, carrying the Imperium, but non-patricians and the less well-connected had to serve in at least one intermediary post as an aedile or tribune. Vespasian failed at his first attempt to gain an aedileship but was successful in his second attempt, becoming an aedile in 38. Despite his lack of significant family connections or success in office, he achieved praetorship in either 39 or 40, at the youngest age permitted (30), during a period of political upheaval in the organisation of elections. His long-standing relationship with freed-woman Antonia Caenis, confidential secretary to Antonia Minor (the Emperor's grandmother) and part of the circle of courtiers and servants around the Emperor, may have contributed to his success.

=== Invasion of Britannia ===
Upon the accession of Claudius as emperor in 41, Vespasian was appointed legate of Legio II Augusta, stationed in Germania, thanks to the influence of the Imperial freedman Narcissus. In 43, Vespasian and the II Augusta participated in the Roman invasion of Britain, and he distinguished himself under the overall command of Aulus Plautius. After participating in crucial early battles on the rivers Medway and Thames, he was sent to reduce the south west, penetrating through regions later known as the counties of Hampshire, Wiltshire, Dorset, Somerset, Devon and Cornwall with the probable objectives of securing the south coast ports and harbours along with the tin mines of Cornwall and the silver and lead mines of Somerset.

Vespasian marched from Noviomagus Reginorum (Chichester) to subdue the hostile Durotriges and Dumnonii tribes, and captured twenty oppida (towns, or more probably hill forts, including Hod Hill and Maiden Castle in Dorset). He also invaded Vectis (now the Isle of Wight), finally setting up a fortress and legionary headquarters at Isca Dumnoniorum (Exeter). During this time he injured himself and had not fully recovered until he went to Egypt. These successes earned him triumphal regalia (ornamenta triumphalia) on his return to Rome.

=== Later political career ===
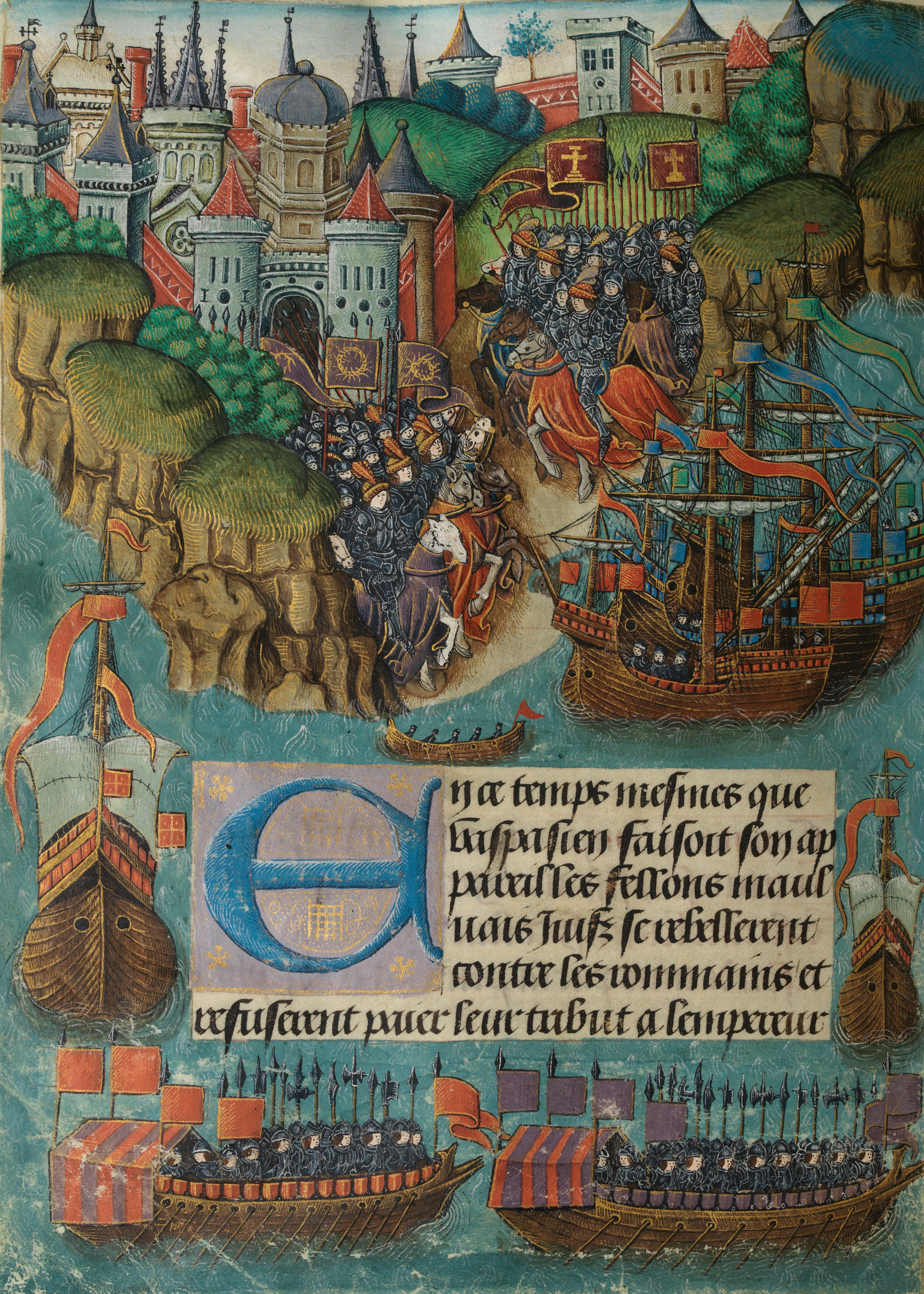
Roman Emperor Nero sends Vespasian with an army to put down the Jewish revolt, 66 AD (depiction of 1503)

His success as the legate of a legion earned him a consulship in 51, after which he retired from public life, having incurred the enmity of Claudius' wife, Agrippina, who was the most powerful and influential figure in her husband's reign. He came out of retirement in 63 when he was sent as governor to Africa Province. According to Tacitus (ii.97), his rule was "infamous and odious" but according to Suetonius (Vesp. 4), he was "upright and, highly honourable". On one occasion, Suetonius writes, Vespasian was pelted with turnips.

Vespasian used his time in North Africa wisely. Usually, governorships were seen by ex-consuls as opportunities to extort huge amounts of money to regain the wealth they had spent on their previous political campaigns. Corruption was so rife that it was almost expected that a governor would come back from these appointments with his pockets full. However, Vespasian used his time in North Africa making friends instead of money, something that would be far more valuable in the years to come. During his time in North Africa, he found himself in financial difficulties and was forced to mortgage his estates to his brother. To revive his fortunes he turned to the mule trade and gained the nickname mulio (muleteer).

Returning from Africa, Vespasian toured Greece in Nero's retinue, but lost Imperial favor after paying insufficient attention (some sources suggest he fell asleep) during one of the Emperor's recitals on the lyre, and found himself in the political wilderness.

=== First Jewish Revolt ===
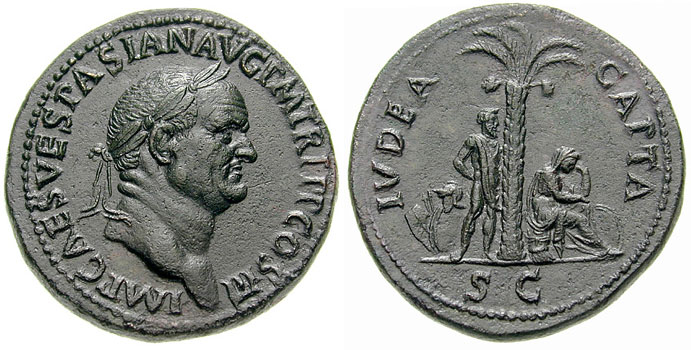
Vespasian sestertius, struck in 71 to celebrate the victory in the first Jewish–Roman War. Obverse: IMP. CAES. VESPASIAN AVG. P. M., TR. P., P. P., COS. III. The legend on the reverse says: IVDEA CAPTA, "Judaea conquered" – S. C.

In 66 AD, Vespasian was appointed to suppress the Jewish revolt underway in Judea. The fighting there had killed the previous governor and routed Cestius Gallus, the governor of Syria, when he tried to restore order. Two legions, with eight cavalry squadrons and ten auxiliary cohorts, were therefore dispatched under the command of Vespasian while his elder son, Titus, arrived from Alexandria with another.

During this time he became the patron of Flavius Josephus, a Jewish resistance leader captured at the Siege of Yodfat, who would later write his people's history in Greek. Ultimately, thousands of Jews were killed and the Romans destroyed many towns in re-establishing control over Judea; they also took Jerusalem in 70. Vespasian is remembered by Josephus (writing as a Roman citizen), in his Antiquities of the Jews, as a fair and humane official, in contrast with the notorious Herod Agrippa II whom Josephus goes to great lengths to demonize.

While under the emperor's patronage, Josephus wrote that after the Roman Legio X Fretensis, accompanied by Vespasian, destroyed Jericho on 21 June 68, Vespasian took a group of Jews who could not swim (possibly Essenes from Qumran), fettered them, and threw them into the Dead Sea to test the sea's legendary buoyancy. Indeed, the captives bobbed up to the surface after being thrown in the water from the boats.

At the conclusion of the Jewish war, Josephus discussed a prophecy from sacred scripture that about the time when Jerusalem and the Second Temple would be taken, a man from their own nation would become "governor of the habitable earth", as in the Messiah. Josephus interpreted the prophecy as denoting the government of Vespasian. Tacitus agreed that the prophecy discussed Vespasian (as well as Titus), but that "the common people, with the usual blindness of ambition, had interpreted these mighty destinies of themselves, and could not be brought even by disasters to believe the truth."

According to the Babylonian Talmud, during this time, Rabban Yochanan ben Zakkai was a leader of the Jewish people and agreed to sneak out of the city to meet with Vespasian. When Rabban Yochanan ben Zakkai reached the Roman camp, he said to Vespasian "Greetings to you, the king; greetings to you, the king." Vespasian replied that the Rabbi should be put to death because the Rabbi falsely called him "king." In the meantime, as they were talking, a messenger from Rome arrived and told him that the previous Emperor had died, and that the Noblemen wanted to appoint Vespasian as King. Vespasian was surprised to learn that the Rabbi's greeting had come true. He acknowledged the wisdom of the Rabbi and offered to grant a request of his choice. The Rabbi said "Give me Yavne and its Sages and do not destroy it, and spare the dynasty of Rabban Gamliel and do not kill them as if they were rebels, and lastly give me doctors to heal Rabbi Tzadok." This story reflected Rabban Yochanan ben Zakkai's efforts to maintain the future of the Jewish people after the destruction of the Temple.

== Year of the Four Emperors (69) ==
Map of the Roman Empire during the Year of the Four Emperors (69). Blue areas indicate provinces loyal to Vespasian and Gaius Licinius Mucianus.

After the death of Nero in 68, Rome saw a succession of short-lived emperors and a year of civil wars. Galba was murdered by supporters of Otho, who was defeated by Vitellius. Otho's supporters, looking for another candidate to support, settled on Vespasian. According to Suetonius, a prophecy ubiquitous in the Eastern provinces claimed that from Judaea would come the future rulers of the world. Vespasian eventually believed that this prophecy applied to him, and found a number of omens and oracles that reinforced this belief.

Although Vespasian and Titus resolved to challenge for the Principate in February 69, they made no move until later in the year. Throughout the early months of 69, Vespasian convened frequently with the Eastern generals. Gaius Licinius Mucianus was a notable ally. Governor of Syria and commander of three legions, Mucianus also held political connections to many of the most powerful Roman military commanders from Illyricum to Britannia by virtue of his service to the famous Neronian general Gnaeus Domitius Corbulo. In May 69, Mucianus formally implored Vespasian to challenge Vitellius. His appeal was followed by Vespasian's official proclamation as Emperor in early July. Under instructions from the prefect Tiberius Alexander, the legions at Alexandria took an oath of loyalty to Vespasian on 1 July. They were swiftly followed by Vespasian's Judaean legions on 3 July and thereafter by Mucianus' Syrian legions on 15 July.

Vitellius, the occupant of the throne, had the veteran legions of Gaul and the Rhineland. But the feeling in Vespasian's favour quickly gathered strength, and the armies of Moesia, Pannonia, and Illyricum soon declared for him. The praefectus Aegypti, who had been governor since Nero's reign, proclaimed Vespasian emperor at Alexandria on 1 July 69 AD.

While Vespasian himself was in Egypt, his troops entered Italy from the northeast under the leadership of Marcus Antonius Primus. They defeated Vitellius' army (which had awaited him in Mevania) at Bedriacum (or Betriacum), sacked Cremona and advanced on Rome. Vitellius hastily arranged a peace with Antonius, but the Emperor's Praetorian Guard forced him to retain his seat. After furious fighting, Antonius' army entered Rome. In the resulting confusion, the Capitol was destroyed by fire and both Vitellius and Vespasian's brother Sabinus were killed. At Alexandria, Vespasian immediately sent supplies of urgently needed grain to Rome, along with an edict assuring he would reverse the laws of Nero, especially those relating to treason.

He was the first emperor since Augustus to appear in Egypt. While there, he visited the Temple of Serapis where he reportedly experienced a vision, and he performed healing miracles. He was hailed as pharaoh and proclaimed the son of the creator-deity Amun (Zeus-Ammon) in the style of the ancient pharaohs, and an incarnation of Serapis in the manner of the Ptolemies.

== Emperor (69–79) ==
=== Aftermath of the civil war ===
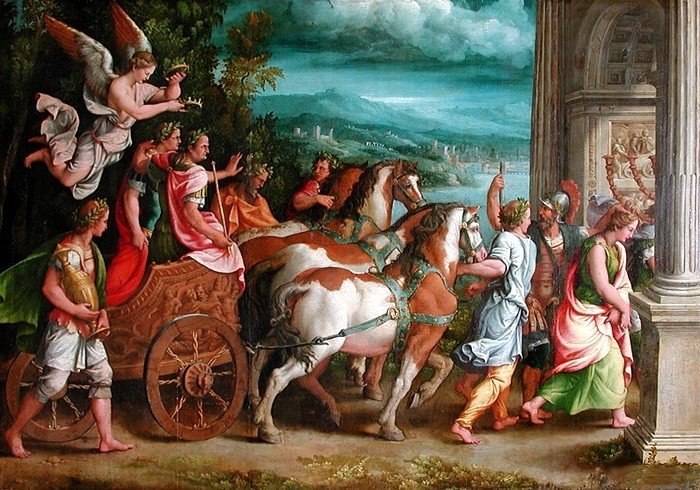
Triumph of Titus and Vespasian by Giulio Romano, c. 1540

Vespasian was declared emperor by the Senate while he was in Egypt on 21 December 69 through the passage of the Lex de imperio Vespasiani; the Egyptians had declared him emperor in the summer. In the short-term, administration of the empire was given to Mucianus, who was aided by Vespasian's son, Domitian. Mucianus started off Vespasian's rule with tax reform that was to restore the empire's finances. After Vespasian arrived in Rome in mid-70, Mucianus continued to press Vespasian to collect as many taxes as possible.

Vespasian and Mucianus renewed old taxes and instituted new ones, increased the tribute of the provinces, and kept a watchful eye upon the treasury officials.

Before Vespasian, Emperor Nero introduced a urine tax on public toilets under the name of vectigal urinae in the 1st century AD (see pay toilet). However, the tax was removed after a while and it was Vespasian's new imposition of this tax around 70 AD which we still remember to this day, possibly giving origin to the Latin proverb Pecunia non olet ("Money does not stink"): Writing about Vespasian in their history books, Dio Cassius and Suetonius mentioned "When [Vespasian's] son Titus blamed him for even laying a tax upon urine, he applied to his nose a piece of the money he received in the first instalment, and asked him if it stunk. And he replying no, 'And yet,' said he, 'it is derived from urine". Since then, this phrase "Money does not stink" has been used to whitewash dubious or illegal origin of money.

==== Turmoil through the Empire ====
In early 70 Vespasian was still in Egypt, the source of Rome's grain supply, and had not yet left for Rome. According to Tacitus, his trip was delayed due to bad weather. Modern historians theorize that Vespasian had been and was continuing to consolidate support from the Egyptians before departing. During this period, protests erupted in Alexandria over his new tax policies and grain shipments were held up. Vespasian eventually restored order and grain shipments to Rome resumed. Notably Titus attended the consecration of a new Apis bull at Memphis in 70, and Vespasian's reign saw imperial patronage given to Egyptian temples: at the Dakhla Oasis in the Western Desert as well as Esna, Kom Ombo, Medinet Habu, Silsila in the Nile Valley.

In addition to the uprising in Egypt, unrest and civil war continued in the rest of the empire in 70. Judea had been rebelling since 66. Vespasian's son, Titus, finally subdued the rebellion with the capture of Jerusalem and destruction of the Jewish Temple in 70. According to Eusebius, Vespasian then ordered all descendants of the royal line of David to be hunted down, causing the Jews to be persecuted from province to province. Several modern historians have suggested that Vespasian, already having been told by Josephus that he was prophesied to become emperor whilst in Judaea, was probably reacting to other widely known Messianic prophecies circulating at the time, to suppress any rival claimants arising from that dynasty. The Jewish temple at Leontopolis was sacked in 73.

In January 70, an uprising occurred in Gaul and Germany, known as the second Batavian Rebellion. This rebellion was headed by Gaius Julius Civilis and Julius Sabinus. Sabinus, claiming he was descended from Julius Caesar, declared himself Emperor of Gaul. The rebellion defeated and absorbed two Roman legions before it was suppressed by Vespasian's son-in-law, Quintus Petillius Cerialis, by the end of 70.

=== Arrival in Rome and consolidation of power ===
In mid-70, Vespasian first went to Rome, dating his tribunician years from 1 July 69. Vespasian immediately embarked on a series of efforts to stay in power and prevent future revolts. He offered gifts to many in the military and much of the public. Soldiers loyal to Vitellius were dismissed or punished. Vespasian also restructured the Senatorial and Equestrian orders, removing his enemies and adding his allies. Regional autonomy of Greek provinces was repealed.

==== Propaganda campaign ====
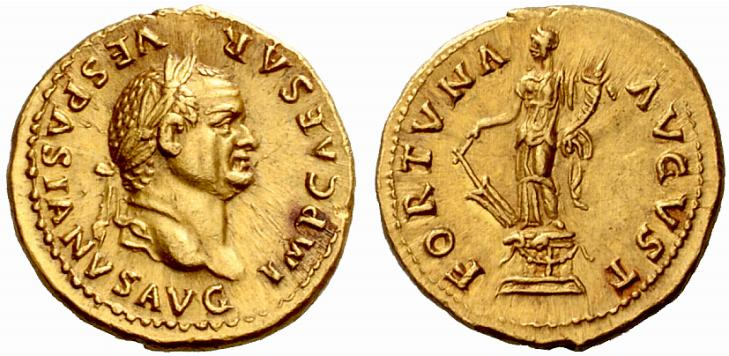
Roman aureus depicting Vespasian as Emperor. The reverse shows the goddess Fortuna. Caption: IMP. CAESAR VESPASIANVS AVG. / FORTVNA AVGVST

We know from Suetonius that the "unexpected and still quite new emperor was lacking auctoritas [English: backing, support] and a certain maiestas [English: majesty]". Many modern historians note the increased amount of propaganda that appeared during Vespasian's reign. A component of the propaganda was the theology of victory, which legitimized the right to rule through successful conquest. This revolved around Vespasian's victory in Judea. Stories of a supernatural emperor who was destined to rule circulated in the empire. Nearly one-third of all coins minted in Rome under Vespasian celebrated military victory or peace. The word vindex was removed from coins so as not to remind the public of rebellious Vindex. Construction projects bore inscriptions praising Vespasian and condemning previous emperors. A temple of peace was constructed in the forum as well.

=== Construction and conspiracies ===
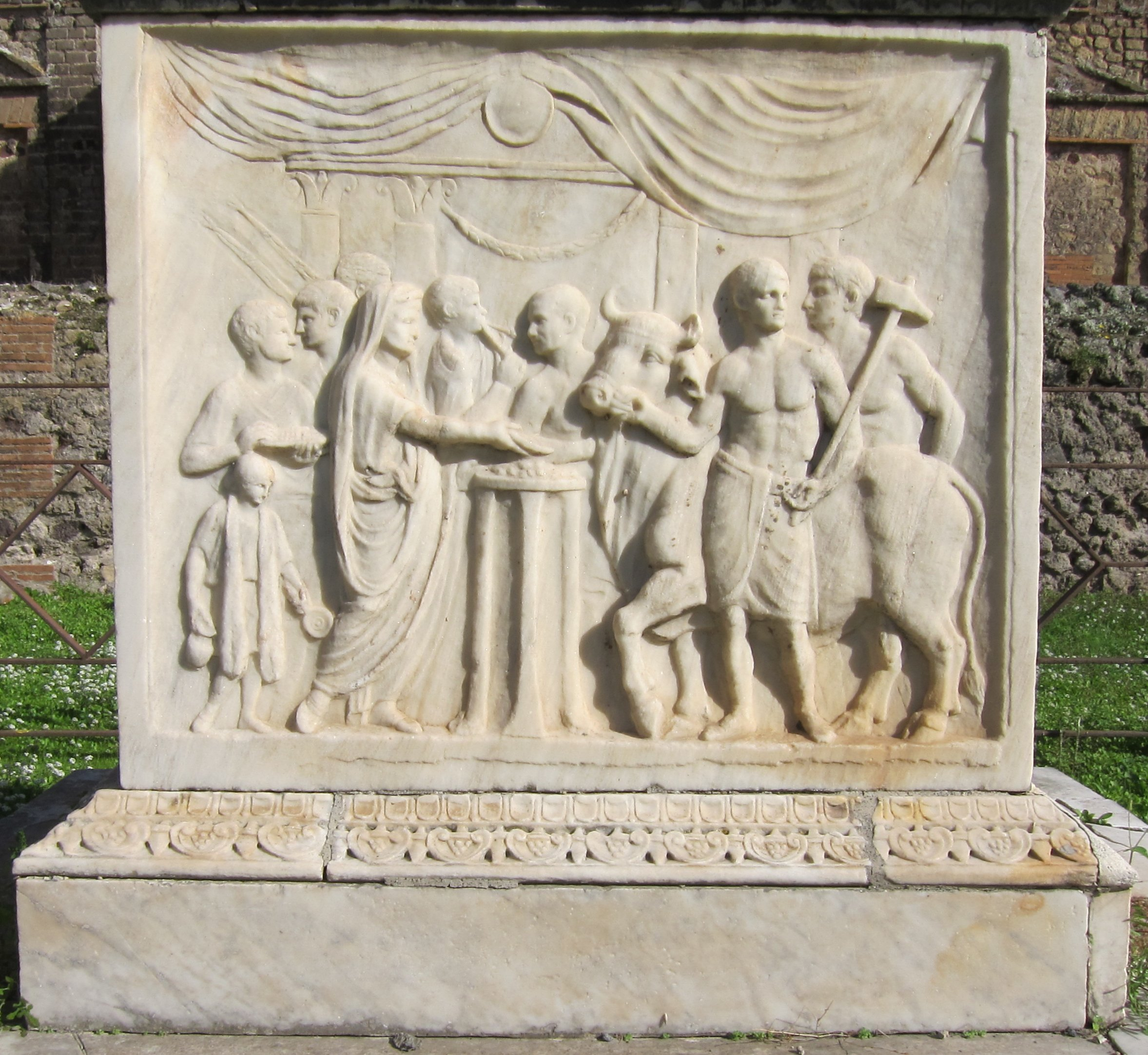
Relief depicting an animal sacrifice, from an altar of the Temple of Vespasian in Pompeii

Between 71 and 79, much of Vespasian's reign is a mystery. Historians report that Vespasian ordered the construction of several buildings in Rome. Additionally, he survived several conspiracies against him. Vespasian helped rebuild Rome after the civil war. He added the temple of Peace and the temple to the Deified Claudius. In 75, he erected a colossal statue of Apollo, begun under Nero, and he dedicated a stage of the theatre of Marcellus. He also began construction of the Colosseum, using funds from the spoils of the Jewish Temple after the Siege of Jerusalem. Suetonius claims that Vespasian was met with "constant conspiracies" against him. Only one conspiracy is known specifically, though. In 78 or 79, Eprius Marcellus and Aulus Caecina Alienus attempted to kill Vespasian. Why these men turned against Vespasian is not known.

=== Roman expansion in Britain ===
Agricola was appointed to the command of the Legio XX Valeria Victrix, stationed in Britain, in place of Marcus Roscius Coelius, who had stirred up a mutiny against the governor, Marcus Vettius Bolanus. Britain had revolted during the year of civil war, and Bolanus was a mild governor. Agricola reimposed discipline on the legion and helped to consolidate Roman rule. In 71, Bolanus was replaced by a more aggressive governor, Quintus Petillius Cerialis, and Agricola was able to display his talents as a commander in campaigns against the Brigantes in northern England.

=== Death ===
In his ninth consulship Vespasian had a slight illness in Campania and, returning at once to Rome, he left for Aquae Cutiliae and the country around Reate, where he spent every summer; however, his illness worsened and he developed severe diarrhea.

According to Suetonius, with the feeling of death overwhelming him on his deathbed, he joked: "Vae, puto deus fio." ("Dear me, I think I'm becoming a god").

Taken on a sudden with such an attack of diarrhoea that he all but swooned, he said: "An emperor ought to die standing," and while he was struggling to get on his feet, he died in the arms of those who tried to help him, on the ninth day before the Kalends of July [June 23], at the age of sixty-nine years, seven months and seven days.

— Suetonius, Lives of the Twelve Caesars, "Life of Vespasian" §24

He died on 23 June 79 AD, and was succeeded by his sons Titus and then Domitian.

== Legacy ==
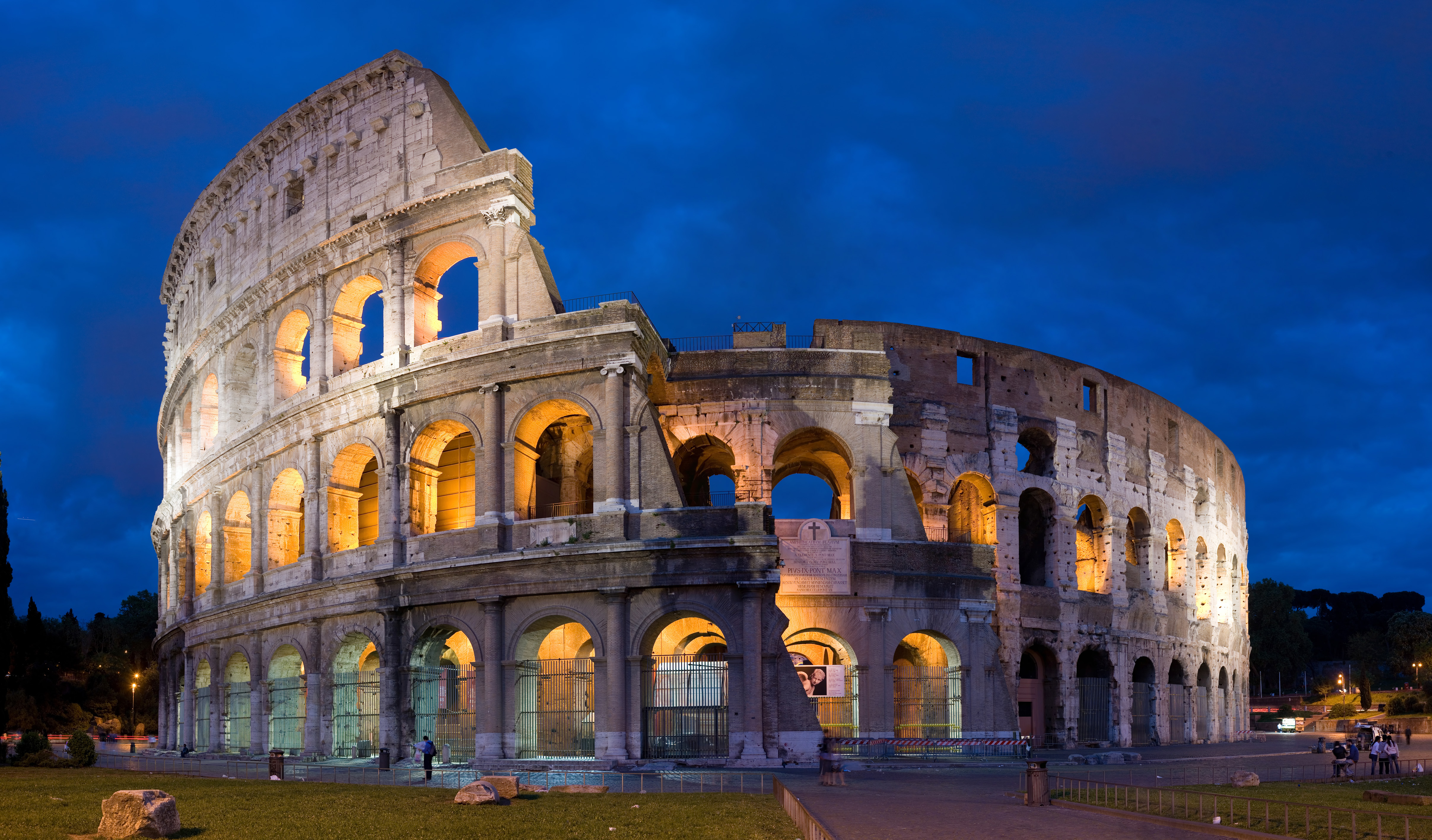
Construction of the Flavian Amphitheatre, better known as the Colosseum in Rome, was begun by Vespasian and finished by his son Titus.

Vespasian was known for his wit and his amiable manner alongside his commanding personality and military prowess. He could be liberal to impoverished Senators and equestrians and to cities and towns desolated by natural calamity. He was especially generous to men of letters and rhetors, several of whom he pensioned with salaries of as much as 1,000 gold pieces a year. Quintilian is said to have been the first public teacher who enjoyed this imperial favor. Pliny the Elder's work, the Natural History, was written during Vespasian's reign, and dedicated to Vespasian's son Titus.

Vespasian distrusted philosophers in general. It was the talk of philosophers, who liked to glorify the Republic, that provoked Vespasian into reviving the obsolete penal laws against this profession as a precautionary measure.

He was also noted for his benefactions to the people. Much money was spent on public works and the restoration and beautification of Rome: the Temple of Peace (also known as the Forum of Vespasian), new public baths and the great showpiece, the Colosseum. Vespasian’s administration has also been credited with the creation of jobs as a result of its construction programmes, together with providing loans to private citizens to fix their homes and buildings; the latter policy of which contributed to the growth of the construction industry.

Vespasian slightly debased the denarius during his reign, reducing the silver purity from 93.5% to 90%. The silver weight dropped from 2.97 grams to 2.87 grams.

In modern Romance languages, urinals are named after him (for example, vespasiano in Italian, and vespasienne in French), probably in reference to a tax he placed on urine collection.

=== Forging history ===
Vespasian approved histories written under his reign, ensuring biases against him were removed. He also gave financial rewards to writers. The ancient historians who lived through the period such as Tacitus, Suetonius and Josephus speak suspiciously well of Vespasian while condemning the emperors who came before him. Tacitus admits that his status was elevated by Vespasian and Josephus identifies Vespasian as a patron and saviour. Meanwhile, Pliny the Elder dedicated his Natural Histories to Vespasian's son, Titus.

Those who spoke against Vespasian were punished. A number of Stoic philosophers were accused of corrupting students with inappropriate teachings and were expelled from Rome. Helvidius Priscus, a pro-Republic philosopher, was executed for his teachings. Numerous other philosophers and writers had their works seized, destroyed and denounced for being deemed too critical of Vespasian's reign, some even posthumously.

According to Suetonius' version of events, however, Vespasian "bore the frank language of his friends, the quips of pleaders, and the impudence of the philosophers with the greatest patience" as it was only Helvidius Priscus to be put to death after he repeatedly affronted the Emperor with studied insults which he initially tried to ignore; the philosopher Demetrius for example was banished to an island and when Vespasian heard that Demetrius was still criticizing him, sending the exiled philosopher the message: "You are doing everything to force me to kill you, but I do not slay a barking dog."

== Family and personal life ==
=== Ancestors and relatives ===
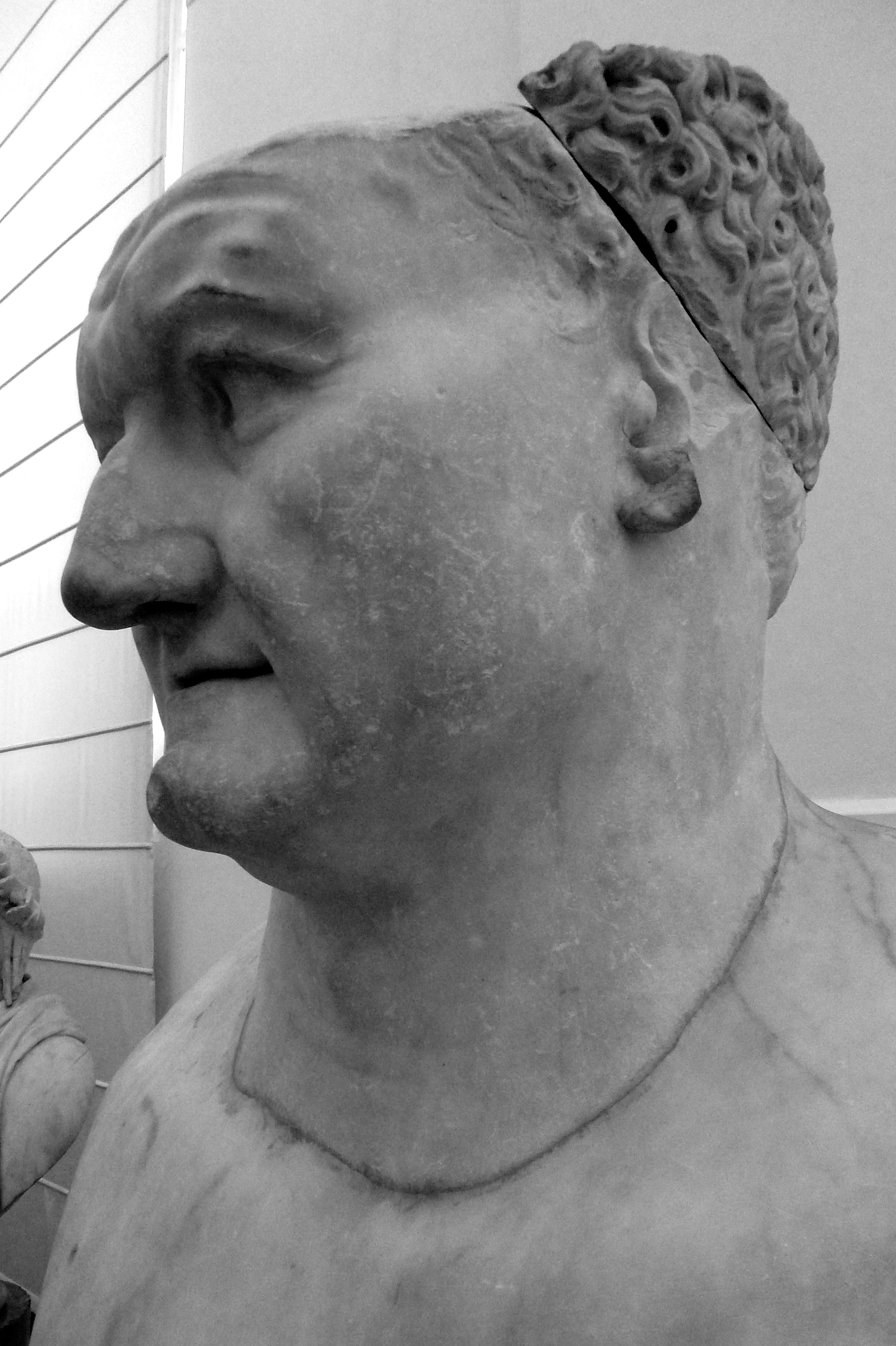
Bust of Vespasian from National Archaeological Museum of Naples

His paternal grandfather, Titus Flavius Petro, became the first to distinguish himself, rising to the rank of centurion and fighting at Pharsalus for Pompey in 48 BC. Subsequently, he became a debt collector. Petro's son, Titus Flavius Sabinus, worked as a customs official in the province of Asia and became a moneylender on a small scale among the Helvetii. He earned a reputation as a scrupulous and honest "tax-farmer". Sabinus married up in status, to Vespasia Polla, whose father had risen to the rank of prefect of the camp and whose brother became a Senator.

Sabinus and Vespasia had three children, the eldest of whom, a girl, died in infancy. The elder boy, Titus Flavius Sabinus, entered public life and pursued the cursus honorum. Vespasian on the other hand, seemed far less likely to be successful, initially not wishing to pursue high public office. He followed in his brother's footsteps when driven to it by his mother's taunting.

=== Marriage and children ===
During this period he married Flavia Domitilla, the daughter of Flavius Liberalis from Ferentium and formerly the mistress of Statilius Capella, a Roman equestrian from Sabratha in Africa. They had two sons, Titus Flavius Vespasianus (born 39) and Titus Flavius Domitianus (born 51), and a daughter, Domitilla (born c. 45). His wife Domitilla and his daughter Domitilla both died before Vespasian became Emperor in 69. After the death of his wife, Vespasian's long-standing mistress, Antonia Caenis, became his wife in all but formal status, a relationship that continued until she died in 75.

== Gallery ==
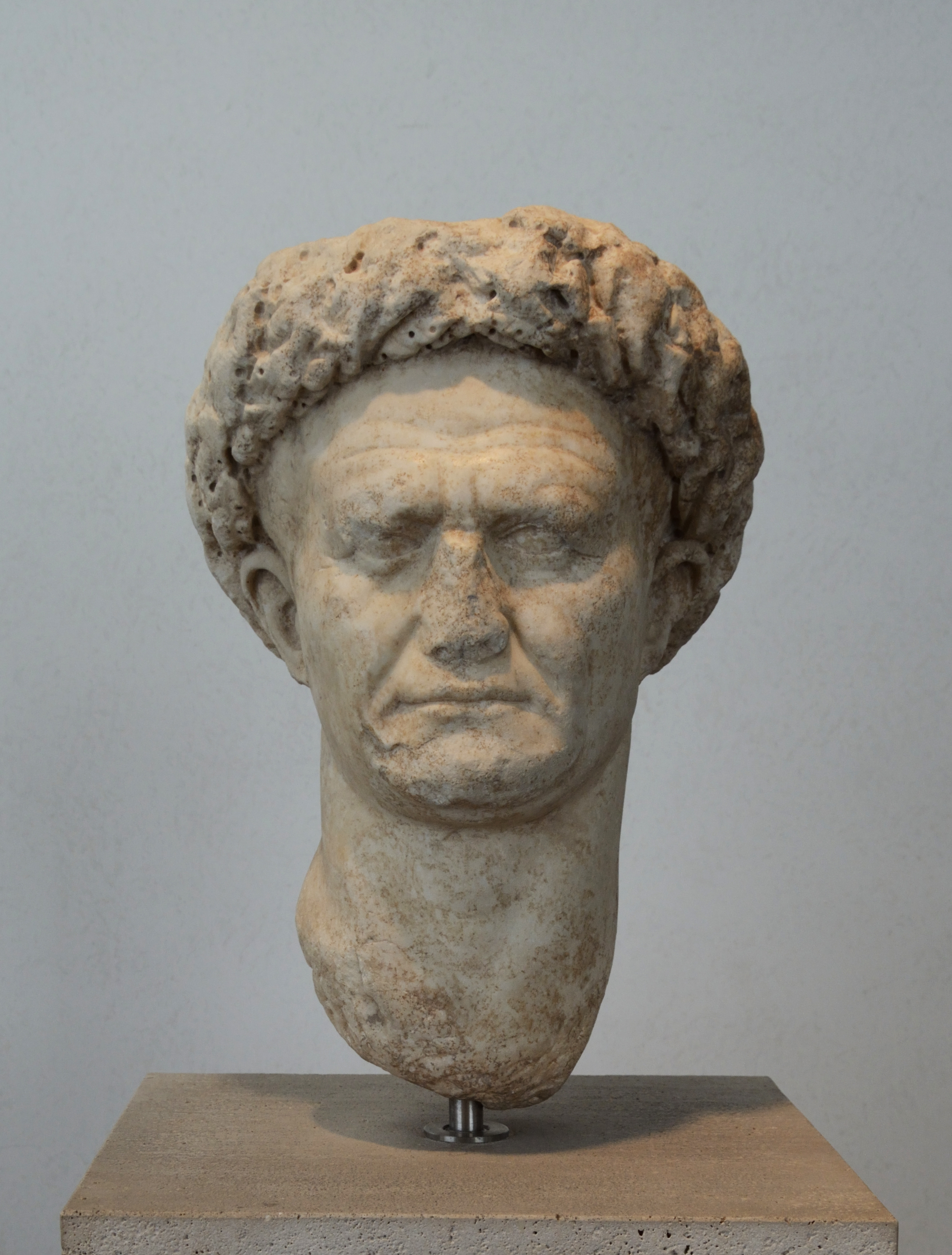
Portrait bust of Vespasian wearing the civic crown, Palazzo Massimo, Rome

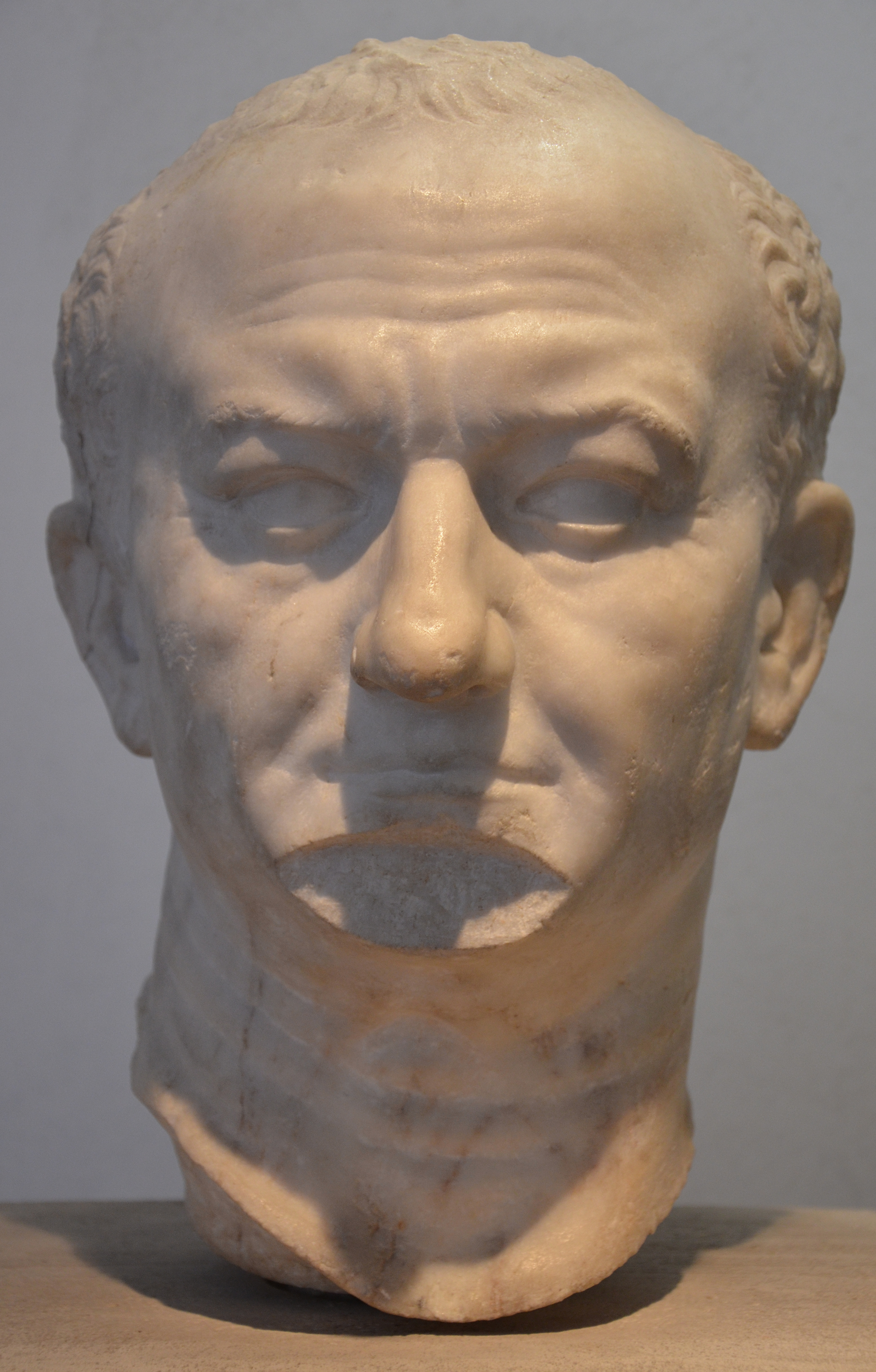
Portrait bust of Vespasian from Ostia, 69–79 AD, Palazzo Massimo alle Terme, Rome

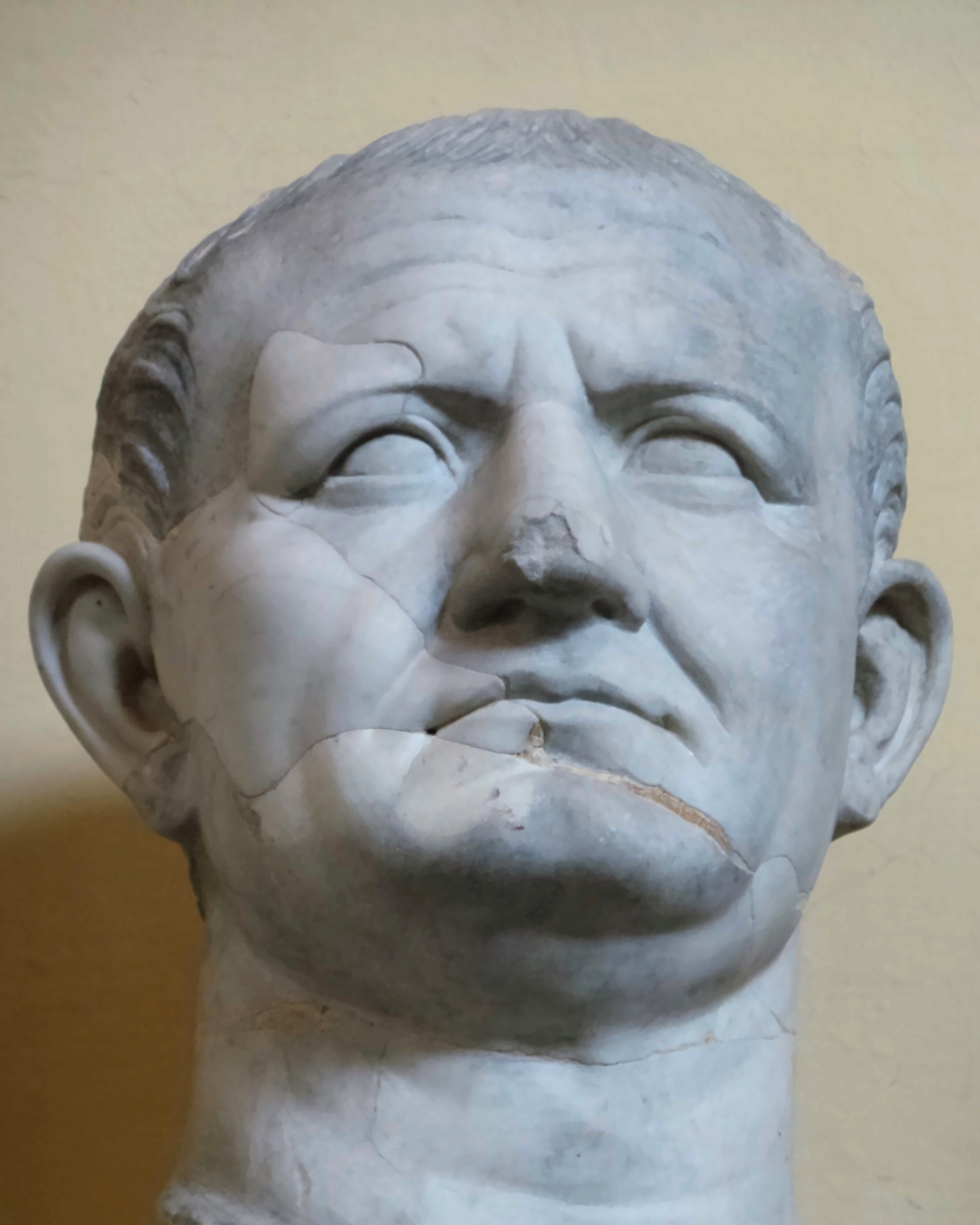
Restored original portrait of Vespasian. Vatican Museums, Rome

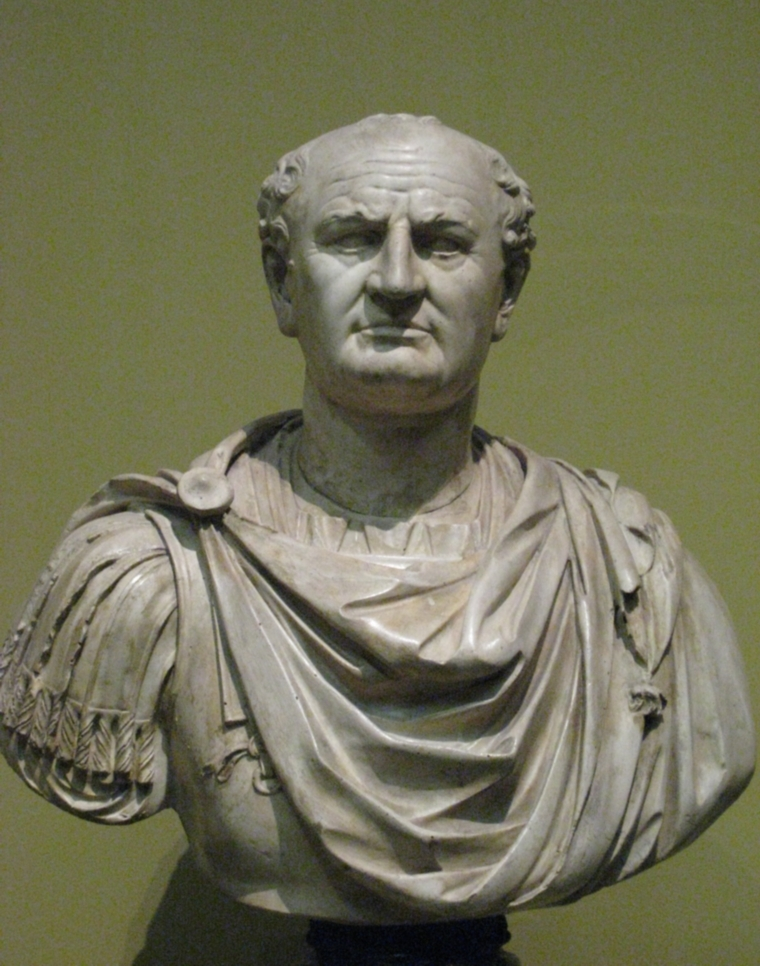
Replica of a modern bust of Vespasian, Pushkin Museum, Moscow

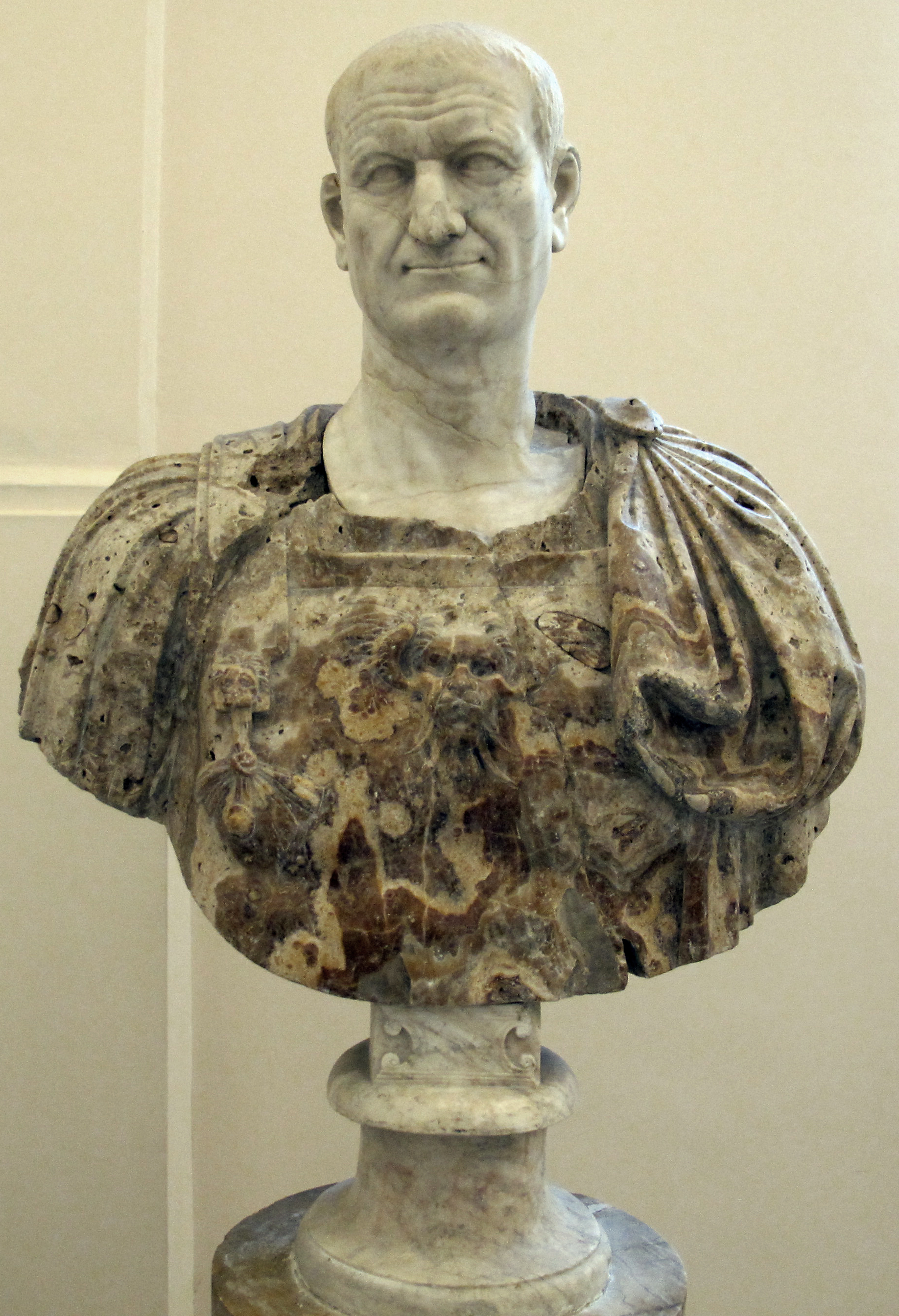
Bust of Vespasian, c. 80 AD, Farnese Collection, Naples National Archaeological Museum

== Flavian family tree ==
FLAVIAN DYNASTY detailed family tree

Titus Flavius Petro	Tertulla	Vespasius Pollio	Julia the Younger
Titus Flavius Sabinus	Vespasia Polla	Vespasius (praetor)	Aemilia Lepida	Agrippina the Elder	Germanicus
Titus Flavius Sabinus	Vespasian (69–79)	Domitilla the Elder	Flavia (died young)	Junia Lepida	Vistilia
Titus Flavius Sabinus	Domitilla the Younger	Titus (79–81)	Arrecina Tertulla	Cassia Longina	Gnaeus Domitius Corbulo	Caesonia	Caligula (37–41)
Titus Flavius Sabinus	Titus Flavius Clemens	Flavia Domitilla	Julia Flavia	Domitian (81–96)	Domitia Longina	Domitia
Flavius Caesar

== See also ==
- List of Roman emperors
- Pecunia non olet
- Stele of Vespasian

== Sources ==
=== Primary sources ===
- Tacitus, Histories, English translation
- Suetonius, The Lives of Twelve Caesars, Life of Vespasian, Latin text with English translation
- Cassius Dio, Roman History, Books 64, 65 and 66, Latin text with English translation
- Flavius Josephus, The War of the Jews, Books 2, 3 and 4, English translation

=== Secondary sources ===
- Cooley, Alison E. (2012). The Cambridge Manual of Latin Epigraphy. Cambridge University Press. ISBN 978-0-521-84026-2.
- Lissner, I. (1958). "Power and Folly: The Story of the Caesars". Jonathan Cape Ltd., London.
- Morgan, Gwyn (2006). 69 A. D. The Year of the Four Emperors. London: Oxford University Press. pp. 170–173. ISBN 978-0-19-512468-2.
- Levick, Barbara (1999). Vespasian. Oxford: Routledge. ISBN 978-0-415-16618-8.
- Roberts, J., ed. (2007). "Vespasian (Titus Flāvius Vespāsiānus)". Oxford Dictionary of the Classical World. Oxford University Press. ISBN 978-0-19-172706-1.
- Caldwell, T. (2015). The Career of Licinius Mucianus (MA). The University of Melbourne. hdl:11343/91093.

Vespasian Flavian dynasty Born: 17 November AD 9 Died: 23 June AD 79
Political offices
Preceded by Vitellius	Roman emperor 69–79	Succeeded by Titus
Preceded by Gaius Quintius Atticus; Gnaeus Caecilius Simplex	Roman consul 70–72 with Titus (70); Nerva (71); Titus (72)	Succeeded by Domitian; Lucius Valerius Catullus Messallinus
Preceded by Domitian; Lucius Valerius Catullus Messallinus	Roman consul 74–77 with Titus	Succeeded by Decimus Iunius Novius Priscus Rufus; Lucius Ceionius Commodus Verus
Preceded by Decimus Iunius Novius Priscus Rufus; Lucius Ceionius Commodus	Roman consul 79 with Titus	Succeeded by Titus; Domitian
