= Vipsania Marcella =

Vipsania Marcella is a name retrospectively given by historians to a possible daughter or daughters of the ancient Roman general Marcus Vipsanius Agrippa and his second wife Claudia Marcella Major, the eldest niece of emperor Augustus.

== History ==
It was once thought that Agrippa and Marcella only had one surviving child together, a daughter whom no real information about was available, this daughter was given a composite name to distinguish her from her sisters from Agrippa's other marriages. (Note: Due to Roman naming conventions all daughters of a man were named the same thing in Republican Rome, the feminized form of their fathers nomen and as Agrippa was a Vipsanius all his daughters would have been named Vipsania.) But as new information was discovered and men such as Quintus Haterius, Publius Quinctilius Varus, and Marcus Aemilius Lepidus began to be speculated to have been Agrippa's sons-in-law by a daughter or daughters of Marcella opinions began to shift. Ronald Syme believed the wives of each men were three different people, one Vipsania who married Varus, a Vipsania who married Lepidus and one Vipsania who married Haterius, but Syme also argued that Haterius wife was a daughter of Agrippa by his first wife Pomponia, not Marcella. Meyer Reinhold rebutted and argued that Varus wife was the daughter of Pomponia, L. Koenen has entertained this possibility as well, while Franziska Knopf thought that Haterius wife could be Marcella's daughter. Some historians also think that Varus and Lepidus wives were not separate people. Nonetheless, Syme's view hold majority opinion in the 21st century.

== Cultural depictions ==
In Robert Graves' books, I, Claudius and Claudius the God, a single daughter of Agrippa and Marcella is mentioned to exist. She is depicted as having committed suicide for unexplained reasons early on, but later in the story Roman empress Livia claims that she killed herself over guilt for committing incest with her father, to secretly instigate his poisoning.
