= Iullus Antonius =

Roman senator and poet (43 BC – 2 BC)

- Born: 43 BC; Rome, Italy, Roman Republic
- Died: 2 BC (aged 40–41)
- Cause of death: Suicide
- Office: Roman consul (10 BC); Governor of Asia (7/6 BC)
- Spouse: Claudia Marcella Major
- Children: 3, including Lucius Antonius and Iulla Antonia
- Parent(s): Mark Antony and Fulvia

Iullus Antonius (43–2 BC) was a Roman magnate and poet. A son of Mark Antony and Fulvia, he was spared by the emperor Augustus after the civil wars of the Republic, and was married to the emperor's niece. He was later condemned as one of the lovers of Augustus's daughter, Julia, and killed himself.

== Life ==
=== Early life ===
Born in Rome, and named after his father's benefactor, Iullus and his elder brother had a disruptive childhood. His mother Fulvia gained many enemies including Octavian (nephew and adopted son of Julius Caesar). His half-sister, Claudia, had been Octavian's first wife; however, in 41 BC, Octavian divorced Claudia without having consummated the marriage and married Scribonia, the mother of Julia the Elder, Octavian's only child. Fulvia saw this as an insult on her family and, together with Iullus' uncle Lucius Antonius, they raised eight legions in Italy to fight for Antonius' rights against Octavian. The army occupied Rome for a short time, but eventually retreated to Perusia (modern Perugia). Octavian besieged Fulvia and Lucius in the winter of 41–40 BC, starving them into surrender. Fulvia was exiled to Sicyon, where she died of a sudden illness.

In the same year of Fulvia's death, Antonius' father Mark Antony married Octavian's full sister, Octavia Minor. The marriage had to be approved by the Senate as Octavia was pregnant with her first husband's child at the time. The marriage was for political purposes to cement an alliance between Octavian and Mark Antony. Octavia appears to have been a loyal and faithful wife who was good and treated her husband's children with the same kindness as her own. Between 40 BC–36 BC, Octavia lived with him in his Athenian mansion. She raised both of Mark Antony's sons and her children by her first husband together for the years of her marriage to their father. They all traveled with him to various provinces. During the marriage Octavia produced two daughters, Iullus' half-sisters Antonia Major and Antonia Minor. Antonia Major was the paternal grandmother of the Emperor Nero and maternal grandmother of the Empress Valeria Messalina. Antonia Minor was the sister-in-law of the Emperor Tiberius, paternal grandmother of the Emperor Caligula and Empress Agrippina the Younger, mother of the Emperor Claudius, and maternal great-grandmother/paternal great-aunt of the Emperor Nero.

=== Civil war ===
In 36 BC, Mark Antony abandoned Octavia and her children in Rome and sailed to Alexandria to rejoin his former lover Cleopatra VII (they had already met in 41 BC and were parents of twin children). Mark Antony divorced Octavia circa 32 BC. Iullus and his half-sisters returned to Rome with Octavia while Iullus' elder brother, Marcus Antonius Antyllus, remained with his father in Egypt. Antyllus was raised by Cleopatra beside his father's children by her, Ptolemy Philadelphus, Alexander Helios and Cleopatra Selene II, and Antyllus' stepbrother Caesarion.

In the Battle of Actium, the fleets of Antony and Cleopatra were destroyed, and they fled to Egypt. In August 30 BC, Octavian, assisted by Marcus Vipsanius Agrippa, invaded Egypt. With no other refuge to escape to, Mark Antony killed himself by falling on his sword, having been tricked into thinking that Cleopatra had already done so. A few days later, Cleopatra did actually die by suicide.

Octavian and his army seized control of Egypt and claimed it as part of the Roman Empire. While Iullus' elder brother Antyllus and his stepbrother Caesarion were murdered by Octavian, he showed some mercy to their half-siblings Alexander Helios, Cleopatra Selene II and Ptolemy Philadelphus. They were given to Iullus' first stepmother Octavia to be raised as Roman citizens. In 27 BC, they returned to Rome, and Octavian was given the title of Augustus.

=== Career and marriage ===
Following the civil wars, Iullus was granted high favours from Augustus, through Octavia's influence. In 21 BC Augustus wanted his daughter Julia the Elder to marry Agrippa, who at the time was married to Iullus' stepsister Claudia Marcella Major. Agrippa agreed to the marriage and so divorced Marcella. Marcella consequently obliged Iullus to marry her. Iullus and Marcella's children were the sons Iullus Antonius, Lucius Antonius and a daughter Iulla Antonia.

Iullus became praetor in 13 BC, consul in 10 BC, and Asian proconsul in 7/6 BC, and was highly regarded by Augustus. Horace refers to him in a poem, speaking of an occasion when Iullus intended to write a higher kind of poetry praising Augustus for his success in Gaul. Iullus was also a poet and is credited with having written twelve volumes of poetry on Diomedia some time before 13 BC, which has not survived.

=== Scandal and death ===
Although when their relationship began is uncertain, Iullus Antonius became a lover of Julia the Elder. Agrippa died in 12 BC and Julia had been forced to marry her stepbrother, Tiberius. Julia's marriage to her stepbrother had become a disaster and she was desperate to divorce him, and Iullus was open to satisfy her desires. Tiberius had left Rome in 8 BC leaving behind Julia and her five children by Agrippa, Gaius Caesar, Lucius Caesar, Julia the Younger, Agrippina the Elder, and Agrippa Postumus. Julia felt that her children were unprotected and may have approached Iullus to be a protector for her children, especially her two elder sons, Gaius Caesar and Lucius Caesar, who were Augustus' joint heirs.

Both contemporary and modern historians have suggested Iullus had designs upon the monarchy, and wanted to marry Julia before her children Gaius and Lucius came of age possibly to form some sort of regency. It is unlikely, however, that Julia would have put her father or her sons at risk. It is possible that she planned to divorce Tiberius, and make Iullus Antonius protector of her sons.

The scandal finally broke in 2 BC. When Augustus took action on his daughter Julia's copious promiscuity, Antonius was exposed as her prominent lover. The other men accused of adultery with Julia were exiled, but Iullus was not so lucky. He was charged with treason and sentenced to death; subsequently, he killed himself. Modern scholars have speculated that Iullus Antonius is one of the figures represented on the north face of the Ara Pacis, a Roman altar.

=== Children ===
His children with Claudia Marcella:

- Iullus Antonius (Note: Some question the inscription cited to be of Iullus Minor and believe it belongs to a different family, but the boy's existence can also be inferred from an inscription which describes Iullus as "Iullus pater".)
- Lucius Antonius
- Iulla Antonia

He likely had at least two step-children; Vipsania (married to Varus) and Vipsania (married to Lepidus) from his marriage to Marcella.

== Iullus in popular culture ==
Iullus is portrayed in many modern literature and television adaptations in a variety of ways. Many modern writers portray him as a womanizer and stress the relationship between him and Julia, be it political or romantic.

=== Literature ===
- In I, Claudius, a novel by Robert Graves
  - Briefly mentioned as being Julia's current lover at the time of her exile. He is the only one forced to commit suicide because Augustus could not stand the thought of his daughter and Mark Antony's son together.
- In I Loved Tiberius, a novel by Elisabeth Dored
  - Iullus and his sister Antonia Major are Julia's best friends throughout the novel. After Tiberius retires to Rhodes, Iullus admits to Julia that he's in love with her. It is unclear whether they have a sexual relationship.
- In Augustus: A Novel by John Williams
  - Iullus is honourable; he admires Augustus at first and hates his father Mark Antony. However, after falling in love with Julia, he plots to have Tiberius murdered in order to free her from her marriage when Augustus does not grant a divorce.
- In Caesar's Daughter, a novel by Edward Burton
  - Iullus is ambitious but loyal to the Julian family, and secretly wishes to marry Julia. He pursues Julia sexually and tries to convince her help him murder Tiberius. Subsequently, Iullus and his political friends are all accused of conspiring against Tiberius and Augustus, and Iullus is accused of adultery with Julia.
- In Augustus and Tiberius, novels by Allan Massie
  - Iullus is described as cruel, spiteful and full of hate without a trace of goodness. In Augustus, he eggs Julia on with her adulteries and plots to murder both Augustus and Tiberius, and marry Julia. In Tiberius, he confides in Tiberius that he wishes to marry Julia.

=== Drama ===
- In the British/Italian miniseries, Imperium: Augustus
  - Iullus was portrayed by Juan Diego Botto as the handsome, ambitious son of Mark Antony, who wants revenge for his father's death. However, after falling in love with Julia, he is pressured into treason by Cornelius Scipio. He is executed by Tiberius, by right of the Lex Iulia. He plays a major role in the film, being the driving force behind a plot to assassinate Augustus.
- In the BBC Television miniseries, I, Claudius
  - Iullus Antonius is oddly absent from the tale. When Julia is accused of having her affairs, Iullus Antonius' name is not mentioned. Historically, Iullus was Julia's most famous and noted lover. The discovery of their affair both shocked and humiliated Julia's father, Augustus. However, Julia's other alleged lovers were also unmentioned in the series.
- Iullus is portrayed in the 2021 mini series Domina as a frustrated and somewhat overlooked member of the Augustan Imperial family. He is the long-standing secret love interest of his cousin Julia, both forced to marry other partners by Augustus and his powerful wife Livia (who is the Domina, or Lady, of the series)

== See also ==
- Sex scandal

== Notes ==
Political offices
Preceded by Quintus Aelius Tubero; Paullus Fabius Maximus	Roman consul 10 BC with Africanus Fabius Maximus	Succeeded by Nero Claudius Drusus; T. Quinctius Crispinus Sulpicianus
