= Vipsania gens =

Ancient Roman family

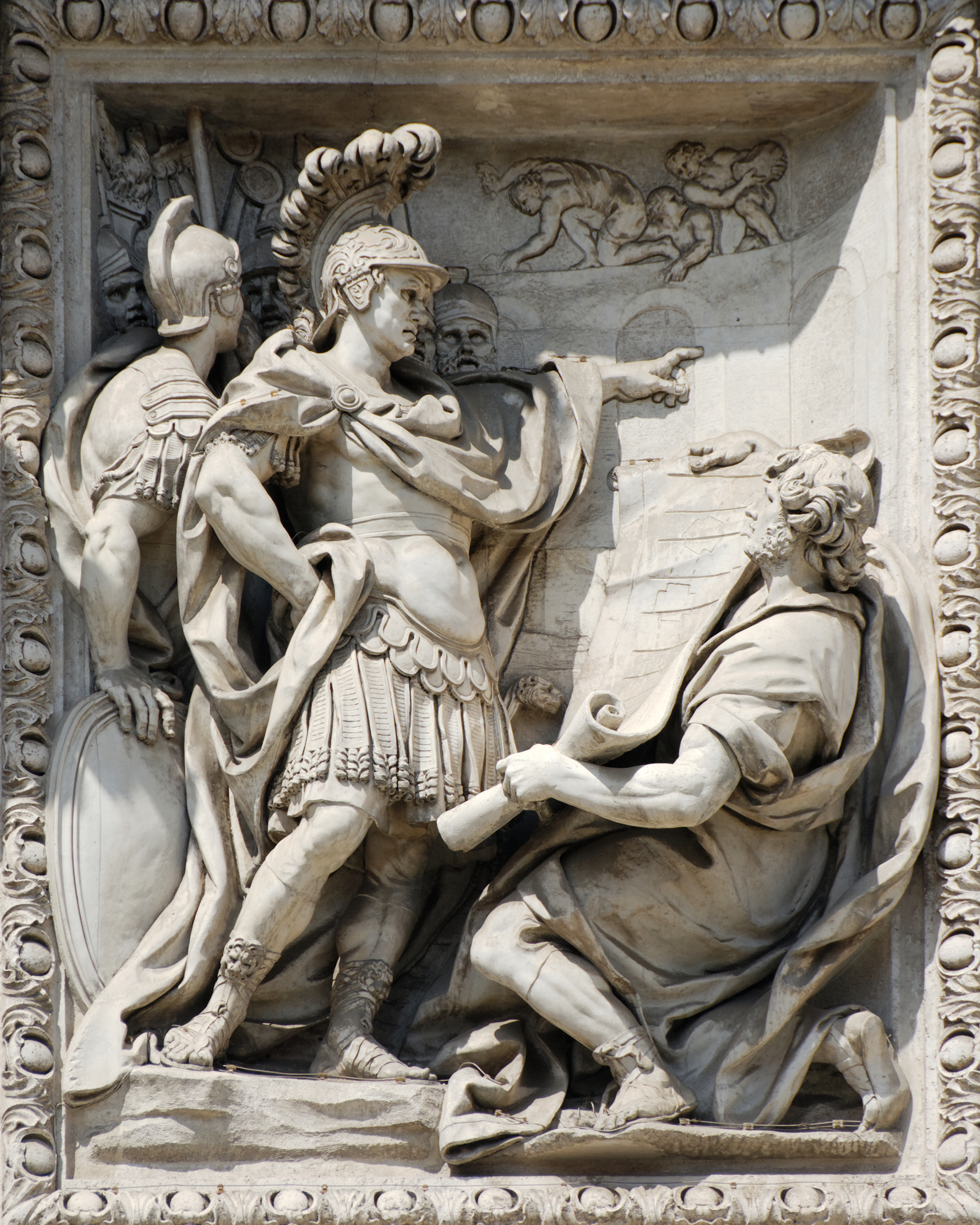
Marcus Vipsanius Agrippa approves the construction of the Aqua Virgo.

The gens Vipsania or Vipsana was an obscure plebeian family of equestrian rank at ancient Rome. Few members of this gens appear in history, although a number are known from inscriptions. By far the most illustrious of the family was Marcus Vipsanius Agrippa, a close friend and adviser of Augustus, whom the emperor intended to make his heir. After Agrippa died, Augustus adopted his friend's sons, each of whom was considered a possible heir to the Empire, but when each of them died or proved unsuitable, Augustus chose another heir, the future emperor Tiberius.

== Origin ==
The Vipsanii are not mentioned in history until the very end of the Republic. Their nomen, Vipsanius, resembles other gentilicia ending in -anius, which were typically derived from place names or cognomina ending in -anus. Several inscriptions give the name as Vipsanus, perhaps the original form of the nomen. According to some scholars, the gens Vipsania was originally from Pisae in Etruria.

== Praenomina ==
The only praenomina associated with the main family of the Vipsanii were Lucius and Marcus, two of the most common names throughout Roman history. Vipsanii named Gaius, Publius, Quintus, Sextus, and Titus are known from inscriptions and coins.

== Branches and cognomina ==
Only one distinct family of the Vipsanii appears in history, with the cognomen Agrippa. This was originally a praenomen, used by a few families of the early Republic, including the patrician Furii and Menenii, but by the end of the Republic it seems to have been used exclusively as a cognomen. Its origin and meaning were obscure even in antiquity; the most familiar explanation was that it was one of many praenomina derived from the circumstances of childbirth, and referred to a child delivered feet-first. (Note: This is the explanation given by Pliny, and followed by a number of other ancient authors. Modern scholars are skeptical of this explanation; Chase suggests that the name was borrowed from Greek, and was a compound name based on αγρός and ἵππος, thus making the definition something like "field horse". The Romans then adapted it to resemble their own names. However, in this case one would expect the Latin form to be Agrippus, and while the Romans did occasionally use surnames of Greek origin, the earliest examples seem to date to the fourth century BC; and Agrippa would be unique as a praenomen of Greek origin.)

== Members ==
This list includes abbreviated praenomina. For an explanation of this practice, see filiation.

- Lucius Vipsanius, the father of Marcus Vipsanius Agrippa.
- Lucius Vipsanius L. f., the brother of Marcus Agrippa, served under Cato the Younger against Caesar during the Civil War.
- Vipsania L. f. Polla, the sister of Marcus Agrippa, completed the Porticus Vipsania after her brother's death.
- Marcus Vipsanius, a man mentioned by Suetonius who criticised the language of the Aeneid, and called Vergil a bastard of Maecenas. Some identify this individual as the general Marcus Agrippa. (Note: The exact name and identity of this individual subject to controversy. Marcus Agrippa personally disliked being referred to by his obscure nomen gentilicium Vipsanius and avoided its use. It would also have been odd to mention him without including his best well known name Agrippa. Donatus' Vita 44 says M. Vipranius, but it is widely assumed to be a corruption in the text, and is nearly always corrected to Vipsanius. The name Vipranius is otherwise unattested. Harry Jocelyn disagreed with majority opinion, and asserted that the original is correct. Oliver Lyne agreed with Jocelyn's article, underscoring that the individual's name should not be amended to "Vipsanius", nor should he be identified with Agrippa. P. T. Eden disagreed with Jocelyn that the name should not be amended, but held that it was unlikely that Agrippa would have expressed himself with such technical terms (worthy of Quintilian) on poetry, and that if it was actually Agrippa, then he probably derived his opinion from Quintus Caecilius Epirota, who was the first to lecture on Vergil. Nicholas Horsfall has pointed out that Agrippa is not the only Vipsanius with whom it is possible to identify the critic. For example, an otherwise unknown grammarian Vipsanius is mentioned by Isidore of Seville; but Horsfall emphasizes, in contrast to Eden, that Agrippa was not an unlettered man. On the other hand, he notes that Agrippa probably would not jeer at Vergil for having been enfranchised by Maecenas, since he himself was elevated from an obscure family, and would be unlikely to draw attention to it by this kind of comment. Gian Biagio Conte shares Horsfall's opinion, and regards an identification with the grammarian as possible. Peter White also opined that this Vipsanius should probably not be assumed to be the general Agrippa, but perhaps instead with the grammarian, as the general disliked using his nomen.)
- Marcus Vipsanius Atticus, a rhetorician of the first century BC, sometimes conjectured to be the son of Agrippa.
- Marcus Vipsanius Gallicanus, a grandson of one of Augustus' freedmen.
- Marcus Vipsanius M. l. Clemens, freedman and impostor of Agrippa Postumus.
- Vipsanius Laenas, governor of Sardinia, was condemned in AD 56 on a charge of repetundae, maladministration of his province.

=== Vipsanii Agrippae ===
- Marcus Vipsanius L. f. Agrippa, the friend and trusted lieutenant of Augustus, distinguished himself in the Perusine War, against the Chatti, Sextus Pompeius, and at the Battle of Actium. He was consul in 37, 28, and 27 BC, and as aedile in 33 and subsequently repaired and constructed a number of important public works. His first wife was Attica, the daughter of Titus Pomponius Atticus; about 28 BC he married Augustus' niece, Marcella, and in 21 the emperor had him divorce Marcella and marry his daughter, Julia. He died unexpectedly in 12 BC.
- Vipsania M. f. L. n., a daughter of Agrippa by his first wife, Attica, married Quintus Haterius.
- Vipsania M. f. L. n. Agrippina, a daughter of Agrippa by his first wife, Attica. Her first husband was Tiberius Claudius Nero, by whom she became the mother of Drusus, but Augustus ordered their divorce, so that Tiberius could marry Julia. Vipsania then married Gaius Asinius Gallus, consul in 8 BC.
- Vipsania M. f. L. n. Marcella, a daughter of Agrippa by his second wife, Marcella, married Publius Quinctilius Varus.
- Vipsania M. f. L. n. Marcella, a daughter of Agrippa by his second wife, Marcella, married Marcus Aemilius Lepidus.
- Gaius Vipsanius M. f. L. n. Agrippa, the elder son of Agrippa and Julia, was adopted by Augustus in his father's lifetime, becoming Gaius Julius Caesar. He was consul in AD 1, together with his brother-in-law, Lucius Aemilius Paullus, but was already in Asia, where he remained to oppose the Parthians. He was wounded while taking possession of Armenia, and never fully recovered, dying at Limyra in Lycia in AD 4.
- Vipsania M. f. L. n. Julia, the elder daughter of Agrippa and Julia, commonly known as Julia the Younger, married Lucius Aemilius Paullus, consul in AD 1. She may have been the inspiration for the Corinna of Ovid's Amores. In AD 8, she was banished to the island of Tremerus, ostensibly for an affair with the senator Decimus Junius Silanus, but possibly because her husband had conspired against the emperor. She died in exile in 28.
- Lucius Vipsanius M. f. L. n. Agrippa, the second son of Agrippa and Julia, was adopted in infancy by Augustus, becoming Lucius Julius Caesar. He and his brother, Gaius, were meant to be the emperor's heirs, but Lucius died at Massilia in AD 2, while traveling to Spain, and his brother died in AD 4, leaving Augustus to choose between their younger brother, Marcus, and his son-in-law, Tiberius.
- Vipsania M. f. L. n. Julia Agrippina, or Agrippina the Elder, the younger daughter of Agrippa and Julia, married Germanicus, the nephew and intended heir of Tiberius, but after his death in AD 19, she was regarded with suspicion by the emperor, who banished her and her two elder sons, Nero and Drusus, to the Pontine Islands, where they died. Her third son, Gaius, succeeded Tiberius; her daughter, Agrippina, was the fourth wife of Claudius and the mother of Nero.
- Marcus Vipsanius M. f. L. n. Agrippa Postumus, (Note: The name Postumus, originally a praenomen, like Agrippa, is derived from the adjective postremus, last or hindmost, and was originally given to last-born children; but by confusion with post humus, after burial, came to be applied to children born after their fathers' death. Since the two meanings often coincided, the distinction in this case may be academic, but in this instance the name seems to have been given because Marcus was born after his father's death.) the youngest son of Agrippa and Julia, was born after his father's death in 12 BC, and adopted by Augustus in AD 4, becoming Marcus Julius Caesar Agrippa Postumus. He was later banished to the island of Planasia on account of his violent temperament. There he was murdered after the accession of Tiberius, in order to forestall any possibility of a revolt in his name.
- Publius Vipsanius Agrippa, duumvir of Corinth during the reign of Caligula. Possibly a member of Marcus Agrippa's family.

=== Vipsanii from inscriptions ===
- Marcus Vipsanius Lamyrus, a little boy buried at Rome, aged four, in a tomb dating to the latter half of the first century BC.
- Marcus Vipsanius Longinus, buried at Rome, aged thirty, in a tomb dating to the latter half of the first century BC.
- Vipsania M. M. l. Acume, a freedwoman of Agrippa.
- Marcus Vipsanius Agrippae l. Antiochus Sittianus, a freedman of Agrippa, buried at Rome in a sepulchre built by Flavia Acme for herself, Antiochus, and Marcus Vipsanius Troilus.
- Marcus Vipsanius Fortunatus, perhaps a freedman of Agrippa, received a pot from Astracalus, Agrippa's lapidarius, or jeweler.
- Vipsania Agrippae l. Martha, a freedwoman of Agrippa.
- Marcus Vipsanius Salvius, perhaps a freedman of Agrippa, received a pot from Astracalus.
- Vipsania M. l. Stibas, a freedwoman of the household of Agrippa, for whom Marcus Vipsanius Zoticus dedicated several pots at Rome.
- Marcus Vipsanius M. l. Zoticus, a freedman of the household of Marcus Vipsanius Agrippa, dedicated a series of pots at Rome for himself and his conliberta, Vipsania Stibas.
- Marcus Vipsanius Agrippae l. Troilus Sittianus, a freedman of Agrippa, buried in a sepulchre built by Flavia Acme for herself, Troilus, and Marcus Vipsanius Antiochus.
- Marcus Vipsanius, buried at Rome in the late first century BC, or early first century AD.
- Vipsania Ɔ. l. Cyclas, a freedwoman buried at Rome, in a tomb dating to the late first century BC, or early first century AD.
- Marcus Vipsanus Macedo, mentioned in an inscription from Rome, naming his "brother", Cyrus, dating from the late first century BC, or early first century AD.
- Marcus Vipsanius M. l. Nedymo, a freedman named in an inscription from Rome, dating to the late first century BC, or early first century AD.
- Vipsania Fructa, dedicated a tomb at Rome for her sister, Vipsania Jucunda, dating to the late first century BC, or the early first century AD.
- Marcus Vipsanius Hilarus, the patron of Lais, a freedwoman, who dedicated a monument in his honour, dating to the late first century BC, or the early first century AD.
- Vipsania Jucunda, buried at Rome, aged twelve, with a monument from her sister, Vipsania Fructa, dating to the late first century BC, or early first century AD.
- Marcus Vipsanius Calamus, one of the tentori, or animal handlers, at the estate of Titus Attius Capito, named in an inscription dating from the reign of Augustus.
- Marcus Vipsanius Dareus, one of the tentori of Titus Attius Capito.
- Marcus Vipsanius Faustus, one of the charioteers of Titus Attius Capito.
- Marcus Vipsanius Micio Docimus, the steward of Titus Attius Capito's estate.
- Sextus Vipsanius M. f. Clemens, one of the magistrates at Verona in Venetia and Histria in 1 BC.
- Marcus Vipsanius Narcissus, apparently an actor who had fallen on hard times, and become a rogator, or beggar, according to an early first-century inscription from Rome.
- Marcus Vipsanius Papa, a freedman of Agrippina.
- Marcus Vipsanius Thales, a freedman of Agrippina, together with his foster-brother, Chryses, dedicated a tomb at Rome for the latter's brother Celeris, the son of Gallus, dating to the early first century.
- Vipsanius Novellus, dedicated a tomb at Cirta in Numidia, dating between the reign of Augustus and the reign of Trajan, for Crescensgentia, the daughter of Cristenus, aged two.
- Vipsania Fausta, dedicated a tomb at Rome for Tiberius Julius Antiochus, dating to the final years of Augustus.
- Marcus Vipsanius, a freedman of Agrippa or perhaps Agrippina, named in an inscription from Rome, along with Antistia Fac[...], dating from the first half of the first century.
- Marcus Vipsanius, named in a sepulchral inscription from Aquileia in Venetia and Histria, dating from the first half of the first century.
- Vipsania M. l. Eucalio, a freedwoman, named along with her mother, Vipsania Rufa, in an inscription from Rome, dating to the first half of the first century.
- Vipsania M. Ɔ. l. Fortunata, a freedwoman named in an inscription from Rome, dating from the first half of the first century.
- Marcus Vipsanius Sp. f. Gallicanus, the grandson of Gaius Julius Libanus, a freedman of the emperor, was buried at Rome, aged thirty-five, in a tomb dating to the first half of the first century.
- Vipsania Hilara, dedicated a tomb at Rome for her husband, Vipsanius Spinther, dating from the first half of the first century.
- Marcus Vipsanius Isochrysus, a boy buried at Rome, aged eight years, two months, and eighteen days, in a tomb dating from the first half of the first century.
- Vipsanius Marius, named in a sepulchral inscription from Rome, dating from the first half of the first century.
- Vipsanius Musaeus, the former master of Vipsania Thalassa.
- Vipsania M. l. Rufa, a freedwoman, named along with her daughter, Vipsania Eucalio, in an inscription from Rome dating to the first half of the first century.
- Vipsanius Spinther, buried at Rome in a tomb dedicated by his wife, Vipsania Hilara, dating to the first half of the first century.
- Vipsania Thalassa, the freedwoman of Vipsanius Musaeus, built a tomb in an uncertain province for herself and Tiberius Claudius Epictetus, a freedman of the emperor.
- Vipsania Urbana, named in an inscription from Rome, dating to the first half of the first century.
- Vipsania Psyllis, dedicated a monument at Rome for her husband, Seleucus, the freedman of Asinius Pollio, dating between AD 30 and 50.
- Marcus Vipsanius Primigenius, a bronze worker at Abellinum in Campania during the late first century BC, or early first century AD.
- Vipsanius, the owner of an estate at Fundi in Latium during the first half of the first century.
- Vipsania, buried in a first-century tomb at Salona in Dalmatia, along with Quintus Terentius Seleucianus.
- Marcus Vipsanius Alexander, named in a first-century inscription from Rome.
- Marcus Vipsanius Anoptes, buried in a first-century tomb at Rome.
- Vipsania M. l. Aucta, a freedwoman buried in a first-century tomb at Rome.
- Vipsanius Celer, dedicated a first-century tomb at Rome for his wife, Junia Sympherusa, aged twenty-three.
- Quintus Vipsanus Colonus, known from a first-century sepulchral inscription from Aquileia in Venetia and Histria.
- Marcus Vipsanius Dama, named in a first-century inscription from Ostia in Latium.
- Vipsania Euposia, the mother of Vipsania Fortunata, whom she buried in a first-century family sepulchre at Rome, along with Vipsania Philusa and Marcus Vipsanius Latinus.
- Vipsania Fortunata, the daughter of Vipsania Euposia, buried in a first-century family sepulchre at Rome, aged nineteen years, ten months, and ten hours, along with Vipsania Philusa and Marcus Vipsanius Latinus.
- Marcus Vipsanius Sex. f. Latinus, buried in a first-century family sepulchre at Rome, aged one, along with Vipsania Philusa and Vipsania Fortunata.
- Vipsania M. l. Philusa, buried in a first-century family sepulchre at Rome, aged twenty, along with Marcus Vipsanius Latinus and Vipsania Fortunata.
- Vipsania Quinta, buried in a first-century tomb at Simitthus in Africa Proconsularis, aged thirty-two.
- Marcus Vipsanius M. l. Ap[...], a freedman named in an inscription from Herculaneum, dating between AD 60 and 79.
- Vipsanius Eunus, buried at Rome, aged forty-five, in a tomb dedicated by his wife, dating from the reign of Domitian.
- Marcus Vipsanus M. l. Faustus, a freedman named in a dedicatory inscription from Flanona in Dalmatia, dating from the first century, or the first half of the second.
- Vipsanius Peregrinus, mentioned in an inscription from Casilinum in Campania, dating from the first century, or the first half of the second, had been quaestor and aedile.
- Marcus Vipsanius M. f. Secundus Melo, a soldier in the century of Lutatius, in the fifth cohort of the praetorian guard, was buried at Rome, aged twenty-seven, having served for nine years, in a tomb dating from the latter half of the first century, or the early part of the second.
- Vipsania M. f. Silana, built a sepulchre at Iader in Dalmatia, dating between the middle of the first century and the first half of the second, for her husband, the freedman Quintus Feresius Spiculus, and daughter, Feresia Tertulla, aged twenty-four.
- Vipsanius Marcellus, master of the slave Theseus, buried at Regium Julium in Bruttium, aged seventeen, in a tomb dating to the latter half of the first century.
- Marcus Vipsanius Clemens, made a substantial donation to a temple at Leptis Magna in Africa Proconsularis during the late first century.
- Vipsanius Felix, dedicated a late first- or early second-century tomb at Ostia for his freedman and his wife, Plaria Tyche.
- Vipsania Primigenia, buried at Rome in a family sepulchre dedicated by her husband, Titus Flavius Magnus, and dating to the late first or early second century.
- Vipsanius Atticus, buried at Catina in Sicilia, in a tomb dating to the latter half of the first century, or the first half of the second.
- Vipsania M. f. Priscilla, a woman buried at Neviodunum in Pannonia Superior, along with her husband, Quintus Annaeus Crispus, aged seventy, and son, Annaeus Colonus, aged fifteen, in a tomb dedicated by her son, Quintus Annaeus Verus, dating to the late first century, or the first half of the second.
- Lucius Vipsanus Secundus, dedicated a tomb at Aequum Tuticum in Samnium, dating from the late first century, or the first half of the second, for his wife, Veneria, and their family.
- Vipsania Atticilla, buried at Augusta Emerita in Lusitania, aged twenty-eight, with a monument from her husband, Marcus Ulpius Lupus, a freedman of the emperor.
- Marcus Vipsanus Daphnus, buried in a second-century tomb at Rome, dedicated by his daughter, Cornelia.
- Marcus Vipsanius Nerva, dedicated a tomb at Rome for his freedman, Quartus, dating from the second century, or the latter half of the first.
- Titus Vipsanius Q. f. Fortunatus, the father of Quintia Tertulla, with whom he dedicated a tomb at Aufinum in Sabinum for his wife, Quintia Exoce, dating between the late first and early third centuries.
- Vipsania Capriola, the nurse of Vipsania Severa, for whom she dedicated a second-century tomb at Teate Marrucinorum in Sabinum, together with Vipsanius Valens, Severa's maternal uncle.
- Marcus Vipsanius Eucdemus, made a second-century offering to Isis at Narbo in Gallia Narbonensis.
- Marcus Vipsanius Felix, buried in a sepulchre at Portus in Latium, dating to the middle of the second century, along with Marcus Ulpius Philetus, Titus Flavius Agathemer, and Titus Flavius Onesimus.
- Vipsania Fortunata, buried at Ostia in a second-century tomb dedicated by her husband, Vipsanius Menophas.
- Vipsanius Menophas, dedicated a second-century tomb at Ostia for his wife, Vipsania Fortunata.
- Marcus Vipsanius Polybius, one of the patrons of the college of beam-makers at Luna in Etruria, named in a second-century inscription.
- Vipsania Severa, buried in a second-century tomb at Teate Marrucinorum, dedicated by her maternal uncle, Vipsanius Valens, and nurse, Vipsania Capriola.
- Vipsanius Valens, dedicated a second-century tomb at Teate Marrucinorum for his sister's daughter, Vipsania Severa, together with the girl's nurse, Vipsania Capriola.
- Marcus Paconius L. f. Vipsanius Proculus, one of the aediles, made a donation to the temple of the Genius of the Roman colony at Lilybaeum, dating to the latter half of the second century.
- Gaius Vipsanius Victor, a soldier in the ninth cohort of the Legio III Augusta, stationed at Lambaesis in Numidia, according to an inscription dating from AD 173.
- Lucius Cominius Vipsanius Salutaris, governor of Hispania Baetica in AD 195, during the reign of Septimius Severus.
- Servilia Vipsania Quieta, a woman buried at Rome, aged sixty-five years, five months, and one day, in a tomb dedicated by her son, Menander, dating to the late second century, or the first half of the third.
- Vipsania Censoria, buried at Burdigala in Gallia Aquitania, in a tomb dating from the first half of the third century.
- Lucius Vipsanius Marcellus, buried at Epetium in Dalmatia, in a tomb dedicated by his cousin, Vipsanius Lupus, and dating to the third century, or the latter half of the second.
- Vipsania Lupa, buried at Epetium in a tomb dedicated by her son, Vivius Hyla, and dating to the third century, or the latter half of the second.
- Vipsania Casta, dedicated a second- or third-century tomb at Rome for her friend, Tituenus Aprilis, a soldier in the twelfth Urban Cohort, in the century of Rufus, a veteran of eighteen years.
- Marcus Vipsanius Felix, buried at Rome, aged thirty, in a second- or third-century tomb dedicated by his wife, Alcime.
- Vipsania Lesbia, buried in a second- or third-century tomb at Rome.
- Vipsanius Lupus, dedicated a second- or third-century tomb at Epetium for his cousin, Lucius Vipsanius Marcellus.
- Vipsanius Primitivus, named in a second- or third-century sepulchral inscription from Rome.
- Vipsanius Marcellinus, dedicated a tomb in Dalmatia for his mother, Garinia Marcellina, dating to the third century, or the latter half of the second.
- Lucius Vipsanius L. f. Valens, buried at Salona, aged forty-seven, in a tomb dedicated by his wife, Baebidia Balbina, and son, Lucius Vipsanius Valens, dating from the third century, or the latter half of the second.
- Lucius Vipsanius L. f. L. n. Valens, along with his mother, Baebidia Balbina, dedicated a tomb at Salona to his father, also named Lucius Vipsanius Valens.
- Marcus Vipsanius Primulus, a soldier in the fifth cohort of the vigiles at Rome in AD 210, serving in the century of Verinus.
- Marcus Vipsanius Felix, a soldier in the fifth cohort of the vigiles in AD 210, serving in the century of Verinus.
- Marcus Vipsanius Syriacus, a soldier in the fifth cohort of the vigiles in AD 210, serving in the century of Romulus.
- Vipsanius Caecilianus Axius, fiscal procurator for the province of Asia around the reign of Macrinus and Diadumenian.
- Cominia L. f. Vipsania Dignitas, a woman of senatorial rank, named in an early third-century inscription concerning the priest of Diana at Allifae.
- Vipsania L. f. Maxima, buried at Emporium Piretensium in Moesia Inferior, aged thirty-five, in a tomb dedicated by her mother, Visentia Modesta, and brothers Vipsanius Clemens, Vipsanius Valens, Vipsanius Martialis, Vipsanius Modestus, and Vipsanius Fronto, dating to the first half of the third century.
- Vipsanius L. f. Clemens, the son of Visentia Modesta, was a soldier in the Legio VII Claudia. Together with his mother and his brothers, Vipsanius Valens, Vipsanius Martialis, Vipsanius Modestus, and Vipsanius Fronto, he dedicated a third-century tomb at Emporium Piretensium for their sister, Vipsania Maxima.
- Vipsanius L. f. Fronto, the son of Visentia Modesta, along with whom he and his brothers, Vipsanius Clemens, Vipsanius Valens, Vipsanius Martialis, and Vipsanius Modestus, dedicated a tomb at Emporium Piretensium for their sister, Vipsania Maxima.
- Vipsanius L. f. Martialis, the son of Visentia Modesta, along with whom he and his brothers, Vipsanius Clemens, Vipsanius Valens, Vipsanius Modestus, and Vipsanius Fronto, dedicated a tomb at Emporium Piretensium for their sister, Vipsania Maxima.
- Vipsanius L. f. Modestus, the son of Visentia Modesta, along with whom he and his brothers, Vipsanius Clemens, Vipsanius Valens, Vipsanius Martialis, and Vipsanius Fronto, dedicated a tomb at Emporium Piretensium for their sister, Vipsania Maxima.
- Vipsanius L. f. Valens, the son of Visentia Modesta, along with whom he and his brothers, Vipsanius Clemens, Vipsanius Martialis, Vipsanius Modestus, and Vipsanius Fronto, dedicated a tomb at Emporium Piretensium for their sister, Vipsania Maxima.
- Vipsana Surilla, the daughter of Clodius Gallicanus, with whom she dedicated a third-century tomb at Pharia in Dalmatia for her mother, Clodia Severa.
- Lucius Vipsanius L. f. Silvanus, buried at Cirta in a tomb dedicated by his son, Lucius Vipsanius Silvanus, dating to the mid-third century.
- Lucius Vipsanius L. f. L. n. Silvanus, dedicated a third-century tomb at Cirta for his father, also named Lucius Vipsanius Silvanus.
- Vipsanius Terentius, dedicated a third-century tomb at Aequum in Dalmatia for his wife, Aurelia Victorina, aged twenty-three, with whom he had lived for nine years and five months.

=== Undated Vipsanii ===
- Marcus Vipsanus, named in a sepulchral inscription from Rome.
- Marcus Vipsanius Alexander, a little boy buried at Rome, aged three, along with Vipsania Felicula, aged twenty-two.
- Marcus Vipsanius Amerimnus, named in a bronze inscription from Potentia in Lucania.
- Marcus Vipsanius M. l. Athen[...], a freedman named in an inscription from Rome.
- Vipsania Charis, daughter of the freedwoman Vipsania Hilara, who dedicated a sepulchre at Rome for her, and for her patron, Marcus Vipsanius Ilissus.
- Marcus Vipsanius Clemens, named in an inscription from Verona, along with Titus Vipsanius Cteso and Lucius Vipsanius Lucanus.
- Marcus Vipsanius Cnismus, buried at Rome.
- Titus Vipsanius Cteso, named in an inscription from Verona, along with Marcus Vipsanius Clemens and Lucius Vipsanius Lucanus.
- Marcus Vipsanius Donatus, an artisan whose maker's mark was found at Rome.
- Marcus Vipsanius M. l. Donatus, a freedman buried at Rome, along with Marcus Vipsanius Plebeius, probably his infant son, and the latter's mother, Tonneia Nike.
- Vipsania M. l. Erotis, a freedwoman named in an inscription from Rome.
- Vipsania Fahena, together with Gaius Julius Seranus, made an offering to the goddess of Octocannabus at Gelduba in Germania Inferior.
- Marcus Vipsanius Faustus, a little boy buried at Rome, aged three.
- Vipsania Felicula, buried at Rome, aged twenty-two, along with a little boy, Marcus Vipsanius Alexander.
- Vipsanius Firmus, a little boy buried at Patavium in Venetia and Histria, aged three, in a tomb dedicated by his parents, Vipsanius Longinus and Julia Faustina.
- Vipsanius Fortunatus, dedicated a tomb at Rome for his freedman, Cerdo.
- Vipsania Galene, dedicated a tomb at Ostia for her son, Marcus Ulpius Fortis, aged twenty-four years, eight months, and two days.
- Vipsania P. f. Glypte, the daughter of Publius Strabonius Primigenius and Munia Trophime, and brother of Publius Strabonius Eutychus, buried at Rome in a family sepulchre built by her father.
- Vipsania Hedone, named in an inscription from Rome.
- Marcus Vipsanius Herma, an artisan whose maker's mark was found at Rome.
- Vipsania Hilara, a freedwoman who dedicated a sepulchre at Rome for her patron, Marcus Vipsanius Ilissus, and daughter, Vipsania Charis.
- Marcus Vipsanius Ilissus, patron of the freedwoman Vipsania Hilara, who dedicated a sepulchre at Rome for him, and for her daughter, Vipsania Charis.
- Marcus Vipsanius Isthmidius, built a sepulchre at Rome for himself and his wife Julia Autodice.
- Marcus Vipsanius Januarius, a youth buried at Rome, aged fourteen.
- Vipsania M. f. Julia, a woman buried at Thibilis in Numidia, aged twenty-one.
- Vipsanius Longinus, the husband of Julia Faustina, and father of Vipsanius Firmus, a little boy buried at Patavium.
- Lucius Vipsanius Lucanus, named in an inscription from Verona, together with Titus Vipsanius Cteso and Marcus Vipsanius Clemens.
- Marcus Vipsanius Lupulus, together with Licinia Victoria, dedicated a family sepulchre at Rome for themselves and Lupulus' grandson, also named Marcus Vipsanius Lupulus.
- Marcus Vipsanius M. n. Lupulus, an infant buried at Rome, aged one year, forty days, in a family sepulchre built by his grandfather, also named Marcus Vipsanius Lupulus, and Licinia Victoria.
- Marcus Vipsanius M. f. Martialis, a priest of Saturn buried at Thibilis.
- Vipsania M. f. Maxima, a girl buried at Thibilis, aged thirteen.
- Marcus Vipsanius Moschus, buried at Rome, aged forty, in a tomb dedicated by his brother, Marcus Vipsanius Philoxenus.
- Marcus Vipsanius Nien[...], dedicated a tomb at Rome for his sister-in-law, Fo[...].
- Vipsania Nymphe, buried at Utica in Africa Proconsularis, aged sixty-nine.
- Marcus Vipsanius Philoxenus, dedicated a tomb at Rome for his brother, Marcus Vipsanius Moschus.
- Marcus Vipsanius M. f. Plebeius, probably the son of the freedman Marcus Vipsanius Donatus, was buried at Rome, aged one year, six months, along with his mother, Tonneia Nike.
- Vipsania Primilla, dedicated a tomb at Portus to her nurseling, Gaius Vipsanius Saturninus.
- Marcus Vipsanius M. M. l. Princeps, a freedman buried at Rome.
- Gaius Vipsanius M. f. Reginus, a youth buried at Thibilis, aged sixteen.
- Vipsania Repentina, a woman buried at Carthage in Africa Proconsularis, aged thirty-three.
- Gaius Vipsanius Saturninus, a little boy buried at Portus, aged four years, four months, and eight days, in a tomb dedicated by his nurse, Vipsania Primilla.
- Vipsania Soteris, a household servant buried at Rome, was the mother of Ialysus and Asmectus.
- Vipsania Tertia, a woman named in an inscription found at the site of modern Pisoniano in Latium, along with Vibius Pumidius Rusticus.
- Publius Vipsanius Trophimus, the husband of Claudia Aphrodite, and father of Gnaeus Domitius Artemo, a little boy buried at Rome, aged three years, five months, and twelve days.
- Quintus Vipsanius Q. f. Urbanus, an elderly man buried at Thibilis, aged one hundred.
- Quintus Vipsanius Q. f. Urbanus, a boy buried at Thibilis, aged seven.

== See also ==
- List of Roman gentes

== Bibliography ==
- Titus Livius (Livy), History of Rome.
- Marcus Velleius Paterculus, Compendium of Roman History.
- Gaius Plinius Secundus (Pliny the Elder), Historia Naturalis (Natural History).
- Publius Cornelius Tacitus, Annales.
- Gaius Suetonius Tranquillus, De Vita Caesarum (Lives of the Caesars, or The Twelve Caesars).
- Lucius Annaeus Florus, Epitome de T. Livio Bellorum Omnium Annorum DCC (Epitome of Livy: All the Wars of Seven Hundred Years).
- Appianus Alexandrinus (Appian), Bellum Civile (The Civil War).
- Aulus Gellius, Noctes Atticae (Attic Nights).
- Lucius Cassius Dio Cocceianus (Cassius Dio), Roman History.
- Gaius Julius Solinus, De Mirabilis Mundi (On the Wonders of the World).
- Maurus Servius Honoratus (Servius), Ad Virgilii Aeneidem Commentarii (Commentary on Vergil's Aeneid).
- Nonius Marcellus, De Compendiosa Doctrina (On Collected Knowledge).
- Joannes Zonaras, Epitome Historiarum (Epitome of History).
- Dictionary of Greek and Roman Biography and Mythology, William Smith, ed., Little, Brown and Company, Boston (1849).
- Theodor Mommsen et alii, Corpus Inscriptionum Latinarum (The Body of Latin Inscriptions, abbreviated CIL), Berlin-Brandenburgische Akademie der Wissenschaften (1853–present).
- Bullettino della Commissione Archeologica Comunale in Roma (Bulletin of the Municipal Archaeological Commission of Rome, abbreviated BCAR), (1872–present).
- Notizie degli Scavi di Antichità (News of Excavations from Antiquity, abbreviated NSA), Accademia dei Lincei (1876–present).
- Bulletin Archéologique du Comité des Travaux Historiques et Scientifiques (Archaeological Bulletin of the Committee on Historic and Scientific Works), Imprimerie Nationale, Paris (1885–1973).
- René Cagnat et alii, L'Année épigraphique (The Year in Epigraphy, abbreviated AE), Presses Universitaires de France (1888–present).
- George Davis Chase, "The Origin of Roman Praenomina", in Harvard Studies in Classical Philology, vol. VIII, pp. 103–184 (1897).
- Stéphane Gsell, Inscriptions Latines de L'Algérie (Latin Inscriptions from Algeria), Edouard Champion, Paris (1922–present).
- Anna and Jaroslav Šašel, Inscriptiones Latinae quae in Iugoslavia inter annos MCMXL et MCMLX repertae et editae sunt (Inscriptions from Yugoslavia Found and Published between 1940 and 1960), Ljubljana (1963–1986).
- Meyer Reinhold, Marcus Agrippa: a Biography, L'Erma di Bretschneider (1965), ISBN 9788870624144.
- Veikko Väänänen, Le iscrizioni della necropoli dell'autoparco Vaticano (Inscriptions of the Vatican Parking Lot Necropolis), Rome (1973).
- Dietrich Boschung, Antike Grabaltäre aus den Nekropolen Roms (Ancient Grave Altars from the Roman Necropolis), Bern (1987).
- John Franklin Hall, Etruscan Italy: Etruscan Influences on the Civilizations of Italy from Antiquity to the Modern Era, Indiana University Press (1996), ISBN 9780842523349.
- David Ridgway, The World of the Early Etruscans, Paul Astrèoms Fèorlag, Stockholm (2002), ISBN 9789170811890.
- Atti del quarantesimo convegno di studi sulla Magna Grecia (Proceedings of the fortieth study conference on Magna Graecia), Taranto (2004).
- Giuseppe Camodeca, I ceti dirigenti di rango senatorio, equestre e decurionale della Campania Romana (The Ruling Classes of Senatorial, Equestrian, and Decurional Rank of Roman Campania), Naples (2008).
- Michel Christol, "Les procurateurs équestres de la province d’Asie sous Caracalla : autour de la carrière de L(ucius) Lucilius Pansa Priscillianus" (The equestrian procurators of the province of Asia under Caracalla: around the career of L(ucius) Lucilius Pansa Priscillianus), in L'Antiquité Classique, vol. 77, pp. 189–214 (2008).
- Manfred Clauss, Anne Kolb, & Wolfgang A. Slaby, Epigraphik Datenbank Clauss/Slaby.
