= Vipsania (wife of Haterius) =

1st century BC Roman noblewoman who married the orator Quintus Haterius

- Spouse: Quintus Haterius
- Children: Decimus Haterius Agrippa
- Parents: Marcus Vipsanius Agrippa (father); Pomponia Caecilia Attica (mother)

Vipsania (likely born between 36 and 28 BC) was an ancient Roman noblewoman of the first century BC. She was married to the orator Quintus Haterius and was likely the daughter of Roman general Marcus Vipsanius Agrippa and his first wife Pomponia Caecilia Attica.

== History ==
=== Early life ===
Vipsania is never directly referenced in surviving ancient Roman writing, but her existence can be inferred by her son's name, Decimus Haterius Agrippa, and his age. She has often been assumed to have been a daughter by her father's second wife Claudia Marcella Major, but Ronald Syme has rejected this theory, feeling that Decimus Agrippa was too old to have been the son of one of Marcella's daughters, thus she must have been born to Pomponia, her father's first wife. Syme has also argued that it is unlikely that a man of Haterius' stature would have been allowed to be honoured to the degree of marrying a grand-niece of Caesar Augustus. There are also those like Sabina Tariverdieva who believe that Haterius' wife was actually a sister of Agrippa, possibly his sister Vipsania Polla.

There has been some disagreement as to whether Vipsania was older or younger than her full sister Vipsania Agrippina (the wife of the future emperor Tiberius). If she was older, then her full name would possibly have been Vipsania Agrippina Major and if she was younger, Vipsania Agrippina Minor. Besides her full sister she also had several half siblings, Vipsania Marcella Major and Vipsania Marcella Minor from her father's second marriage, and Gaius Caesar, Lucius Caesar, Agrippina the Elder, Vipsania Julia and Agrippa Postumus from her father's third and last marriage to Julia the Elder (the daughter of emperor Caesar Augustus).

=== Marriage ===
By the time of Vipsania's marriage to Haterius he was far older than her and a novus homo (meaning that no other man in his family had ever been a consul before him). Their son was likely born around 13 BC. After their marriage it would be another 50 years before any novus homo would be married to a member of the Julio-Claudians.

== Cultural depictions ==
Vipsania and her husband may be depicted in the Ara Pacis.

== See also ==
- List of Roman women
- Women in ancient Rome
- Vipsania Marcella (disambiguation)
