= Agrenev =

Agrenev (Russian: Агренев; masculine) or Agreneva (Агренева; feminine) is a Russian last name. It derives from either the first name Agrikola (Latin for farmer) or Agrippa (after the Roman gens).

The following people shared this last name:

- Dmitry Agrenev-Slavyansky; see music of Azerbaijan
