= Iulla Antonia =

Grandniece of emperor Augustus and granddaughter of Mark Antony

- Parents: Iullus Antonius (father); Claudia Marcella Major (mother)
- Relatives: Octavia Minor, maternal grandmother
- Family: Julio-Claudian dynasty

Iulla Antonia or Antonia Iulla is thought to be a daughter of Roman consul of 10 BCE Iullus Antonius (son of Mark Antony) and Claudia Marcella Major (niece of emperor Augustus). The only direct evidence of her existence that has been found is a funerary urn. (Note: She must have survived infancy if a freedman set up an inscription about her.)

== History ==
Her mother likely had two daughters, Vipsania Marcella and Vipsania Marcellina from her earlier marriage to Marcus Vipsanius Agrippa. She is known to have had at least one full sibling, a brother named Lucius, and probably another brother named Iullus who might have died young. The name Iulla is generally presumed to have been her praenomen, but it is not certain, it could have been used as a cognomen instead.

Historian Ronald Syme notes that she has been used as an example to explain later descendants from Mark Antony among the Roman patricians of Imperial times, mainly that of a Junius Blaesus, a victim of Vitellius, this view was supported by G. V. Sumner. There has been some speculation that Iulla was actually Lucius Antonius' daughter, but this seems unlikely as he left Rome while young and it is improbable that he had fathered a child already. Christian Settipani, on the other hand, proposes Junius Blaesus as a descendant of Antonia Major's daughter Domitia and her husband Gaius Sallustius Crispus Passienus. It is possible that Iulla was allowed to stay in the city because she had already married an important man by the time of their fathers downfall, (as noble Roman women married before their male counterparts), or it is possible that the writing was created before Iullus was disgraced and if so then the epigraph could not be referring to a daughter of Lucius.

== Cultural depictions ==
Iulla may be depicted on the Ara Pacis with her parents. She and her brother Lucius appear in the novel Daughter of the Nile by Stephanie Dray.

== See also ==
- Plautia (mother of Aelius Caesar)
- List of Roman women
