= Lucius Antonius =

Lucius Antonius is a combination of praenomen and family name (nomen) used by ancient Roman men from a plebeian branch of the gens Antonia, including:

- Lucius Antonius (brother of Mark Antony)
- Lucius Antonius (grandson of Mark Antony) (20 BC–34)
