= Naming conventions for women in ancient Rome =

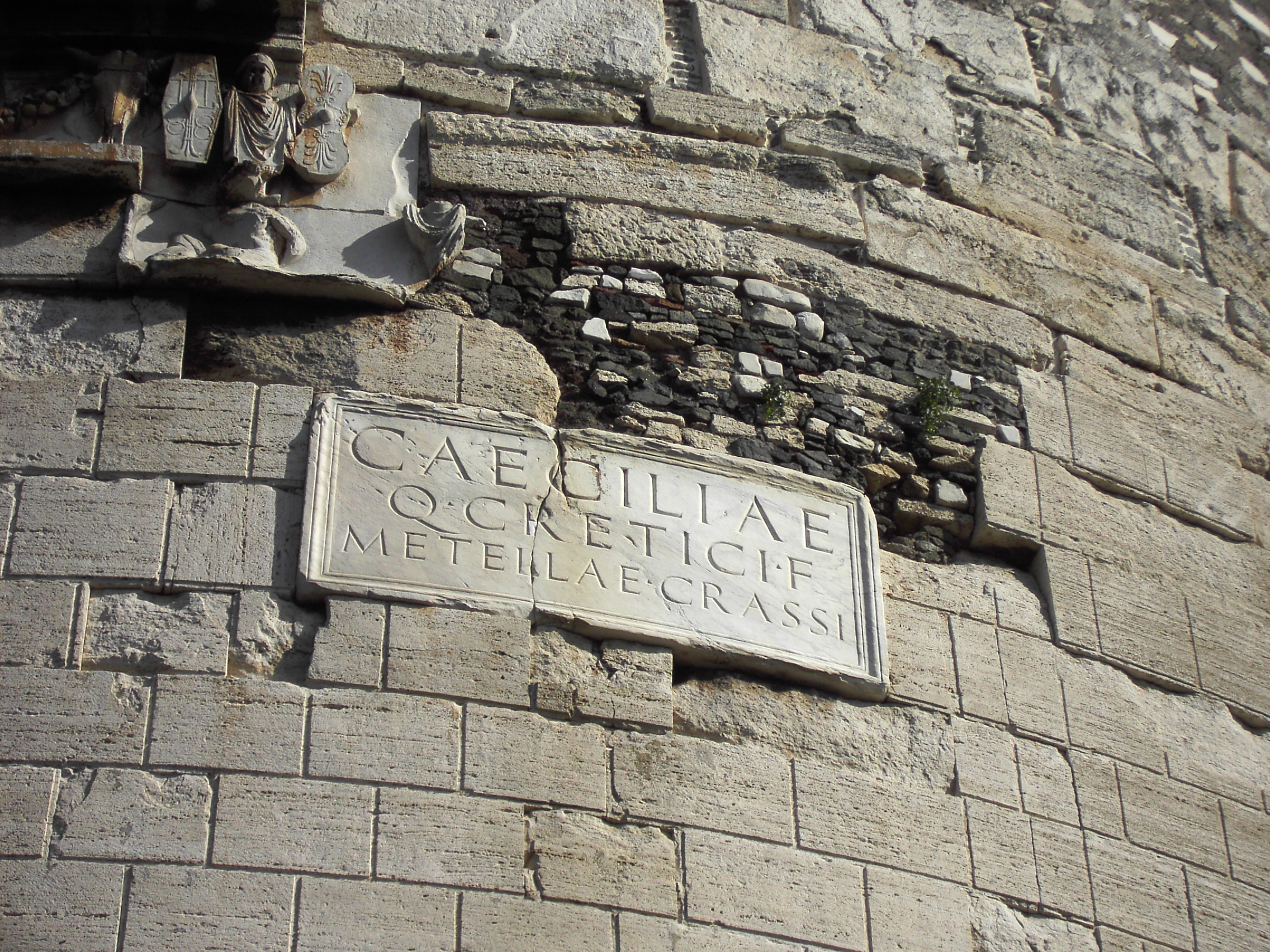
An inscription identifying the tomb of Caecilia Metella, daughter of Quintus Caecilius Metellus Creticus and the wife of Marcus Licinius Crassus; it reads Caeciliae, Q. Cretici. f., Metellae, Crassi, "Caecilia, daughter of Quintus Creticus, of the Metellus family and of the Crassus family"

Naming conventions for women in ancient Rome differed from nomenclature for men, and practice changed dramatically from the Early Republic to the High Empire and then into Late Antiquity. Females were identified officially by the feminine of the family name (nomen gentile, that is, the gens name), which might be further differentiated by the genitive form of the father's cognomen, or for a married woman her husband's. Numerical adjectives might distinguish among sisters, such as Tertia, "the Third" (compare Generational titles in English names). By the late Republic, women also often adopted the feminine of their father's cognomen.

A woman kept her own family name after she married, though she might be identified in relation to her husband: the name Clodia Metelli, "Clodia [wife] of Metellus," preserves the birth name Clodia and adds her husband's name to specify which Clodia. Children usually took the father's name. In the Imperial period, however, children might sometimes make their mother's family name part of theirs, or even adopt it instead.

== History ==
=== Early to Middle Republic ===
Women in the early to mid-Republic were usually known by their family name (nomen). A woman from the gens Aemilia would be called Aemilia; from the gens Cornelia, Cornelia; from the gens Sempronia, Sempronia; and so on. If there were many daughters, a cognomen such as Tertia (Third) could indicate birth order, for example, Aemilia Tertia, the wife of Scipio Africanus. (She, however, is better known as Aemilia Paulla.) The comparative adjectives Maior and Minor, meaning "the Elder" and "the Younger" when attached to a name, might distinguish between two sisters; for example, the daughters of Gaius Laelius Sapiens are known as Laelia Maior and Laelia Minor.

Birth order is not the best or only predictor of a woman's perceived importance or prominence; Cornelia Africana most commonly refers to Cornelia Africana Minor, the younger daughter of Scipio Africanus, and not to her elder sister.

Sons, by comparison, were distinguished by a praenomen, the first or personal name of a Roman male's typical three names (tria nomina). The eldest son was most often given the same praenomen as his father, with others given the name of a grandfather or uncle. This tradition casts doubt on the usage of numerical names: the masculine praenomina Quintus ("the Fifth"), Sextus ("the Sixth"), and Decimus ("the Tenth") were widely used without reference to birth order, because they were passed on. Thus the semi-legendary Claudia Quinta should have been the fifth daughter of her patrician father from the gens Claudia, but it is doubtful that four older sisters existed: Quinta is probably an archaic feminine praenomen that later Latin authors treated as a cognomen.

=== Late Republic ===
By the Late Republic, a cognomen, the third of the tria nomina, becomes more important in distinguishing family branches of the main gens. The importance of the cognomen is reflected also in naming practice as it pertains to women, for example Cornelia Sulla, Pompeia Magna, Cornelia Metella. Licinia Crassa Maior and Licinia Crassa Minor were daughters of Lucius Licinius Crassus.

Girls might also be given their mother's name if they were born outside of marriage.

=== High Empire ===
In the era of Augustus and thereafter, Roman women used more varied first names and sometimes even two first names. Naming practice became less rigid, as is evidenced among women of the Julio-Claudian dynasty. While Augustus's wives were known by the name of their paternal gens (Claudia, Scribonia, and Livia) and Tiberius's wives were known by their fathers' less-known gentilical names (Vipsania Agrippina and Julia the Elder), by the third generation of the Imperial family, naming conventions had changed. Julia's daughters by her second husband Marcus Vipsanius Agrippa were Julia the Younger and Agrippina the Elder, not Vipsania Quinta and Vipsania Sexta. Likewise, Agrippina the Elder's daughters were Agrippina the Younger, Drusilla, and Livilla, and not named for their father's adoptive family, the Julia gens. Likewise, in the family of Octavia the Younger and Mark Antony, the naming conventions for their daughters (Antonia Major and Antonia Minor) and Octavia's by her first husband (Claudia Marcella Major and Claudia Marcella Minor) are conventional, but that for their granddaughter Livilla, daughter of Nero Claudius Drusus, is not.

In later generations, females were given two names. This meant that Claudius's daughters were not Claudia Major and Claudia Minor, but Claudia Antonia by his marriage to Aelia Paetina and Claudia Octavia by his marriage to Messalina. Among the elite, names such as Pomponia Graecina became common. In still later generations, women's names bore little or no resemblance to their father's familial names. For example, in the Flavian dynasty, Titus's daughter was not Flavia. In the Severan dynasty, most women bore the first name of Julia, even if it was not the family's gentilical name, but the second name was different and hence distinguished them. In the Theodosian dynasty, the daughter of Theodosius I was not Theodosia but Galla Placidia, and named partly for her mother.

- A woman could be named for a grandparent. For example, Livilla, sister of Germanicus and Claudius, was named for her paternal grandmother Livia.
- A woman could be named by a combination of her familial name and the name of a mother or grandmother. Claudius' first wife, Plautia Urgulanilla, was named for her father's family, the Plautii, and her paternal grandmother, Urgulania, a close friend of Claudius's own paternal grandmother Livia.
- A woman could also be named for her father's family and a place of origin, somewhat like men, but without a unique praenomen.
- A woman could be named in honor of other relatives. This naming convention applied to Caligula's three sisters. The middle of the three sisters, Julia Drusilla, was named for her paternal grandfather Nero Claudius Drusus, itself a cognomen. The youngest of the three sisters, Julia Livilla, was named for her paternal aunt, Livilla. The eldest of the three sisters, Agrippina the Younger, was named after her mother. Likewise, Julia the Younger, Agrippina's maternal aunt, was also named in honor of her mother.

Some empresses were given the praenomen Julia even if they were unrelated to the gens of Julia. Some, like Livia and Agrippina the Younger, were awarded the agnomen of Augusta ("Majestic"), a parallel of their husbands' (Augustus). Some empresses also added the nomen of their husband to their own, such as Annia Aurelia Galeria Lucilla, wife of Marcus Aurelius, or Annia Aurelia Faustina, wife of Elagabalus. Later examples include Galeria Valeria, wife of Galerius, and Flavia Maximiana Theodora, wife of Constantius I.

=== Late antiquity ===
In Late antiquity, women were frequently named for their mothers or other female relatives, who in turn were often named for female (or sometimes male) Christian saints. Thus the Empress Galla Placidia's name shows only her mother's name, not her father's. Other examples: Arria was a daughter of Thrasea Paetus and his wife Arria; and possibly Considia, daughter of Servilius Nonianus.

Empresses bearing pagan names—e.g. Aelia Eudocia, formerly Athenaïs—were renamed to have more Christian names, sometimes for an earlier empress. A few empresses such as Theodora, wife of Justinian, were also allegedly renamed. Late Byzantine empresses bore Greek names since the principal language of the Byzantine Empire was not Latin but Greek:

- Anna (meaning "grace/charm" or "mercy")
- Agnes ("chaste" or "sacred"), a name of one of the earliest Christian saints, Agnes of Rome
- Irene ("peace"),
- Eudoxia ("good fame")
- Euphrosyne ("joy")
- Theodora ("god's gift")
- Zoe ("life")

== Suffixes ==
Many times women needed unofficial names to differentiate them between their relatives, this was often done with the help of suffixes, for example the diminutive suffix illa/ila (alternatively ulla/ula or olla/ola) meaning "small" or "little" was used often, for example: Julilla for a young Julia, Drusilla for a young Drusa. The suffix derived from the word ulla which was the word for a little pit and could be used to denote that the woman in question was a younger relative of someone with the same name, that she was still a little girl, or simply implying affection, for example Cicero's daughter Tullia was called by him "Tulliola" even as an adult despite not having any older sisters or other notable female relatives. Another suffix used was ina/inna which would imply relative of, for example "Agrippina was the daughter of Agrippa" or "Messalina was the daughter of Messala". The ina suffix was often used for cognomina which ended in "a", meaning that there was no generic way to feminize them.

A third rarer form was iana which could be added to the name of a woman whose father was adopted into another family or to indicate the family of her mother such as Ulpia Marciana who was the daughter of Marcia and Marcus Ulpius Traianus.

There were also rare cases of combining two suffixes, such as "Agripp-in(a)-illa" (Note: Agrippinilla was also used by Robert Graves in his books (I, Claudius and Claudius the God) as the name of Agrippina the Younger.) the wife of Marcus Gavius Squilla Gallicanus, the consul of 127. The suffixes were not always added to the end of the nomen or cognomen, but sometimes also to a woman's numeral, for example, Brutus' sister Junia Tertia was nicknamed Tertulla. The most common forms for all the female numerals were Primula, Secundina, Tertiola/Tertulla, Quartilla and Quintilla/Quintina.

== See also ==
- Women in ancient Rome
- Roman naming conventions
