= Vipsania (wife of Varus) =

1st-century BC Roman noblewoman and daughter of Marcus Vipsanius Agrippa

- Spouse: Publius Quinctilius Varus
- Children: Sextus Nonius Quinctilianus
- Parents: Marcus Vipsanius Agrippa (father); Claudia Marcella Major (mother)
- Relatives: gens Vipsania
- Family: Julio-Claudian dynasty

Vipsania (likely born between 28 and 22 BC and sometimes called Vipsania Marcella to differentiate her from her sisters) was an ancient Roman noblewoman of the first century BC. She was married to the politician Publius Quinctilius Varus and was a daughter of Roman general Marcus Vipsanius Agrippa and his second wife Claudia Marcella Major (the niece of emperor Caesar Augustus).

== History ==
=== Early life ===
Vipsania was likely born between 28 BC and 22 BC to Marcus Vipsanius Agrippa and his second wife Claudia Marcella Major, the eldest daughter of emperor Augustus sister Octavia Minor. This hypothesis is rebutted by Meyer Reinhold who considered that she was the daughter by Agrippa's first wife Pomponia Caecilia Attica.

She is thought to have had a younger full sister and two older half sisters (one who married Quintus Haterius and another named Vipsania Agrippina who married the future emperor Tiberius) as well as five younger half-siblings named Gaius Caesar, Lucius Caesar, Agrippina the Elder, Vipsania Julia and Agrippa Postumus from her father's third and last marriage to Julia the Elder. From her mother she also likely had several younger half siblings, among them Lucius Antonius and Iulla Antonia.

=== Marriage ===
She likely married Varus around 14 BC. She was his second wife. Their marriage was considered the reason why Varus was selected to be consul in 13 BC with Tiberius. She might have been the mother of Sextus Nonius Quinctilianus if he was indeed Varus' son or another son who served with his father in 4 AD. Their marriage did not last much longer than a decade from his consulship, since by then Varus was married to another woman.

== Research ==
Her existence was first discovered to modern historians upon the rediscovery of a papyrus recounting Augustus' funeral oration for Agrippa which states that Varus and Tiberius were both sons-in-law to Agrippa.

== See also ==
- List of Roman women
- Women in ancient Rome
