= Lucius Antonius (grandson of Mark Antony) =

Grandson of Mark Antony and Fulvia (20 BC – AD 25)

- Born: 20 BC
- Died: 25 AD
- Children: Marcus Antonius Primus (possibly) (Note: Renaissance historians sometimes believed based on a misreading of Tacitus that Lucius had a son (or nephew) named Sextus Antonius Africanus.)
- Parents: Iullus Antonius (father); Claudia Marcella Major (mother)
- Relatives: Octavia Minor, maternal grandmother
- Family: Julio-Claudian dynasty

Lucius Antonius (20 BC – AD 25) was the son of Iullus Antonius (son of Mark Antony) and Claudia Marcella Major (niece of emperor Augustus).

== Biography ==
=== Early life ===
From his mother's earlier marriage to Marcus Vipsanius Agrippa he had two older attested siblings, two half-sisters named Vipsania Marcella and Vipsania Marcellina. Some epigraphic evidence suggests he had a sister named Iulla Antonia (Note: There has been some speculation that Iulla was actually Lucius daughter, but this seems unlikely as he left Rome while young and it is improbable that he had fathered a child already. It is possible that his sister was allowed to stay in the city because she had already married an important man by the time of their fathers downfall, (as noble Roman women married before their male counterparts), or it is possible that the writing was created before Iullus was disgraced and if so then the epigraph could not be referring to a daughter of Lucius.) and a brother named Iullus. Around 1 BC he had probably already been betrothed to a girl of high birth.

In 2 BC his father was charged with adultery with Julia (daughter of Augustus) and was forced to commit suicide. Lucius was sent to Marseille as a result of his father's indiscretion. Lucius was described as a adulescentulus at the time, meaning that he was quite young. He was sent there under the pretence of "studying", and it was not an official exile but was in practise the same as one. Once there he studied law.

=== Later life ===
G. V. Sumner proposed that Lucius may have been a progenitor of a Junius Blaesus who was descended from Marcus Antonius.

Tacitus records his death in AD 25 at Ann. 4.44.4-5. Despite his father's actions the senate decreed that he should be honoured with a burial at the Tomb of the Octavii, which was the tomb of his maternal grandmother Octavia Minor. This was likely done at the request of a relative (or relatives) in the imperial family, possibly his mother Marcella if she was still alive at the time.

== Cultural depictions ==
A boy on the Ara Pacis has been identified by some to possibly be Lucius.

== Sources ==
- Tacitus - The Annals of Imperial Rome
- Suetonius - The Twelve Caesars
