= Vipsania (wife of Lepidus) =

1st century BC Roman noblewoman and daughter of Marcus Vipsanius Agrippa

- Spouse: Marcus Aemilius Lepidus
- Children: Aemilia Lepida
- Parents: Marcus Vipsanius Agrippa (father); Claudia Marcella Major (mother)
- Relatives: gens Vipsania

Vipsania (likely born between 27-21 BC and sometimes called Vipsania Marcella Minor or Vipsania Marcellina to differentiate her from her sisters) was an ancient Roman noblewoman of the first century BC. She was married to the politician Marcus Aemilius Lepidus and was likely the daughter of Roman general Marcus Vipsanius Agrippa and his second wife Claudia Marcella Major (the niece of emperor Caesar Augustus).

== History ==
=== Early life ===
Vipsania was likely born between 27 BC and 21 BC to Marcus Vipsanius Agrippa and his second wife Claudia Marcella Major, the eldest daughter of emperor Augustus sister Octavia Minor. From her father she likely had an older (assumed due to the age difference between their husbands) full sister and two older half sisters (one who married Quintus Haterius and another named Vipsania Agrippina who married the future emperor Tiberius) as well as five younger half-siblings named Gaius Caesar, Lucius Caesar, Agrippina the Elder, Vipsania Julia and Agrippa Postumus from her father's third and last marriage to Julia the Elder. From her mother she also likely had several younger half siblings, among them Lucius Antonius and Iulla Antonia.

=== Marriage ===
Vipsania likely married Marcus Aemilius Lepidus the consul of 6 AD as his first wife, when they were both relatively young. She was the niece of his father's recently wed second wife, Claudia Marcella Minor, so the marriage was likely made to improve their political standing. The two likely had children, an inscription to an assumed son survives on the Basilica Aemilia. Ronald Syme has speculated that this man may have been the husband of an Appuleia recorded in an anecdote by Pliny to have been married to a Marcus Lepidus. The anecdote describes Appuleia to have divorced her husband because of his alcoholism, which caused him to drink himself to death. (Note: Generally this Appuleia is assumed to have been the mother of Lepidus the triumvir or sometimes Appuleia Varilla.) A woman named Aemilia Lepida is known to be the consuls' daughter, but it is unknown if she was a daughter by Vipsania. If she is not the mother of Lepida then that would imply that she died relatively young.

== See also ==
- List of Roman women
- Women in ancient Rome
