= Marcus Aemilius Lepidus (consul 6 AD) =

Roman senator, politician and general (c. 30 BC-33 AD)

- Died: 33 AD
- Spouses: Vipsania Marcellina; unknown second wife
- Children: Aemilia Lepida; Marcus Aemilius Lepidus (possibly)
- Parents: Paullus Aemilius Lepidus (father); Cornelia (mother)

Marcus Aemilius Lepidus (c. 30 BC – 33 AD) was a patrician Roman senator, politician and general, praised by the historian Tacitus.

== Origin and early career ==
Lepidus was the son of Cornelia and Paullus Aemilius Lepidus (who served as a censor) and brother-in-law to Augustus' granddaughter Julia the Younger, who was married to his brother Lucius Aemilius Paullus, consul in 1 AD. Thus, he was a member of one of the oldest patrician families, the Aemilii.

He became consul in 6 AD. He then distinguished himself as legate in charge of an army during the Illyrian War (6 – 9 AD) under the command of Tiberius, the later emperor. After the end of the war he served as governor either of Dalmatia (modern day Croatia and Bosnia) or Pannonia (modern day Hungary).

At the time of Augustus' death, in 14 AD, he was governor of Northern Spain in charge of an army of three legions. While there were serious riots in the armies in Germany and Pannonia after Augustus' death, Lepidus' army gave no trouble.

== Activities during the reign of Tiberius ==
Lepidus defended Gnaeus Calpurnius Piso (a friend of Tiberius, but also a relative of Lepidus) at his trial for the alleged poisoning of Germanicus.

In 21 AD, Tiberius offered him the governorship of Africa Province. He rejected the offer, claiming ill-health and the demands of his children, but more likely he recognised the wisdom of leaving the position to Quintus Junius Blaesus, uncle of Lucius Aelius Sejanus, the powerful praetorian prefect. Although this may make Lepidus seem unduly subservient towards the emperor Tiberius and his powerful allies, Lepidus' activities in the senate show an independent mind. In 21 AD he made a strong speech against the death penalty for an irreverent poet. Nevertheless, the poet was executed by order of the Senate. This allowed Tiberius to praise Lepidus' moderation (as well as the Senate's zeal in persecuting any offence against the Emperor).

Modern scholars have suggested that Lepidus also restored the Basilica Aemilia in the Roman Forum in 22 AD and served as governor of Asia in 26 AD. Apparently, Lepidus was one of the few aristocrats obtaining high positions (including command of large armies) in this troubled time without ever being accused of plotting against the Emperor. Although in 32 AD an important senator, Cotta Messalinus, openly attacked him because of his excessive influence in the Senate, this accusation had no consequences. Lepidus died in 33 AD. Tacitus described him as "wise and noble" for his actions as a senator. According to Tacitus his actions could be taken as an example of independent aristocrats living under tyranny.

== Descendants ==
It is possible Lepidus married Vipsania Marcellina, daughter of Marcus Vipsanius Agrippa and his second wife Claudia Marcella Major (niece of the Emperor Augustus). If so, then a son of hers is identified from a dedication inscription in the basilica Aemilia. After Vipsania he married a second time to an unknown woman; it is unsure if she or Vipsania was the mother of his other children. His daughter Aemilia Lepida married Drusus Caesar, a son of Germanicus and Agrippina the Elder. Although it is uncertain, some historians believe that he was also father to the Marcus Aemilius Lepidus who became Caligula's lover and brother-in-law, as husband to Julia Drusilla.

== Notes ==
Political offices
Preceded by Gaius Vibius Postumus, and Gaius Ateius Capito as Suffect consuls	Consul of the Roman Empire; AD 6 with Lucius Arruntius, followed by Lucius Nonius Asprenas	Succeeded by Quintus Caecilius Metellus Creticus Silanus, and Aulus Licinius Nerva Silianus as Ordinary consuls
