= Julia the Younger =

Granddaughter of emperor Augustus (19 BC – c. 29 AD)

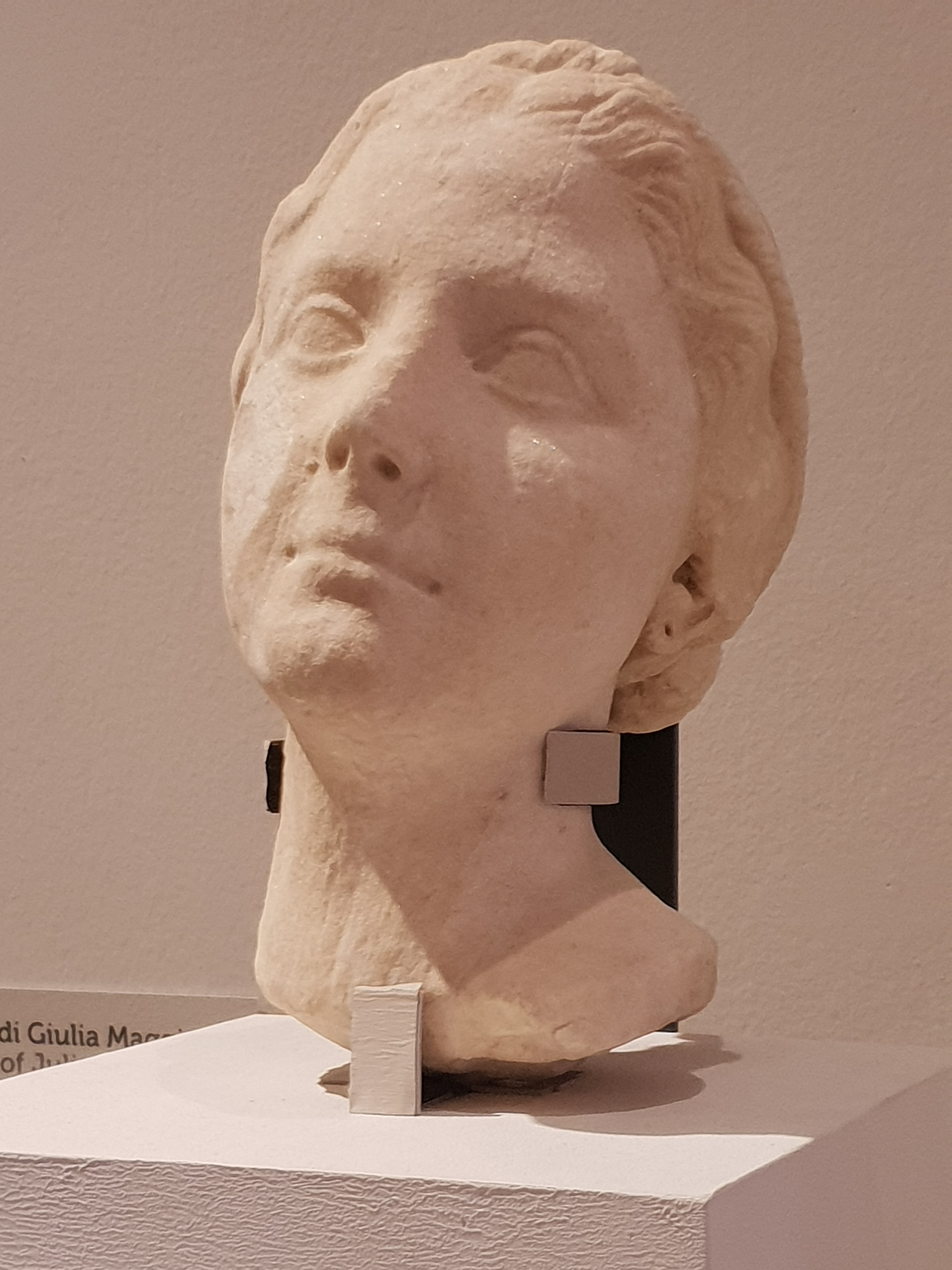
- Bust presumed to depict Julia
- Born: 19 BC
- Died: 28 AD (aged 47); Tremirus
- Spouse: Lucius Aemilius Paullus
- Issue: Aemilia Lepida; Marcus Aemilius Lepidus (possibly)
- Dynasty: Julio-Claudian dynasty
- Father: Marcus Vipsanius Agrippa
- Mother: Julia the Elder

Vipsania Julia Agrippina (19 BC – c. 28 AD), nicknamed Julia Minor (Classical Latin: IVLIA•MINOR) and called Julia the Younger by modern historians, was a Roman noblewoman of the Julio-Claudian dynasty. She was emperor Augustus' first granddaughter, being the first daughter and second child of Julia the Elder and her husband Marcus Vipsanius Agrippa. Along with her siblings, Julia was raised and educated by her maternal grandfather Augustus and her maternal step-grandmother Livia Drusilla. Like her siblings, she played an important role in the dynastic plans of Augustus, but much like her mother, she was disgraced due to infidelity later on in her life.

== Life ==
Around 5 or 6 BC, Augustus arranged for Julia to marry Lucius Aemilius Paullus. Paullus had a family relation to her as her half first-cousin, as both had Scribonia as grandmother: Julia's mother was a daughter of Scribonia by Augustus, while Paullus' mother, Cornelia, was a daughter of Scribonia resulting from her earlier marriage to Gnaeus Cornelius Lentulus Marcellinus.

Paullus and Julia had a daughter, Aemilia Lepida, and possibly a son, Marcus Aemilius Lepidus (although he may instead have been the son of Marcus Aemilius Lepidus). Julia may have had the rights of Jus trium liberorum, the rights held by Roman women who had three children who survived birth, but some women of the imperial family were sometimes granted these rights without having given birth to three children.

According to Suetonius, Julia built a large, pretentious country house. Augustus disliked large, overdone houses and had it demolished.

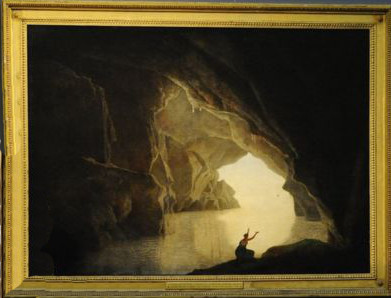
Julia was imagined in Grotto in the Gulf of Salerno by Joseph Wright of Derby in 1774.

In 8 AD, according to ancient historians, Julia was exiled for having an affair with Decimus Junius Silanus, a Roman Senator. She was sent to Tremirus, a small Italian island, where she gave birth to a child. Augustus rejected the infant and ordered it to be exposed, or left on a mountainside to die. Silanus went into voluntary exile, but returned under Tiberius' reign. Sometime between 1 AD and 14 AD, her husband Paullus was executed as a conspirator in a revolt. Modern historians theorize that Julia's exile was not actually for adultery but for involvement in Paullus' revolt. Livia plotted against her stepdaughter's family and ruined them, according to some. This led to open compassion for the fallen family. In 28 AD, Julia died on the same island where she had been sent in exile twenty years earlier. Due to the adultery that Julia allegedly committed, Augustus stated in his will that she would never be buried in Rome.

== Unusual naming ==
Julia the Younger was not a member of the Julian gens by birth: being the daughter of Marcus Vipsanius Agrippa made her a Vipsania Agrippina by birth, although there are no contemporary sources that show that that name was ever used for her. She came to belong to the household of the Julio-Claudian dynasty as she was raised and instructed by her maternal grandfather Augustus. Further, Augustus adopted Tiberius as his son (and heir), while Tiberius was remarried to Julia the Elder. Augustus became something of a paternal grandfather to Julia the Elder's children, too, including Julia the Younger. A formal adoption "in the family of the Caesars" among the offspring of Agrippa and Julia the Elder is however only recorded regarding Vipsania Julia's brothers Gaius Vipsanius Agrippa—hence Gaius Julius Caesar—and Lucius Vipsanius Agrippa—hence Lucius Julius Caesar. Her younger sister Agrippina the Elder and youngest full brother, Marcus Vipsanius Agrippa Postumus, were named after their natural father only until Agrippa Postumus was adopted by Augustus as Agrippa Julius Caesar. Likewise, her eldest half-sisters, Vipsania Agrippina, Vipsania Attica, Vipsania Marcella and Vipsania Marcellina, were named after their father. Her younger half-brother, the son of Tiberius, had died young.

== See also ==
- Julio-Claudian family tree

== Bibliography ==
- Meise, Eckhard (1969). Untersuchungen zur Geschichte der Julisch-Claudischen Dynastie [Studies on the history of the Julio-Claudian dynasty]. Vestigia, vol. 10. Munich: Beck, pp. 35-48.
