= Agrippa (praenomen) =

Latin name

Agrippa is a Latin praenomen, or personal name, which was most common during the early centuries of the Roman Republic. It was sometimes abbreviated Agr., or occasionally Agripp.; both forms are found in the Fasti Capitolini. Despite ending in -a, it is a masculine name. The feminine form was probably Agrippina, which is also found as a cognomen, or surname, but no examples of its use as a praenomen have survived.

The praenomen Agrippa was regularly used by two patrician gentes, gens Furia and gens Menenia, who held several consulships during the early Republic. It was also the name of one of the legendary kings of Alba Longa, Agrippa Silvius, whose descendants came to Rome following the destruction of that city during the reign of Tullus Hostilius. Although the name is not known to have been used as a praenomen in the later Republic and Empire, it appeared as a cognomen in several families.

== Etymology ==
Roman scholar Marcus Terentius Varro listed Agrippa as one of several archaic praenomina that had passed out of use by the 1st century BC. At least according to legend, it was used in pre-Roman times, and it appears as a praenomen in the earliest years of the Republic. The meaning of the name is unknown. Gaius Plinius Secundus speculated that it was originally used for a child who was born feet-first (a breech birth). However, this is probably a false etymology.

In The Origin of Roman Praenomina, George Davis Chase, following August Fick's work on Greek personal names, speculated that the name was derived from Greek, and that it entered Latin via contact with Magna Graecia. However, Chase notes that the name does not appear in Greek sources, and concludes that the Italians must have changed the stem to conform to the pattern of Italic names.

== Later use as cognomen ==
As a cognomen it was used by several gentes including the Asinii, Fonteii, Haterii, Julii, and Vipsanii. Each of these families may once have used Agrippa as a praenomen. As a cognomen, the name survived into Imperial times. With the gradual abandonment of the Roman nomenclature system, Agrippa once again became a personal name, surviving into modern times.

== See also ==
- List of Roman nomina
- List of Roman gentes
