= Marcus Vipsanius Agrippa =

Roman general and statesman (c. 63–12 BC)

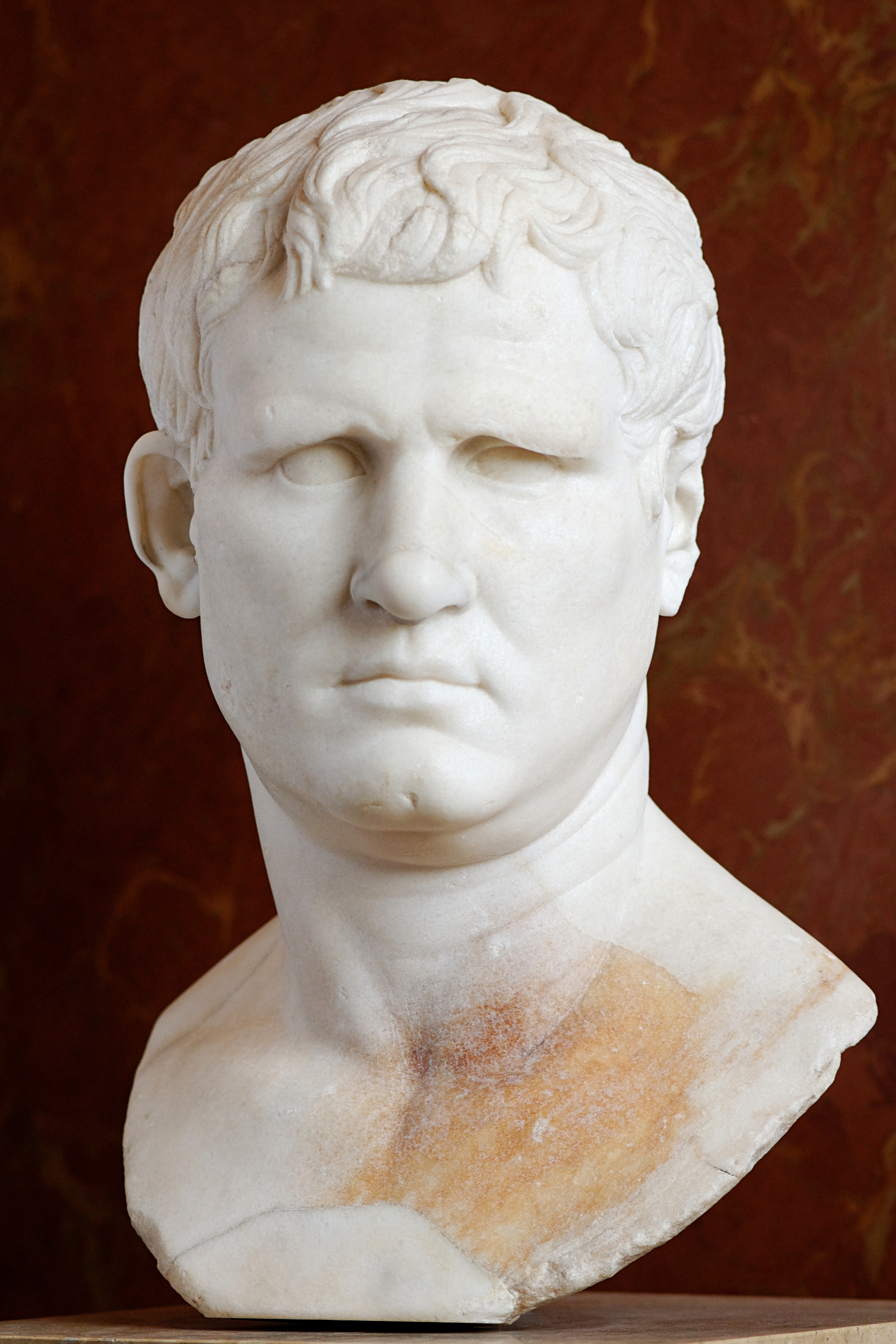
- Bust of Agrippa in the Louvre Museum, Paris, c. 25–24 BC
- Born: c. 63 BC; Uncertain location, possibly Arpinum, Istria or Asisium
- Died: 12 BC (aged 50–51); Campania, Italy
- Resting place: Mausoleum of Augustus
- Occupations: Soldier; politician
- Notable work: Pantheon (original)
- Office: Urban Praetor (40 BC); Consul (37, 28–27 BC); Tribunicia Potestas (from 18 BC)
- Spouses: Caecilia Attica, Claudia Marcella Maior, Julia the Elder
- Children: List: Vipsania Agrippina Vipsania Attica Vipsania Marcella Vipsania Marcellina Gaius Caesar Julia the Younger Lucius Caesar Agrippina the Elder Agrippa Postumus
- Father: Lucius Vipsanius (father of Agrippa)
- Family: gens Vipsania

Military service
- Allegiance: Roman Republic, Roman Empire
- Years of service: 45–12 BC
- Battles/wars: Caesar's civil war; Battle of Munda; War of Mutina; Battle of Mutina; Liberators' civil war; Battle of Philippi; Perusine War; Bellum Siculum; Battle of Mylae; Battle of Naulochus; Illyricum campaigns; War of Actium; Battle of Actium; Battle of Alexandria; Cantabrian Wars

Marcus Vipsanius Agrippa (Note: He discarded his nomen Vipsanius and was called simply Marcus Agrippa for most of his public career and in official inscriptions, possibly to mask his lowborn origin. Reinhold Marcus Agrippa pp. 6–8) (/əˈɡrɪpə/; c. 63 BC – 12 BC) was a Roman general and statesman who was a close friend, son-in-law and lieutenant to the Roman emperor Augustus. Agrippa is well known for his important military victories, notably the Battle of Actium in 31 BC against the forces of Marcus Antonius and Cleopatra. He was also responsible for the construction of some of the most notable buildings of his era, including the original Pantheon.

Born to a plebeian family c. 63 BC, in an uncertain location in Roman Italy, he met the future emperor Augustus, then known as Octavian, at Apollonia, in Illyria. Following the assassination of Octavian's great-uncle Julius Caesar in 44 BC, Octavian returned to Italy. Around this time, Agrippa was elected tribune of the plebs. He served as a military commander, fighting alongside Octavian and Caesar's former general and right-hand man Marcus Antonius in the Battle of Philippi. In 40 BC, he was praetor urbanus and played a major role in the Perusine war against Lucius Antonius and Fulvia, respectively the brother and wife of Marcus Antonius. In 39 or 38 BC, Agrippa was appointed governor of Transalpine Gaul. In 38 BC, he put down a rising of the Aquitanians and fought the Germanic tribes. He was made consul for 37 BC, despite being well below the usual minimum age of 43, in order to oversee the preparations for war against Sextus Pompeius (Pompey), who had cut off grain shipments to Rome.

Agrippa defeated Pompey in the battles of Mylae and Naulochus in 36 BC. In 33 BC, he served as curule aedile. Agrippa commanded the victorious Octavian's fleet at the Battle of Actium in 31 BC. A few years after the victory at Actium, Octavian became emperor and took the title of Princeps, while Agrippa remained as his close friend and lieutenant. Agrippa assisted Augustus in making Rome "a city of marble". Agrippa renovated aqueducts to provide Roman citizens from every social class access to the highest quality public services, and was responsible for the creation of many baths, porticoes, and gardens. He was also awarded powers almost as great as those of Augustus. He had veto power over the acts of the Senate and the power to present laws for approval by the People. He died in 12 BC at the age of 50–51. Augustus honoured his memory with a magnificent funeral and spent over a month in mourning. His remains were placed in Augustus' own mausoleum.

Agrippa was also known as a writer, especially on geography. Under his supervision, Julius Caesar's design of having a complete survey of the empire made was accomplished. From the materials at hand he constructed a circular chart, which was engraved on marble by Augustus and afterwards placed in the colonnade built by his sister Vipsania Polla. Agrippa was also husband to Julia the Elder (who had later married the second emperor Tiberius), and was the maternal grandfather of Caligula and the maternal great-grandfather of the Emperor Nero.

== Early life, family, and early career ==
=== Early life and family ===
Agrippa was born c. 63 BC, in an uncertain location. His father was called Lucius Vipsanius. His mother's name is not known and Pliny the Elder said his cognomen "Agrippa" derived from his having been born breech so it is possible that she died in childbirth. Pliny also stated that he suffered from lameness as a child. He had an elder brother whose name was also Lucius Vipsanius, and a sister named Vipsania Polla. His family originated in the Italian countryside, and was of humbler and plebeian origins when compared to the highest families of the Roman aristocracy. They had not been prominent in Roman public life (but were nevertheless massively wealthy if compared to the average Roman family). According to some scholars, including Victor Gardthausen, R. E. A. Palmer, and David Ridgway, Agrippa's family was originally from Pisa in Etruria.

Agrippa's family most likely gained Roman citizenship after the Social War in 87 BC and, like many other Italians, immigrated to Rome to take advantage of the social mobility opportunities that arose at the war's end.

=== Early career ===
Agrippa was the same age as Octavian (later Augustus), and the two were educated together and became close friends. Despite Agrippa's association with the family of Julius Caesar, his elder brother chose the opposing side in the civil wars of the 40s BC, fighting under Cato against Caesar in Africa. When Cato's forces were defeated, Agrippa's brother was taken prisoner but freed after Octavian interceded on his behalf.

It is not known whether Agrippa fought against his brother in Africa, but he probably served in Caesar's campaign of 46 to 45 BC against Gnaeus Pompeius, which culminated in the Battle of Munda. Caesar regarded him highly enough to send him with Octavian in 45 BC to study in Apollonia (on the Illyrian coast) with the Macedonian legions, while Caesar consolidated his power in Rome. In the fourth month of their stay in Apollonia the news of Julius Caesar's assassination in March 44 BC reached them. Agrippa and another friend, Quintus Salvidienus Rufus, advised Octavian to march on Rome with the troops from Macedonia, but Octavian decided to sail to Italy with a small retinue. After his arrival, he learned that Caesar had adopted him as his legal heir.

== Rise to power ==
=== Friend to Octavian ===
After Octavian's return to Rome, he and his supporters realised they needed the support of legions. Agrippa helped Octavian to levy troops in Campania. Once Octavian had his legions, he made a pact with Mark Antony and Lepidus, legally established in 43 BC as the Second Triumvirate. Octavian and his consular colleague Quintus Pedius arranged for Caesar's assassins to be prosecuted in their absence, and Agrippa was entrusted with the case against Gaius Cassius Longinus. It may have been in the same year that Agrippa began his political career, holding the position of tribune of the plebs, which granted him entry to the Senate.

In 42 BC, Agrippa probably fought alongside Octavian and Antony in the Battle of Philippi. After their return to Rome, he played a major role in Octavian's war against Lucius Antonius and Fulvia, respectively the brother and wife of Mark Antony, which began in 41 BC and ended in the capture of Perusia in 40 BC. However, Salvidienus remained Octavian's main general at this time. After the Perusine war, Octavian departed for Gaul, leaving Agrippa as urban praetor in Rome with instructions to defend Italy against Sextus Pompeius, an opponent of the Triumvirate who was now occupying Sicily. In July 40 BC, while Agrippa was occupied with the Ludi Apollinares that were the praetor's responsibility, Sextus began a raid in southern Italy. Agrippa advanced on him, forcing him to withdraw. However, the Triumvirate proved unstable, and in August 40 BC both Sextus and Antony invaded Italy (but not in an organized alliance). Agrippa's success in retaking Sipontum from Antony helped bring an end to the conflict. Agrippa was among the intermediaries through whom Antony and Octavian agreed once more upon peace. During the discussions Octavian learned that Salvidienus had offered to betray him to Antony, with the result that Salvidienus was prosecuted and either executed or committed suicide. Agrippa was now Octavian's leading general.

=== Governor of Transalpine Gaul ===
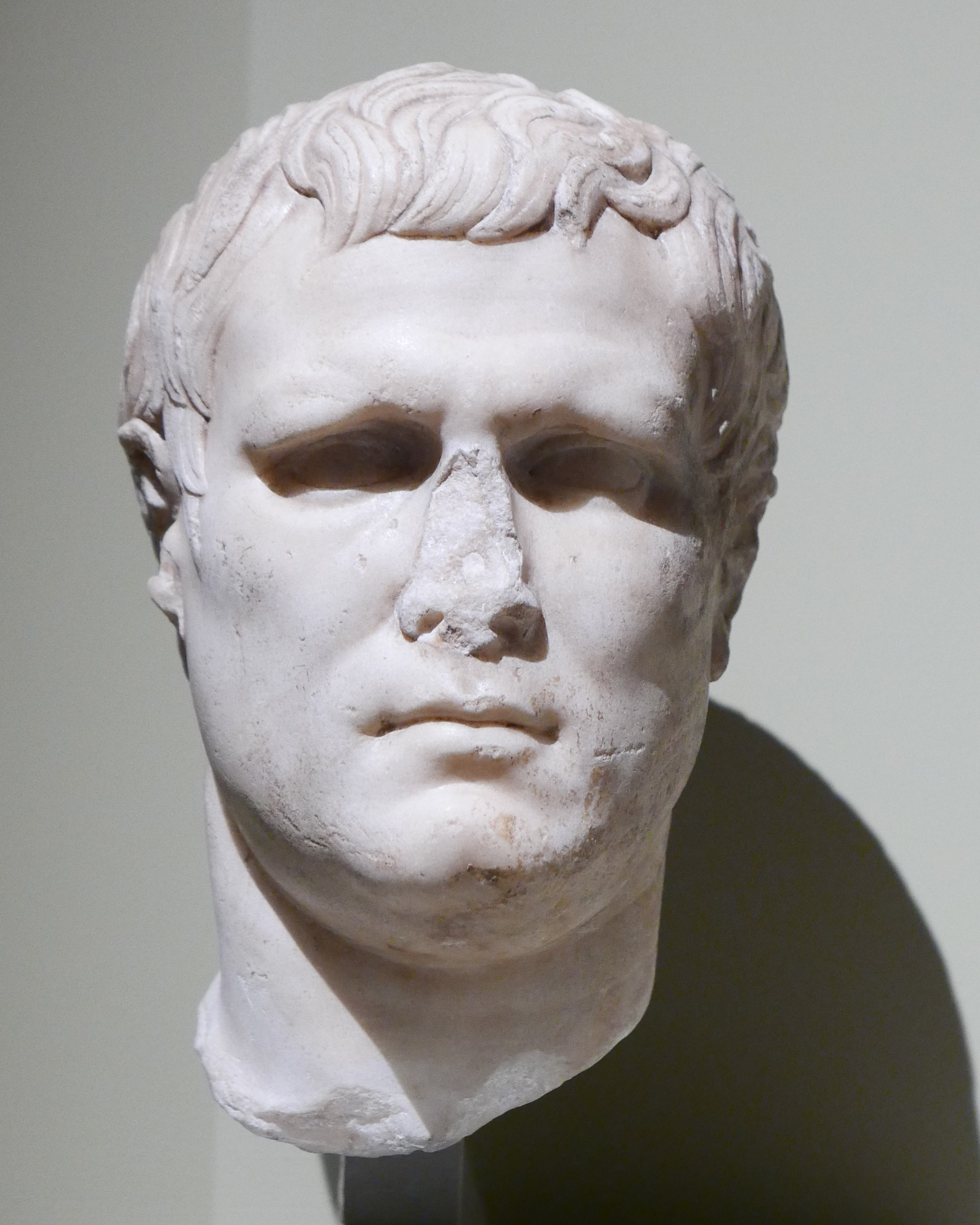
Bust of Agrippa, Musée Saint-Raymond

In 39 or 38 BC, Octavian appointed Agrippa governor of Transalpine Gaul, where in 38 BC he put down a rising of the Aquitanians. He also fought the Germanic tribes, becoming the next Roman general to cross the Rhine after Julius Caesar. He was summoned back to Rome by Octavian to assume the consulship for 37 BC. He was well below the usual minimum age of 43, but Octavian had suffered a humiliating naval defeat against Sextus Pompey and needed his friend to oversee the preparations for further warfare. Agrippa refused the offer of a triumph for his exploits in Gaul – on the grounds, says Dio, that he thought it improper to celebrate during a time of trouble for Octavian.

Since Sextus Pompeius had command of the sea on the coasts of Italy, Agrippa's first care was to provide a safe harbour for Octavian's ships. He accomplished this by cutting through the strips of land which separated the Lacus Lucrinus from the sea, thus forming an outer harbour, while joining the lake Avernus to the Lucrinus to serve as an inner harbour. The new harbour complex was named Portus Julius in Octavian's honour. Agrippa was also responsible for technological improvements, including larger ships and an improved form of grappling hook. About this time, he married Caecilia Pomponia Attica, daughter of Cicero's friend Titus Pomponius Atticus.

=== War with Sextus Pompeius ===
In 36 BC, Octavian and Agrippa set sail against Sextus. The fleet was badly damaged by storms and had to withdraw; Agrippa was left in charge of the second attempt. Thanks to superior technology and training, Agrippa and his men won decisive victories at Mylae and Naulochus, destroying all but seventeen of Sextus' ships and compelling most of his forces to surrender. Octavian, with his power increased, forced the triumvir Lepidus into retirement and entered Rome in triumph. Agrippa received the unprecedented honour of a corona navalis decorated with the beaks of ships; as Dio remarks, this was "a decoration given to nobody before or since".

== Public service ==
Agrippa participated in smaller military campaigns in 35 and 34 BC, but by the autumn of 34 BC he had returned to Rome. He rapidly set out on a campaign of public repairs and improvements, including renovation of the aqueduct known as the Aqua Marcia and an extension of its pipes to cover more of the city. He became the first Curator Aquarum of Rome in 33 BC. Through his actions after being elected in 33 BC as one of the aediles (officials responsible for Rome's buildings and festivals), the streets were repaired and the sewers were cleaned out, and lavish public spectacles were held. Agrippa signalled his tenure of office by effecting great improvements in the city of Rome, restoring and building aqueducts, enlarging and cleansing the Cloaca Maxima, constructing baths and porticos, and laying out gardens. He also gave a stimulus to the public exhibition of works of art. It was unusual for an ex-consul to hold the lower-ranking position of aedile, but Agrippa's success bore out that break with tradition. As emperor, Augustus would later boast that "he had found the city of brick but left it of marble" in part because of the great services provided by Agrippa under his reign.

=== Battle of Actium ===
Agrippa was again called away to take command of the fleet when the war with Antony and Cleopatra broke out. He captured the strategically important city of Methone at the southwest of the Peloponnese, then sailed north, raiding the Greek coast and capturing Corcyra (modern Corfu). Octavian then brought his forces to Corcyra, occupying it as a naval base. Antony drew up his ships and troops at Actium, where Octavian moved to meet him. Agrippa meanwhile defeated Antony's supporter Quintus Nasidius in a naval battle at Patrae. Dio relates that as Agrippa moved to join Octavian near Actium, he encountered Gaius Sosius, one of Antony's lieutenants, who was making a surprise attack on the squadron of Lucius Tarius, a supporter of Octavian. Agrippa's unexpected arrival turned the battle around.

As the decisive battle approached, according to Dio, Octavian received intelligence that Antony and Cleopatra planned to break past his naval blockade and escape. At first he wished to allow the flagships past, arguing that he could overtake them with his lighter vessels and that the other opposing ships would surrender when they saw their leaders' cowardice. Agrippa objected, saying that Antony's ships, although larger, could outrun Octavian's if they hoisted sails, and that Octavian ought to fight now because Antony's fleet had just been struck by storms. Octavian followed his friend's advice.

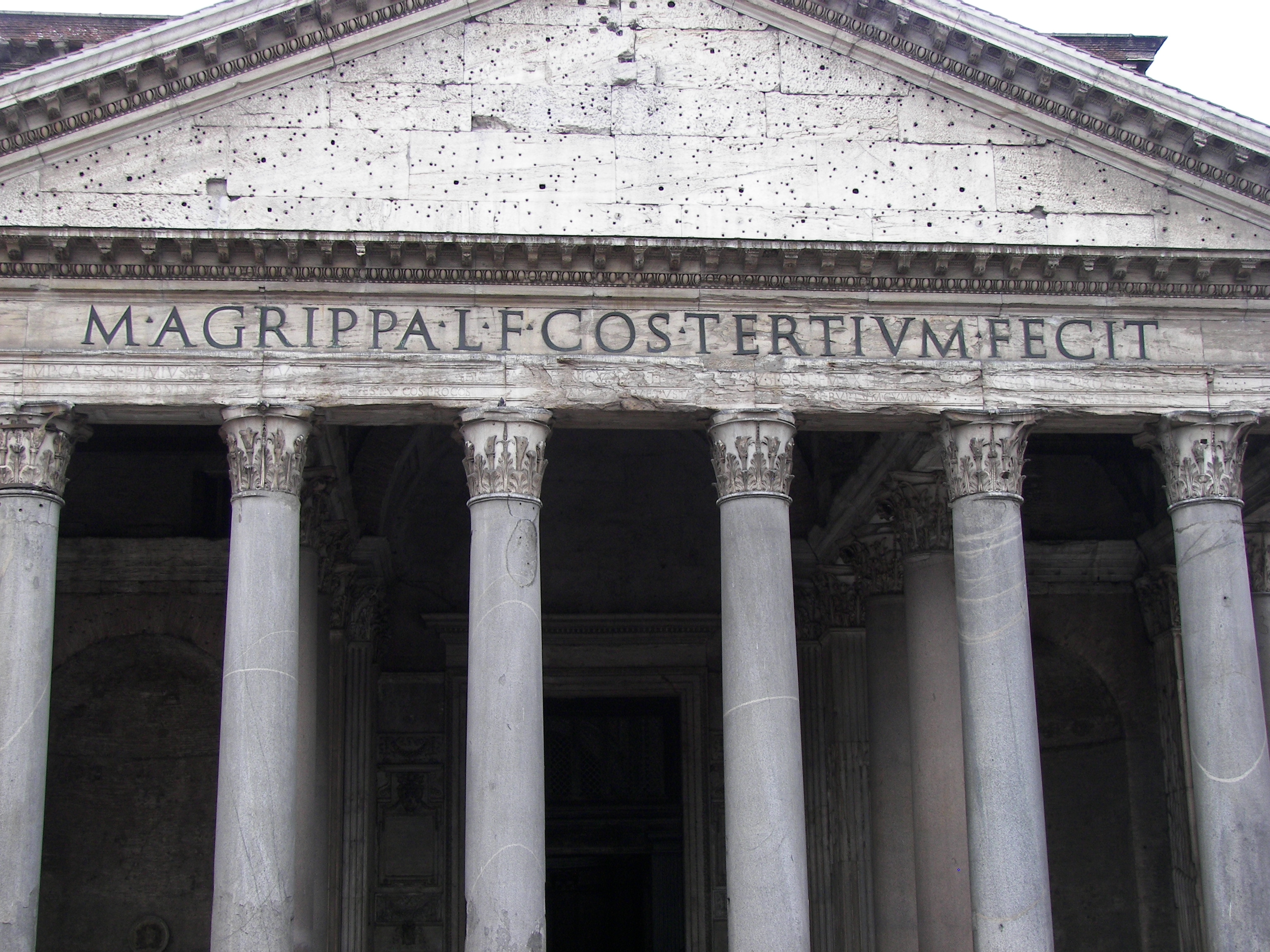
The facade of the Pantheon with the inscription of Agrippa

On 2 September 31 BC, the Battle of Actium was fought. Octavian's victory, which gave him the mastery of Rome and the empire, was mainly due to Agrippa. Octavian then bestowed upon him the hand of his niece Claudia Marcella Major in 28 BC. He also served a second consulship with Octavian the same year. In 27 BC, Agrippa held a third consulship with Octavian, and in that year, the Senate also bestowed upon Octavian the imperial title of Augustus.

In commemoration of the Battle of Actium, Agrippa built and dedicated the building that served as the Roman Pantheon before its destruction in AD 80. Emperor Hadrian used Agrippa's design to build his own Pantheon, which survives in Rome. The inscription of the later building, which was built c. 125, preserves the text of the inscription from Agrippa's building during his third consulship. The years following his third consulship, Agrippa spent in Gaul, reforming the provincial administration and taxation system, along with building an effective road system and aqueducts.

== Later life ==
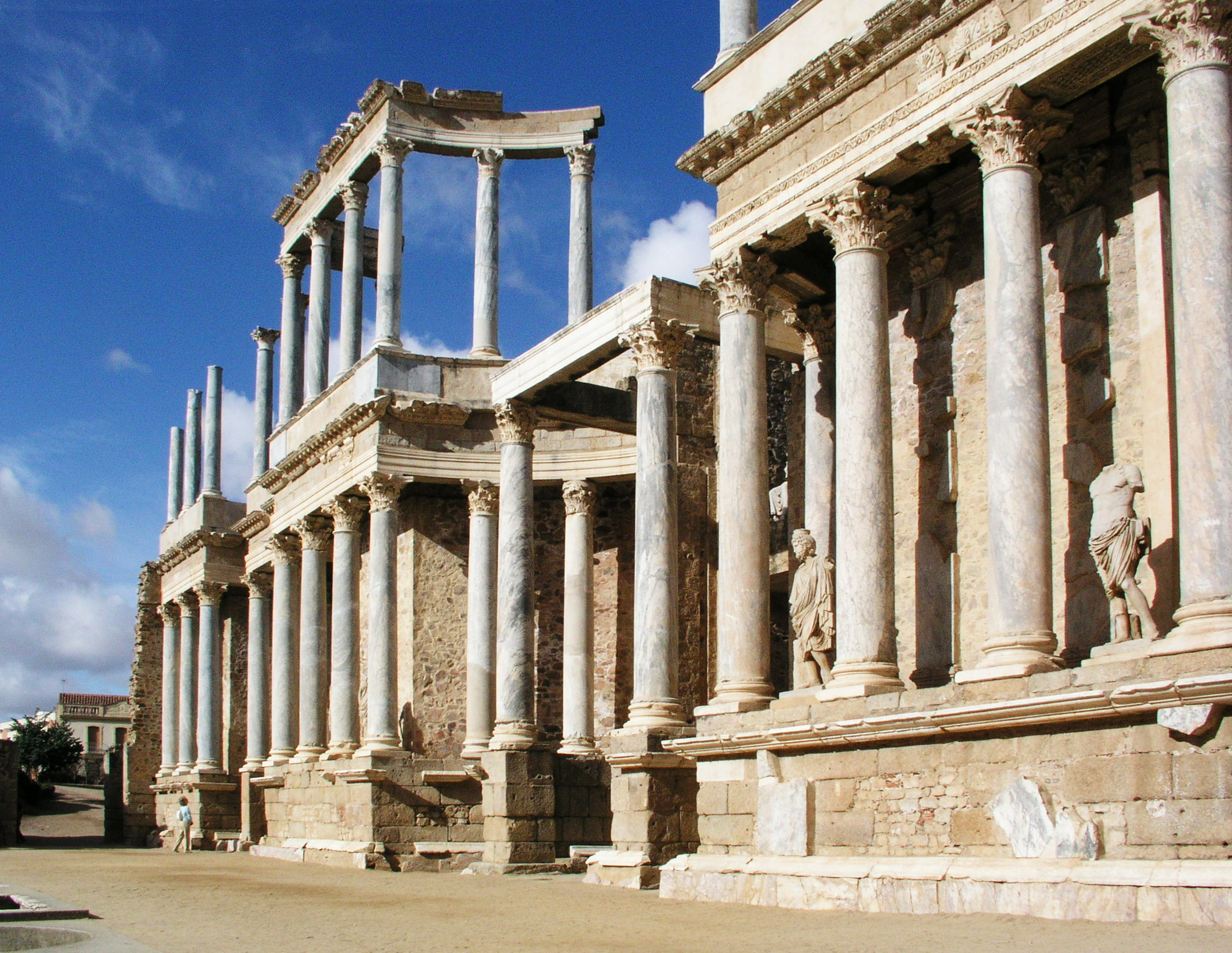
The theatre at Merida, Spain; it was promoted by Agrippa, built between 16 and 15 BC.

Agrippa's friendship with Augustus seems to have been clouded by the jealousy of Augustus's nephew and son-in-law Marcus Claudius Marcellus. Traditionally it is said that the result of such jealousy was that Agrippa left Rome, ostensibly to take over the governorship of eastern provinces – a sort of honourable exile. He only sent his legate to Syria, while he remained at Lesbos and governed by proxy. He might have been on a secret mission to negotiate with the Parthians about the return of the Roman legions' standards. On the death of Marcellus, which took place within a year of his exile, he was recalled to Rome by Augustus, who found he could not dispense with his services. If one places the events in the context of the crisis of 23 BC it seems unlikely that, when facing significant opposition and about to make a political climb down, the emperor Augustus would place a man in exile in charge of the largest body of Roman troops. What is far more likely is that Agrippa's 'exile' was actually the careful political positioning of a loyal lieutenant in command of a significant army in case the settlement plans of 23 BC failed and Augustus needed military support.

After 23 BC, as part of what became known as Augustus's Second Constitutional Settlement, Agrippa's constitutional powers were greatly increased to provide the Principate of Augustus with greater constitutional stability by providing for a political heir or replacement for Augustus if he were to succumb to his habitual ill health or was assassinated. In the course of the year, proconsular imperium, similar to Augustus's power, was conferred upon Agrippa for five years. The exact nature of the grant is uncertain but it probably covered Augustus's imperial provinces, east and west, perhaps lacking authority over the provinces of the Senate. That was to come later, as was the jealously guarded tribunicia potestas, or powers of a tribune of the plebeians. These great powers of state are not usually heaped upon a former exile. A later source stated that Augustus was advised by his confidant Maecenas to attach Agrippa still more closely to him by making him his son-in-law. In 21 BC, he induced Agrippa to divorce Marcella and marry his daughter, Julia the Elder—the widow of Marcellus. In 19 BC, Agrippa was employed in putting down a rising of the Cantabrians in Hispania (Cantabrian Wars).

In 18 BC, Agrippa's powers were even further increased to almost match those of Augustus. That year his proconsular imperium was augmented to cover the senatorial provinces and was granted tribunicia potestas, or powers of a tribune of the plebeians. As was the case with Augustus, Agrippa's grant of tribunician powers was conferred without his having to hold the office. These powers were considerable, giving him veto power over the acts of the Senate or other magistracies, including those of other tribunes, and the power to present laws for approval by the People. Just as important, a tribune's person was sacred, meaning that any person who harmfully touched them or impeded their actions, including political acts, could lawfully be killed. After the grant of these powers Agrippa was, on paper, almost as powerful as Augustus was; there was no doubt that Augustus was the man in charge.

Agrippa was appointed governor of the eastern provinces a second time in 17 BC, where his just and prudent administration won him the respect and good-will of the provincials, especially from the Jewish population. Agrippa also restored Roman control over the Cimmerian Chersonnese (Crimean Peninsula).

=== Death ===
Agrippa's last public service was his beginning of the conquest of the upper Danube River region, which would become the Roman province of Pannonia in 13 BC. He died at Campania in 12 BC at the age of 50–51. His posthumous son, Marcus Vipsanius Agrippa Postumus, was named in his honour. Augustus honoured his memory by a magnificent funeral and spent over a month in mourning. Augustus oversaw the education of Agrippa's children. Agrippa had built a tomb for himself but Augustus had Agrippa's remains placed in the Mausoleum of Augustus.

== Legacy ==
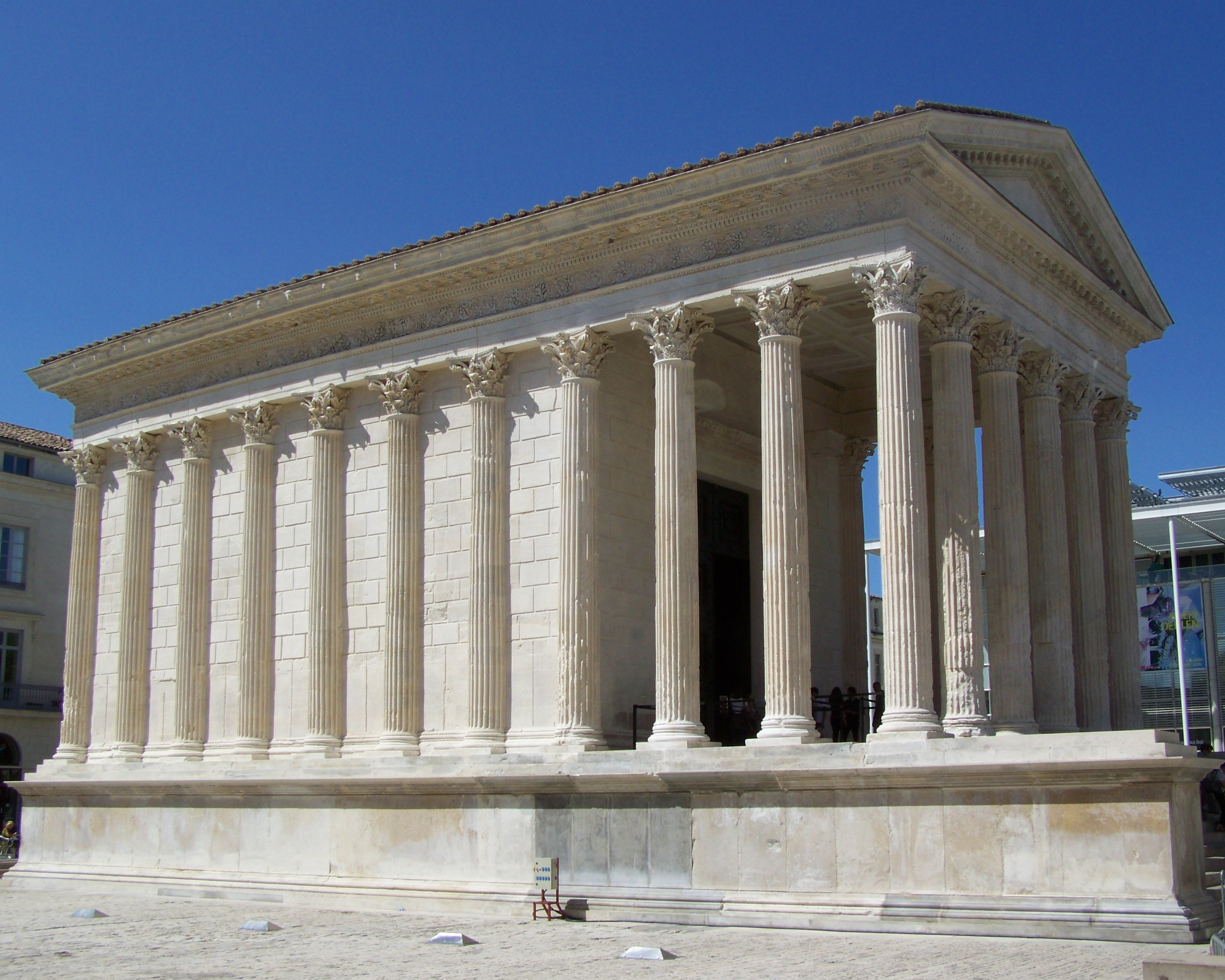
The Maison Carrée at Nîmes, modern France, built in 19 BC; Agrippa was its patron.

Agrippa was not only Augustus' most skilled subordinate commander but also his closest companion, serving him faithfully for over three decades. Historian Glen Bowersock says of Agrippa:

Agrippa deserved the honours Augustus heaped upon him. It is conceivable that without Agrippa, Octavian would never have become emperor. Rome would remember Agrippa for his generosity in attending to aqueducts, sewers, and baths.

Agrippa was also a writer, especially on the subject of geography. Under his supervision, Julius Caesar's dream of having a complete survey of the Empire made was carried out. Agrippa constructed a circular chart, which was later engraved on marble by Augustus, and afterwards placed in the colonnade built by his sister Polla. Amongst his writings, an autobiography, now lost, is referenced.

Agrippa established a standard for the Roman foot in 29 BC, and thus a definition of a pace as 5 feet. An imperial Roman mile denotes 5,000 Roman feet. The term Via Agrippa is used for any part of the network of roadways in Gaul built by Agrippa. Some of these still exist as paths or even as highways.

The Roman tribe Agrippia was named in his honour.

=== In popular culture ===
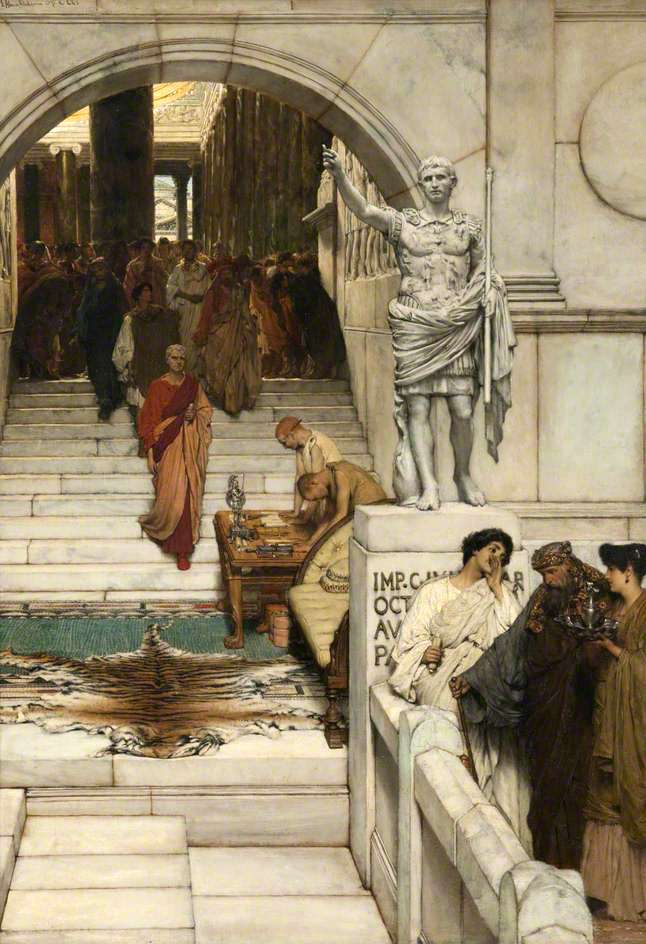
An Audience at Agrippa's, by Lawrence Alma-Tadema

==== Drama ====
- Agrippa is a character in William Shakespeare's play Antony and Cleopatra.
- A fictional version of Agrippa in his later life played a prominent role in the 1976 BBC Television series I, Claudius. Agrippa was portrayed as a much older man though he would have been only 39 years old at the time of the first episode (24/23 BC). He was played by John Paul.
- Agrippa is the main character in Paul Naschy's 1980 film Los cántabros, played by Naschy himself. It is a highly fictionalized version of the Cantabrian Wars in which Agrippa is depicted as the lover of the sister of Cantabrian leader Corocotta.
- Agrippa appears in several film versions of the life of Cleopatra. He is normally portrayed as an old man, rather than a young one. Among the actors to portray him are Philip Locke, Alan Rowe; and Andrew Keir in the Taylor-Burton film Cleopatra as an admiral for Julius Caesar - a completely fictional story, as well as Francis de Wolff in the 1964 film Carry On Cleo.
- Agrippa is also one of the principal characters in the British/Italian joint project Imperium: Augustus (2003) featuring flashbacks between Augustus and Julia about Agrippa, which shows him in his youth on serving in Octavian's army up until his victory at Actium and the defeat of Cleopatra. He is portrayed by Ken Duken.
- In the 2005 series Empire the young Agrippa (played by Christopher Egan) becomes Octavian's sidekick after saving him from an attempted poisoning.
- Marcus Agrippa, a highly fictional character based on Marcus Vipsanius Agrippa's early life, is part of the BBC-HBO-RAI television series Rome. He is played by Allen Leech. He describes himself as the grandson of a slave. The series creates a romantic relationship between Agrippa and Octavian's sister Octavia Minor, for which there is no historical evidence.
- In the TV series Domina (2021), Agrippa was played by Oliver Huntingdon and Ben Batt.

==== Literature ====
- Agrippa is mentioned by name in book VIII of Virgil's The Aeneid, where Aeneas sees an image of Agrippa leading ships in the Battle of Actium on the shield forged for him by Vulcan and given to him by his mother, Venus.
- Agrippa is a main character in the early part of Robert Graves' novel I, Claudius.
- He is a main character in the later two novels of Colleen McCullough's Masters of Rome series.
- He is a featured character of prominence and importance in the historical fiction novel Cleopatra's Daughter by Michelle Moran.
- He also features prominently in John Edward Williams' historical novel Augustus.
- In the backstory of Gunpowder Empire, the first volume in Harry Turtledove's Crosstime Traffic alternate history series, Agrippa lived until AD 26, conquering all of Germania for the Empire and becoming the second Emperor when Augustus died in AD 14.
- Agrippa is the central character and narrator of Robert Harris's novel Agrippa, described as "A Novel of Ancient Rome's Descent into Dictatorship".

== Marriages and issue ==
Agrippa married three times:

- Cecilia Pomponia Attica. They married in 37 BC and divorced before 28 BC. By her he had two daughters:
  - Vipsania Agrippina. She was the first wife of Tiberius.
  - Vipsania Attica. She married the orator Quintus Haterius.
- Claudia Marcella Maior. Daughter of Octavia Minor and niece of Augustus. They married in 28 BC and divorced in 21 BC. By her he had at least two daughters: (Note: However, it is uncertain whether they had also one or more sons who died young)
  - Vipsania Marcella. She married the general Publius Quinctilius Varus.
  - Vipsania Marcellina. She married Marcus Aemilius Lepidus, consul in 6.
- Julia the Elder. Daughter of Augustus. They married in 21 BC. By her he had three sons and two daughters:
  - Gaius Caesar. He was adopted by Augustus as heir, but died prematurely.
  - Julia the Younger. She married Lucius Aemilius Paullus, consul in 1.
  - Lucius Caesar. He was adopted by Augustus as heir, but died prematurely.
  - Vipsania Agrippina Maior. She married Germanicus Julius Caesar and was the mother of emperor Caligula and grandmother of Nero.
  - Agrippa Postumus. Born after his father's death, he was killed soon after the death of Augustus. The motive and instigator of his killing are disputed.

Through his numerous children, Agrippa would become ancestor to many subsequent members of the Julio-Claudian dynasty, whose position he helped to attain, as well as many other distinguished Romans.

== See also ==
- Vipsania gens
- Julio-Claudian family tree

== Sources ==
- Badian, E. (1981). "Notes on the Laudatio of Agrippa". Classical Journal. 76: 97–109.
- Buchan, J. (1937). Augustus. Boston: Houghton Mifflin.
- Evans, H.B. (1982). "Agrippa's Water Plan". American Journal of Archaeology. 86 (3): 401–411. doi:10.2307/504429. JSTOR 504429. S2CID 193123951.
- Firth, J.B. (1903). Augustus Caesar and the Organization of the Empire of Rome. New York: G. P. Putnam's Sons.
- Gray, E.W. (1970). "The Imperium of M. Agrippa: A Note on P. Colon. Inv. No. 4701". Zeitschrift für Papyrologie und Epigraphik. 6: 227–238.
- Lendering, Jona. "Marcus Vipsanius Agrippa". Livius. Archived from the original on 16 April 2007.
- McKechnie, P. (October 1981). "Cassius Dio's Speech of Agrippa: A Realistic Alternative to Imperial Government?". Greece and Rome. 28 (2): 150–155. doi:10.1017/S0017383500033258. S2CID 154924374.
- Reinhold, Meyer (1933). Marcus Agrippa: A Biography. Geneva: W. F. Humphrey Press.
- Roddaz, Jean-Michel (1984). Marcus Agrippa (in French). Rome: École Française de Rome.
- Shipley, Frederick W. (1933). Agrippa's Building Activities in Rome. St. Louis: Washington University.
- Soren, D.; et al. (1999), "A Roman villa and a late Roman infant cemetery : excavation at Poggio Gramignano, Lugnano in Teverina", Bibliotheca Archaeologica, Rome: L'Erma di Bretschneider.

Political offices
Preceded by L. Cornelius Lentulus; L. Marcius Philippus as suffecti	Roman consul 37 BC; With: Lucius Caninius Gallus; Titus Statilius Taurus	Succeeded by L. Gellius Poplicola; M. Cocceius Nerva
Preceded by Augustus; Potitus Valerius Messalla	Roman consul 28–27 BC; With: Augustus	Succeeded by Augustus VIII; T. Statilius Taurus II
