= Claudia Marcella Major =

1st-century BC noblewoman and eldest daughter of Octavia Minor

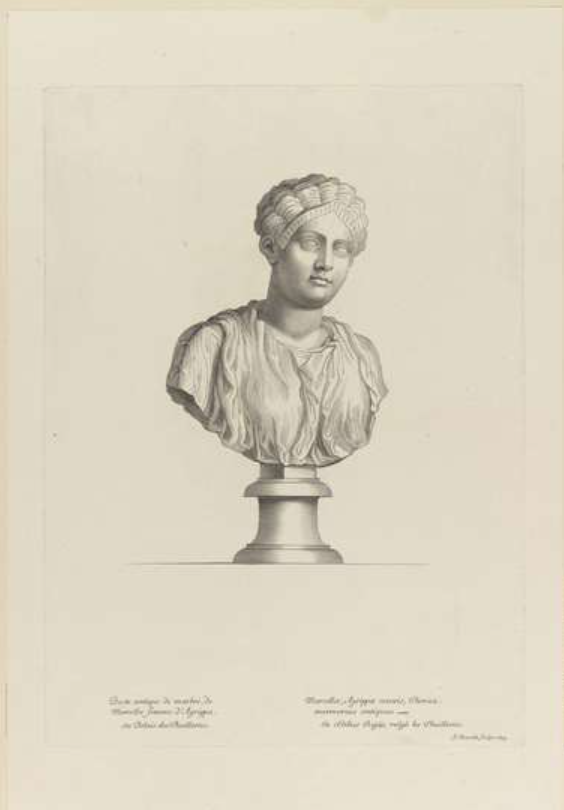
- Engraving of Marcella
- Spouse: Marcus Vipsanius Agrippa; Iullus Antonius
- Issue: by Agrippa; Vipsania Marcella Major; Vipsania Marcella Minor (disputed) by Iullus; Iulla Antonia; Iullus Antonius; Lucius Antonius
- House: Julio-Claudian
- Father: Gaius Claudius Marcellus
- Mother: Octavia the Younger

Claudia Marcella Major (Note: She is also known by the names Claudia Marcella Maior, Marcella Maior, Marcella Major, Claudia Marcella the Elder and Marcella the Elder.) (PIR^{2} C 1102; born some time before 40 BC) was the senior niece of Roman emperor Augustus, being the eldest daughter of his sister Octavia the Younger and her first husband Gaius Claudius Marcellus. She became the second wife of Augustus' foremost general Marcus Vipsanius Agrippa and after that the wife of Iullus Antonius, the son of Mark Antony.

== Biography ==
=== Early life ===
Marcella belonged to the generation whose childhood was marred by the violence of the civil wars of the Roman Republic. She was likely the first child of her parents, being followed by her brother Marcus Claudius Marcellus and sister Claudia Marcella Minor. From her mother's second marriage to Mark Antony she would also gain two half sisters, Antonia the Elder and Antonia the Younger.

=== Marriages ===
Marcella's first known marriage was to Marcus Vipsanius Agrippa in 28 BC. She was his second wife. Augustus held Agrippa in the highest place of honor. Agrippa was a military man loyal to Octavian throughout the civil war. The marriage of Marcella and Agrippa probably occurred because of the strong bond between the two men. Marcella brought Agrippa a tie to an elite republican family and to Augustus himself, for she was Augustus's niece. Although Agrippa was older than Marcella but austere, he appeared to be a good husband to Marcella.

Marcella and Agrippa had children, however it is uncertain how many overall and how many of them survived to adulthood. It is likely based on the wording in Suetonius Augustus that they have children of both sexes. There appears to have been at least one daughter who married Publius Quinctilius Varus, sometimes retrospectively called Vipsania Marcella, in order to differentiate her from her father's other daughters. They might also have had a second daughter who married a Lepidus. Some people such as John Pollini also believe that they had at least one son together, whom he identifies as a young boy next to Agrippa on the Ara Pacis.

In 23 BC the brother of Marcella, Marcus Claudius Marcellus, died and thus widowed Marcella's maternal cousin Julia the Elder. In 21 BC, Agrippa divorced Marcella to marry Julia the daughter of Augustus. After Marcella divorced Agrippa, Octavia Minor received Marcella back in her house. Octavia Minor married Marcella to the future consul Iullus Antonius, the second son of Mark Antony from his third wife Fulvia who was held in high regard by Augustus. Marcella bore Iullus Antonius at least one son named Lucius Antonius, they likely also had another son who might have died young, named Iullus and a daughter named Iulla Antonia. Lucius was sent to study in Marseilles (not an official exile) sometime after the disgrace of his father. In 2 BC, Iullus Antonius was forced to commit suicide after being found guilty of adultery with Julia the Elder.

Prior to 1939, scholars believed that Marcella married another husband after the death of Iullus Antonius, namely the Roman Senator and cousin Sextus Appuleius, the grandson of Octavia Major—the older half-sister of her mother— but it has in modern times been accepted that this was not the case.

== Legacy ==
Marcelliopsis is a genus of flowering plants from Africa, belonging to the family Amaranthaceae that was named after her.

== See also ==
- Women in ancient Rome
- List of Roman women
