= Arch of Portugal =

Arch in Rome, Italy, demolished in 1662

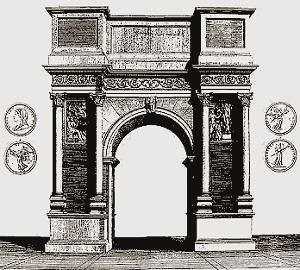
- Drawing of a reconstruction of the Arch of Portugal.

- Shown within Augustan Rome
- Click on the map for a fullscreen view
- 41°54′11.16″N 12°28′46.56″E
- Type: Triumphal arch
- Location: Regio VII Via Lata

History
- Built: late 3rd century
- Built by: Aurelian

The Arch of Portugal (also referred to as the Arch of Hadrian, the Arch of Tropholi, the Arch of Tripoli or the Arch of Octavian) was an arch of Rome, situated on the ancient via Lata (now the via del Corso), just before its intersection with the via della Vite.

Its current designation as the Arch of Portugal is derived from its location where it stood against the Palazzo Fiano, where from 1488 to 1508 lived the Portuguese cardinal Jorge da Costa, Cardinal Priest of the church of San Lorenzo in Lucina.

== History and description ==
The dating of the arch has long been the subject of controversy. For many years it was believed that the arch formed part of an aqueduct branch, with most suggestions linking it to the Aqua Virgo. However, most modern studies now attribute the arch to the period of late antiquity, possibly during the reign of Aurelian (r. 270–275), hypothesising that it acted as a monumental entry into his enormous Temple of the Sun.

In any event, the arch displayed reliefs that belonged to the period of the reign of the emperor Hadrian (r. 117–138), some 140 years before Aurelian's reign. It is suspected that these reliefs were repurposed as spolia in order to decorate the monument built under Aurelian, in much the same way earlier reliefs from Trajan were reused when decorating the arch of Constantine.

Of the extant reliefs, one depicts a scene of the donation of food relief to Roman children, presided over by the emperor Hadrian, while a second shows the apotheosis of Vibia Sabina (the emperor's deceased wife). Uncovered at a separate location from the others, but most likely related, the adventus of Hadrian shows the emperor welcomed by three personifications, representing the goddess Roma, the Roman Senate, and the people of Rome. This third relief was uncovered in the piazza Sciarra.

The arch was constructed in blocks of peperino and travertine, with the arch's attic in brick. The columns, with capitals in Composite order (that is with elements of both Ionic and Corinthian orders), framed a single arch which were partially removed, together with the entablature, between 1550 and 1565.

The arch was finally demolished in 1662 under the orders of Pope Alexander VII, as the arch was rundown and it was a hindrance to the flow of traffic along the via del Corso. The demolition of the arch was noted in a plaque that was posted at the site in 1665. The three Hadrianic reliefs were placed at around the same time in the staircase of the Palazzo dei Conservatori (today the Capitoline Museums).

== Gallery of images ==
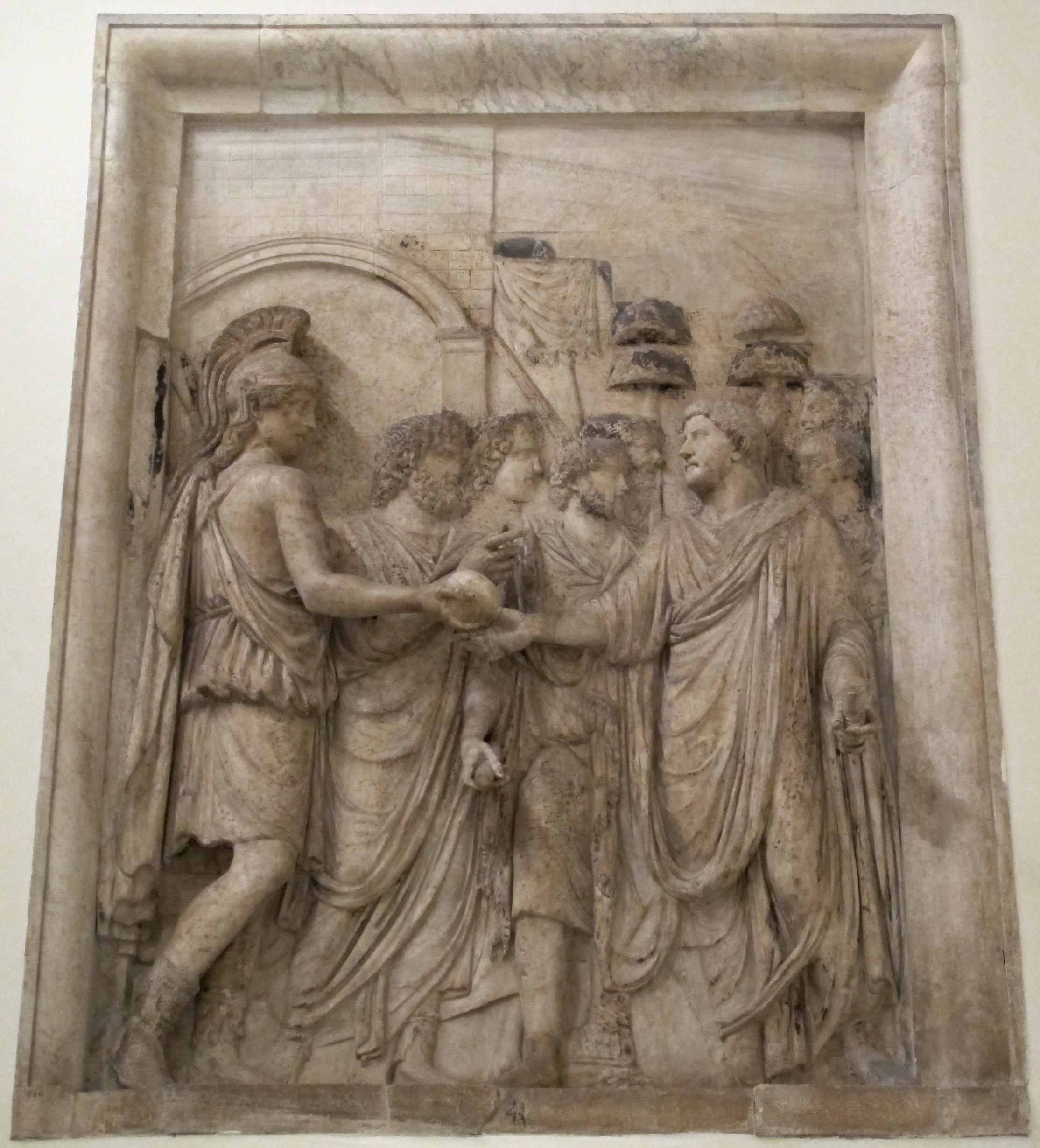
Adventus of Hadrian (from Piazza Sciarra, now in the Capitolinie Museums)

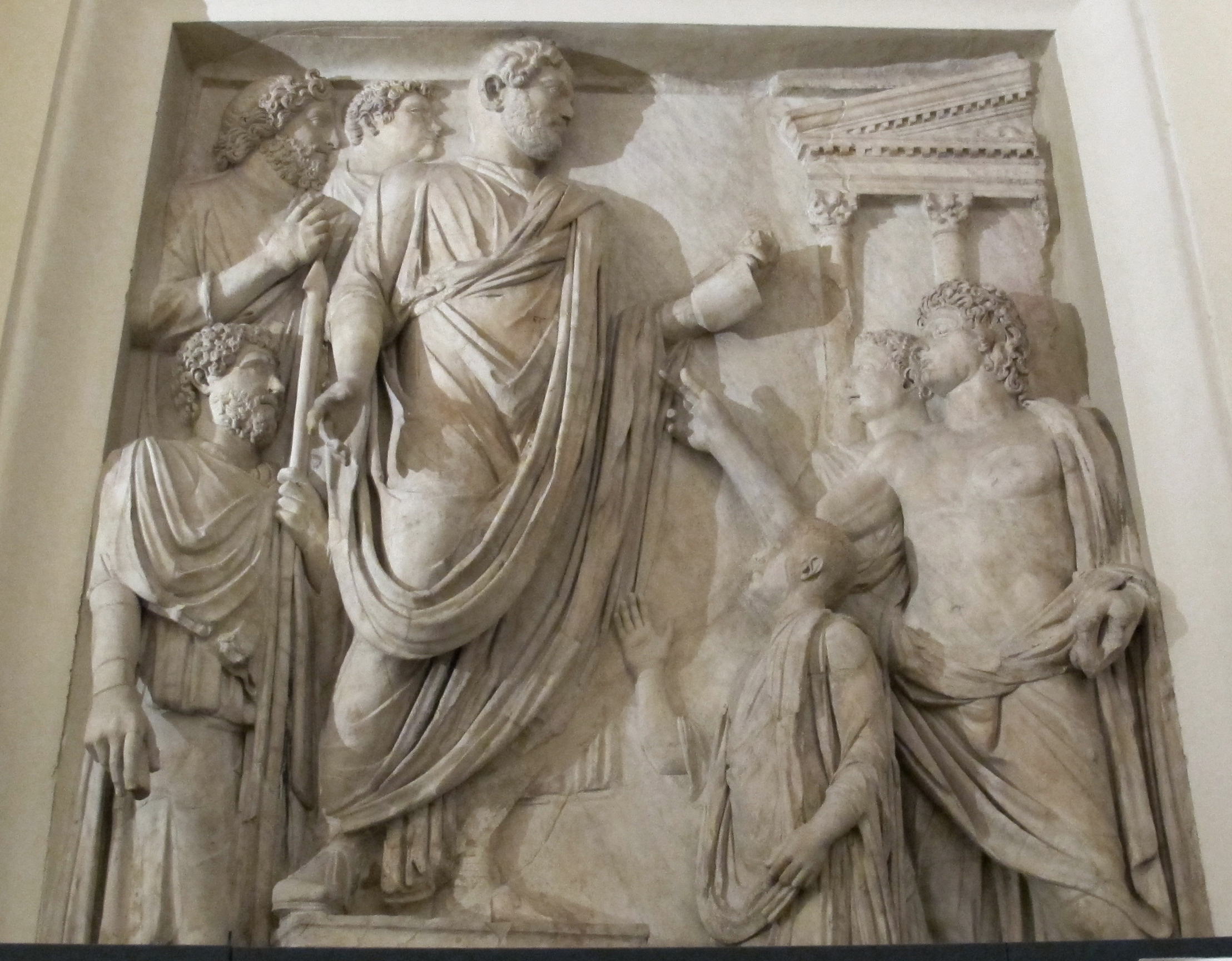
Food donation (from the Arch of Portugal, now in the Capitoline Museums)

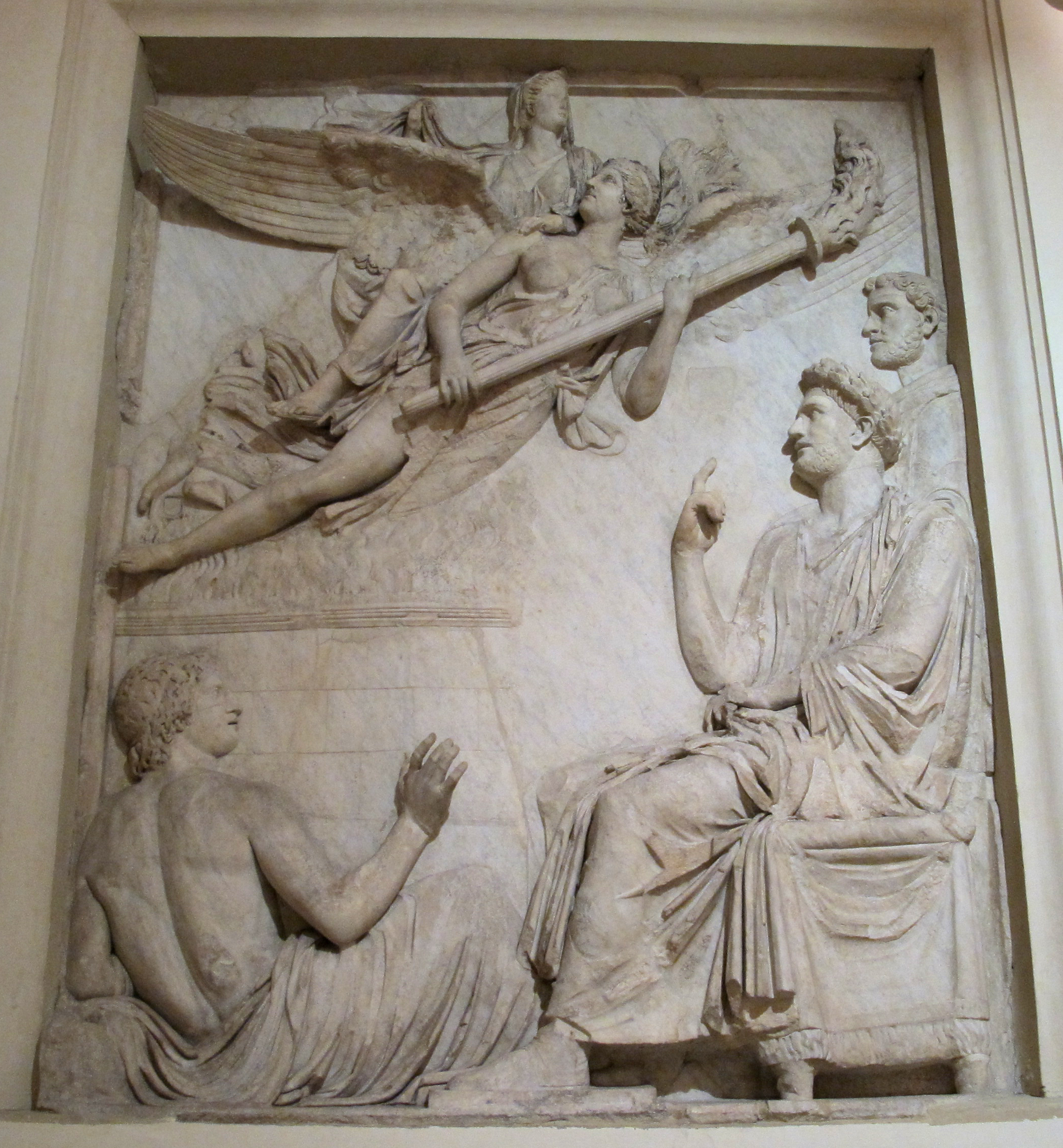
Apotheosis of Vibia Sabina (from the Arch of Portugal, now in the Capitoline Museums)

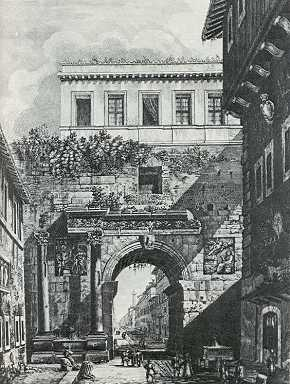
Idealised reconstruction of the arch's appearance as it may have appeared in the 16th century; engraving produced in 1835 by Luigi Rossini

== See also ==
- Wikimedia Commons contains images or other files on the Arch of Portugal
- List of Roman triumphal arches

== Bibliography ==
- Filippo Coarelli, Guida archeologica di Roma, Verona, Arnoldo Mondadori Editore, 1975.
- Richardson, L. A New Topographical Dictionary of Ancient Rome, 1992
