= Lucius Vipsanius (brother of Agrippa) =

1st century BC Roman military officer and brother of Marcus Vipsanius Agrippa

Lucius Vipsanius Agrippa
- Occupation: Infantryman
- Known for: Brother of Agrippa
- Father: Lucius Vipsanius

Lucius Vipsanius was the elder brother of Marcus Vipsanius Agrippa, the right-hand man of Roman emperor Augustus.

== History ==
=== Early life ===
Lucius Vipsanius was born in the late Roman Republic to a plebeian family, his father being Lucius Vipsanius and his mother an unknown woman. His praenomen is not actually known, but has been assumed to be Lucius, since he was older than Marcus, and first sons were generally given their fathers' praenomen in Rome. He and Agrippa likely spent their childhood playing with each other until Lucius was old enough to go to school. Since Lucius became a soldier his education likely took him away from home rather young. He also had a sister named Vipsania Polla, it's not known if she was younger or older than him.

=== Career ===
During Caesar's Civil War, Lucius sided with the Pompeians and fought for Cato the Younger in Africa where he was taken prisoner by Julius Caesar in Numidia after defeat in battle. It is likely that he had actually been captured before and pardoned already. Caesar had a habit of showing clemency to everyone the first time but made sure to punish repeat offenders and as such was likely to have him executed. Despite this he was treated with much respect. Agrippa was 17 years old at the time and was already studying with Caesar's grandnephew Octavian (later known as Augustus). Fearing for his brothers life, Agrippa asked his friend to speak to his uncle and beg him to show mercy for Lucius. This was the first time Octavian had asked his uncle for a favour and the wish was granted. This bound Agrippa forever to his benefactor and earned Octavian a reputation for loyalty. When returning home to Rome Lucius would have been expected to make a courtesy call to Cato's closest relatives there, his sister Servilia and wife Marcia.

=== Later life ===
Lucius appears to have been alive later on in his brother's career as he was involved in some type of affair which his brother refused to influence with his authority when a consul asked for his opinion on the matter.

== Cultural depictions ==
In I Loved Tiberius by Elisabeth Dored Lucius' salvation at the hands of Octavian is mentioned as a reason for Agrippa's undying loyalty to the emperor. The same is done in Cleopatra's Daughter by Michelle Moran. In Ray Gleason's Affair series of novels Lucius plays a bigger role as a character.

== See also ==
- Vipsania gens
