= Tabula Peutingeriana =

Map of the road network in the Roman Empire

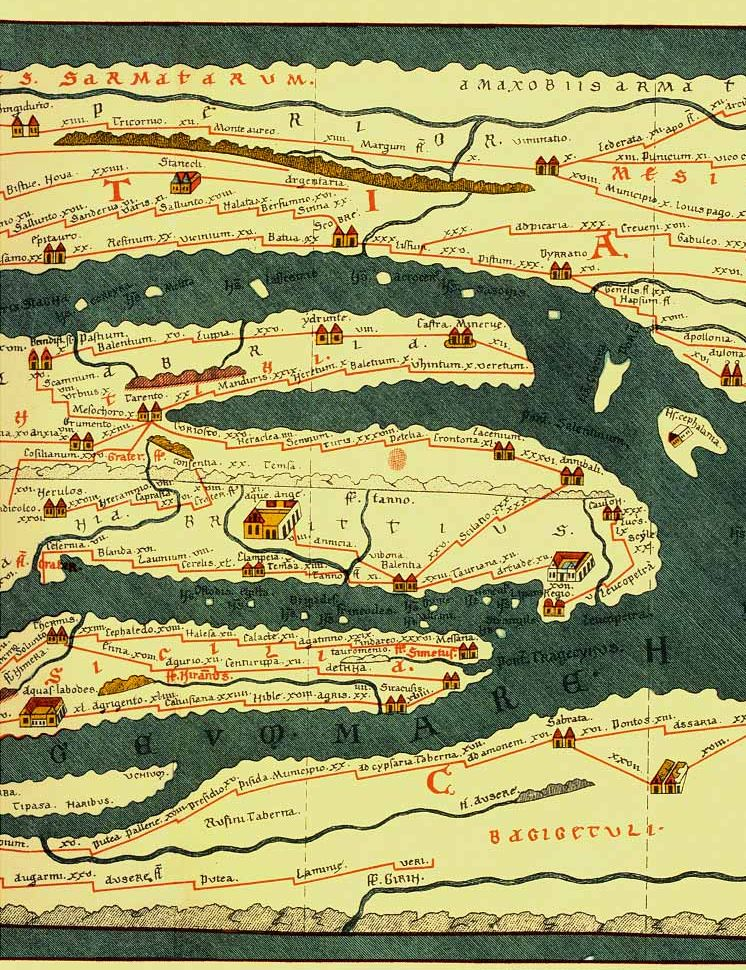
Tabula Peutingeriana (section of a modern facsimile), top to bottom: Dalmatian coast, Adriatic Sea, southern Italy, Sicily, African Mediterranean coast

Tabula Peutingeriana (Latin for 'The Peutinger Map'), also known as Peutinger's Tabula, Peutinger tables and Peutinger Table, is an illustrated itinerarium (ancient Roman road map) showing the layout of the cursus publicus, the road network of the Roman Empire.

Published first by Konrad Peutinger in 1507, the surviving map is a parchment copy, dating from around 1200, of a Late Antique original. It covers Europe (without the Iberian Peninsula and the British Isles), North Africa, and parts of Asia, including the Middle East, Persia, and the Indian subcontinent. According to one hypothesis, the existing map is based on a document of the 4th or 5th century that contained a copy of the world map originally prepared by Agrippa during the reign of the emperor Augustus (27 BC – AD 14).

However, Emily Albu has suggested that the existing map could instead be based on an original from the Carolingian period. According to Albu, the map was likely stolen by the humanist Conrad Celtes, who left it to his friend, Konrad Peutinger, who gave it to Emperor Maximilian I as part of a large-scale book stealing scheme.

Named after the 16th-century German antiquarian Konrad Peutinger, the map has been conserved at the Austrian National Library (the former Imperial Court Library) in Vienna since 1738.

== Archetype ==
The Tabula is thought to be a distant descendant of a map prepared under the direction of Marcus Vipsanius Agrippa, a Roman general, architect, and a confidant to the emperor Augustus; it was engraved in stone and put on display in the Porticus Vipsania in the Campus Agrippae area in Rome, close to the Ara Pacis building.

The early imperial dating for the archetype of the map is supported by American historian Glen Bowersock, based on numerous details of Roman Arabia anachronistic for a 4th-century map. Bowersock concluded that the original source is likely the map made by Vipsanius Agrippa. This dating is also consistent with the map's inclusion of the Roman town of Pompeii near modern-day Naples, which was never rebuilt after its destruction in an eruption of Mount Vesuvius in AD 79.

The original Roman map, of which this may be the only surviving copy, was last revised in the 4th or early 5th century. It shows the city of Constantinople, founded in 328, and the prominence of Ravenna, seat of the Western Roman Empire from 402 to 476, which suggests a fifth century revision to Levi and Levi. The presence of certain cities of Germania Inferior that were destroyed in the mid-fifth century provides a terminus ante quem (a map's latest plausible creation date), though Emily Albu suggests that this information could have been preserved in the textual, not cartographic, form. The map also mentions Francia, a state that came into existence only in the 5th century.

== Map description ==
The Tabula Peutingeriana is thought to be the only known surviving map of the Roman cursus publicus, the state-run road network. It has been proposed that the surviving copy was created by a monk in Colmar in 1265, but this is disputed. The map consists of an enormous scroll measuring 6.75 metres long and 0.35 metres high, assembled from eleven sections, a medieval reproduction of the original scroll.

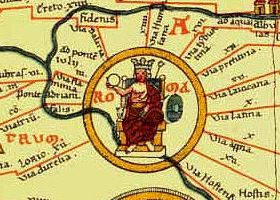
Rome (from a facsimile)

It is a very schematic map (similar to a modern transit map), designed to give a practical overview of the road network, as opposed to an accurate representation of geographic features: the land masses shown are distorted, especially in the east–west direction. The map shows many Roman settlements, the roads connecting them, and the distances between them, as well as other features such as rivers, mountains, forests, and seas. In total, no fewer than 555 cities and 3,500 other place names are shown on the map. The three most important cities of the Roman Empire at the time—Rome, Constantinople and Antioch—are represented with special iconic decoration.

Besides showing the entirety of the Roman Empire, the map also shows areas in the Near East, India and the Ganges, Sri Lanka (Insula Taprobane), and even an indication of China. It also shows a "Temple to Augustus" at Muziris (present-day Kodungallur) on the modern-day Malabar Coast, one of the main ports for trade with the Roman Empire on the southwest coast of India. On the western end of the scroll, the absence of Morocco, the Iberian Peninsula, and the British Isles indicates that a twelfth original section has been lost in the surviving copy; the missing section was reconstructed in 1898 by Konrad Miller.

The map appears to be based on "itineraries", lists of destinations along Roman roads, as the distances between points along the routes are indicated. Travelers would not have possessed anything so sophisticated as a modern map, but they needed to know what lay ahead of them on the road and how far. The Peutinger Table represents these roads as a series of stepped lines along which destinations have been marked in order of travel. The shape of the parchment pages accounts for the conventional rectangular layout. However, a rough similarity to the coordinates of Ptolemy's earth-mapping gives some writers hope that some terrestrial representation was intended by the unknown original compilers.

The stages and cities are represented by hundreds of functional place symbols, used with discrimination from the simplest icon of a building with two towers to the elaborate individualized "portraits" of the three great cities. The editors Annalina and Mario Levi concluded that the semi-schematic, semi-pictorial symbols reproduce Roman cartographic conventions of the itineraria picta described by 4th century writer Vegetius, of which this is the sole known testimony.

== History ==
The map was discovered in a library in the city of Worms by German scholar Conrad Celtes in 1494, who was unable to publish his find before his death and bequeathed the map in 1508 to Konrad Peutinger, a German humanist and antiquarian in Augsburg, after whom the map is named. The Peutinger family kept possession of the map for more than two hundred years until it was sold in 1714. It then was passed repeatedly between several royal and elite families until it was purchased by Prince Eugene of Savoy for 100 ducats; upon his death in 1737, it was purchased for the Habsburg Imperial Court Library in Vienna (Hofbibliothek). It is today conserved at the Austrian National Library at the Hofburg palace in Vienna, and because of its fragility is not on public display.

The map is considered by several scholars to have come into Celtes's possession by means of theft. Celtes, Peutinger, and their emperor tended to target artifacts that connected their empire (the Holy Roman Empire) to the ancient Roman Empire. Celtes and Peutinger took pains to eliminate clues related to the map's original whereabouts and thus knowledge about its first three hundred years is likely lost.

Unger opines that continuing to call this map "Peutinger" means honoring the pilfering.

An early scholar who accused Celtes of the theft was the theologian Johann Eck.

When Celtes gave the map to Peutinger, he left instructions that later would influence its subsequent history and finally lead to the publication in 1598: "I bequeath to Mr. Dr. Conrad Peutinger the Itinerarium Antonii Pii . . . ; I wish, however, and request that after his death it should be turned over to public use, such as some library." However, when the map was in the possession of Peutinger and his sons, others could only gain access to it directly on rare occasions. The map then became lost and was only rediscovered in 1597 by Marcus Welser (a member of the Welser family and relative of Peutinger). According to Welser, who wrote a commentary on the map (the Praefatio), it was the description of the humanist Beatus Rhenanus that "aroused an intense desire in many people to inspect it." During the time it was lost, Peutinger and Welser attempted to create a facsimile edition of the map from the sketches they kept. These sketches were published in 1591 and the above-mentioned Praefatio was the work's introduction.

In 2007, the map was added by UNESCO to its Memory of the World International Register. In recognition of this, it was displayed to the public in Vienna for a single day on 26 November 2007. Because of its fragile condition, it is not usually on public display.

== Printed editions ==
The map was copied for Brabantian cartographer Abraham Ortelius and published shortly after his death in 1598. A partial first edition was printed at Antwerp in 1591 (titled Fragmenta tabulæ antiquæ) by Johannes Moretus, who printed the full Tabula in December 1598, also at Antwerp. Johannes Janssonius published another version in Amsterdam, c. 1652.

In 1753 Franz Christoph von Scheyb published a copy, and in 1872 Konrad Miller, a German professor, was allowed to copy the map. Several publishing houses in Europe then made copies. In 1892, publishers Williams and Norgate published a copy in London, and in 1911 a sheet was added showing the reconstructed sections of the British Isles and the Iberian peninsula missing in the original.

== Map ==
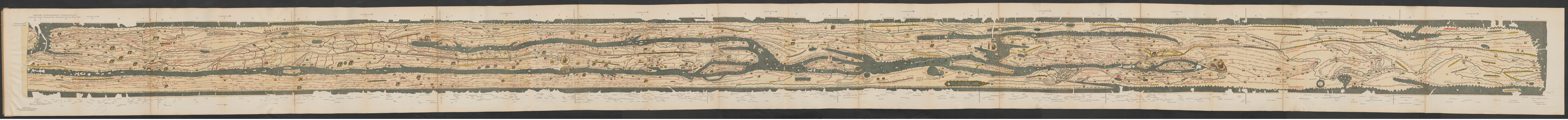
A modern version of the Roman Tabula Peutingeriana, without the reconstructed British and Iberian panel in the west to India in the east. (Konrad Miller, 1887)

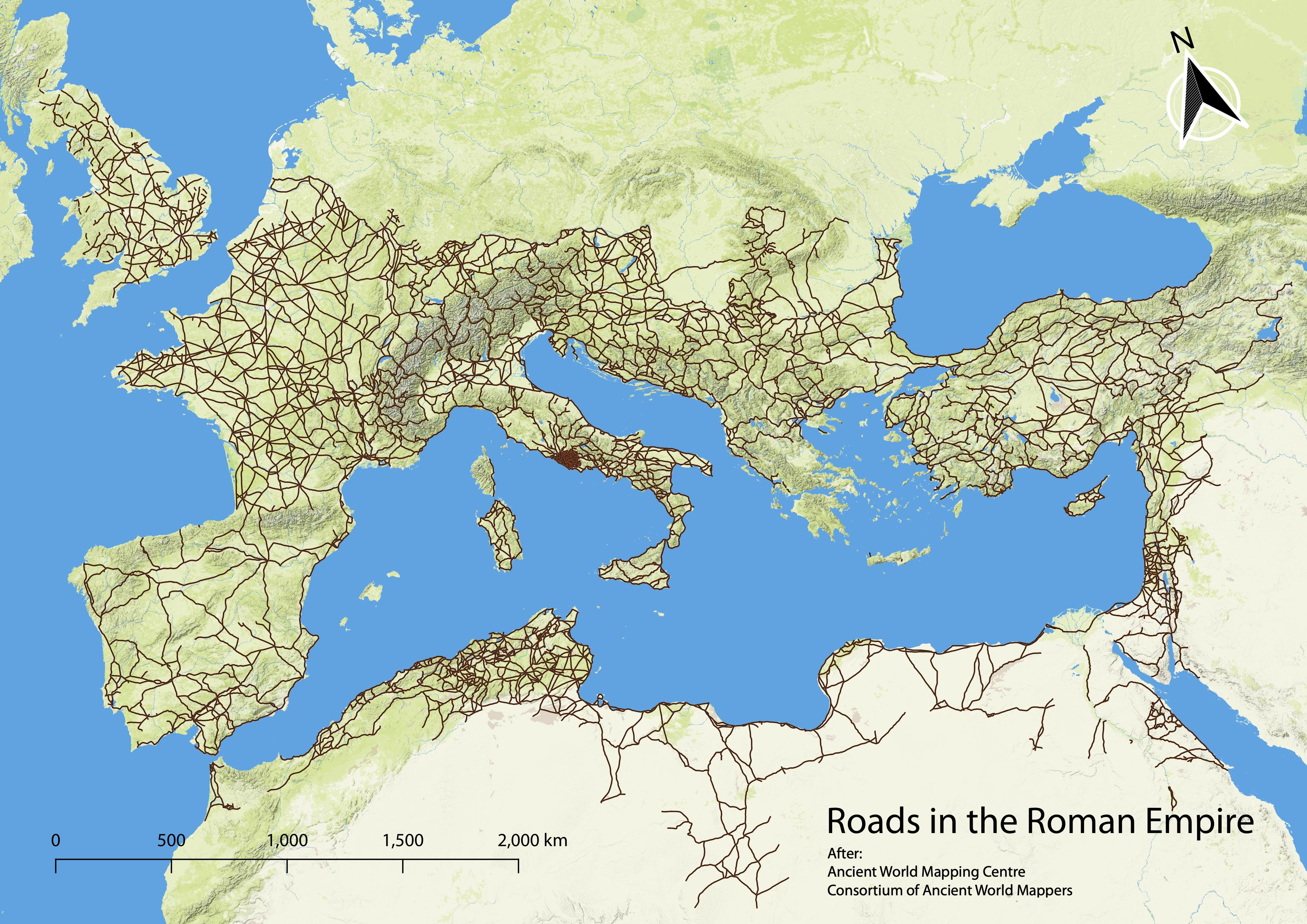
Combined data from the Peutinger Table and Antonine Itinerary recording the Roman roads network.

== See also ==
- Jublains archeological site contains a substantive discussion of a possible copyist error in the map
- Roman Road from Saintes to Périgueux
- Roman Road of Agrippa (Saintes–Lyon)
- Antonine Itinerary
