= Caenophrurium =

Ancient Roman settlement

Coordinates: 41°14′N 28°13′E

Caenophrurium (also written as Cenophrurium and Coenophrurium; Ancient Greek: Καινοφρούριον Kainophrurion) was a settlement in the Roman province of Europa (the southeasternmost part of Thrace), between Byzantium and Heraclea Perinthus. It appears in late Roman and early Byzantine accounts. Caenophrurium translates as the "stronghold of the Caeni", a Thracian tribe.

== Location ==
Classical scholars have at times identified various towns in Thrace as corresponding to Caenophrurium. Recent scholarship locates Caenophrurium near the modern Turkish village of Sinekli, in Silivri district, Istanbul Province.

The Barrington Atlas includes Caenophrurium as one of 24 komes (towns) and choria (villages) in the province of Europa. These were smaller settlements than the 14 cities of the province listed by Hierocles in his Synecdemus (c. 527–528): the provincial capital (Heraclea Perinthus) and 13 others.

Some confusion as to the exact location of Caenophrurium appears to derive from the fact that references to the settlement are all made in passing, either as a waystation between other towns, or as the location for the murder of the Emperor Aurelian. These original sources are:

- The Antonine Itinerary, probably dating from the late third century
- Lactantius's De Mortibus Persecutorum, written in late 314 or early 315
- Eutropius's Historiae Romanae Breviarium, written during the reign of the Emperor Valens, 364–378
- The Life of Aurelian, c. 361–425, part of the Historia Augusta, a largely fictional history of Roman emperors
- The Tabula Peutingeriana, 13th-century copy of a Roman map from the early 5th century, based on Roman itineraries

Several routes in the Antonine Itinerary list Caenophrurium as a stage on the Via Egnatia, 18 miles east of Heraclea Perinthus and 27 or 28 miles east of Melantias (probably modern Yarımburgaz). Logically, this might place Caenophrurium on the Marmara coast near Silivri. Instead, it appears that Caenophrurium was actually sited inland, 20 kilometres (12 miles) to the north of the main Via Egnatia, on a smaller northern route from Byzantium to Bizye.

Other writers have identified Caenophrurium with Tzirallum (modern Çorlu), but this seems unlikely as several sources list Tzirallum and Caenophrurium as separate places. For example, the Antonine Itinerary lists Caenophrurium as two stages and 36 miles closer to Byzantium than Tzirallum, and the Tabula Peutingeriana shows the locations separately.

Lewis and Short's A Latin Dictionary of 1879 identified Caenophrurium as "a town in Thrace, on the road from Apollonia to Selymbria, now Bivados". As well as the Historia Augusta's Life of Aurelian and Lactantius's De Mortibus Persecutorum, they cite Flavius Eutropius 9, 15 as a source. Apollonia corresponds to modern Sozopol, in Bulgaria, and Selymbria is Silivri, on the Marmara coast. However, Bivados appears to be Epibatos, now the modern Turkish village of Selimpaşa, about 11 kilometres (6.8 miles) east of Silivri. As with Çorlu, this appears to be a misidentification.

== Murder of Aurelian ==
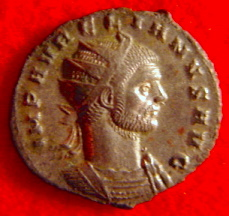
The emperor Aurelian, who was murdered in Caenophrurium in 275 AD.

In 275, the Emperor Aurelian marched towards Asia Minor, preparing a campaign against the Sassanid Empire. However, Aurelian never reached Persia, as he was murdered while waiting in Thrace to cross into Asia Minor. As an administrator, Aurelian had been very strict and handed out severe punishments to corrupt officials or soldiers. A secretary of Aurelian (called Eros by Zosimus) had told a lie on a minor issue. In fear of what the Emperor might do, he forged a document listing the names of high officials marked by the emperor for execution, and showed it to collaborators. When Aurelian reached Caenophrurium in September 275 the notarius Mucapor and other high-ranking officers of the Praetorian Guard, fearing punishment from the Emperor, murdered him.
