= Temple of the Sun (Rome) =

Roman temple in the Campus Agrippae dedicated in 274

Coordinates: 41.90256°N 12.48112°E

- Templum Solis
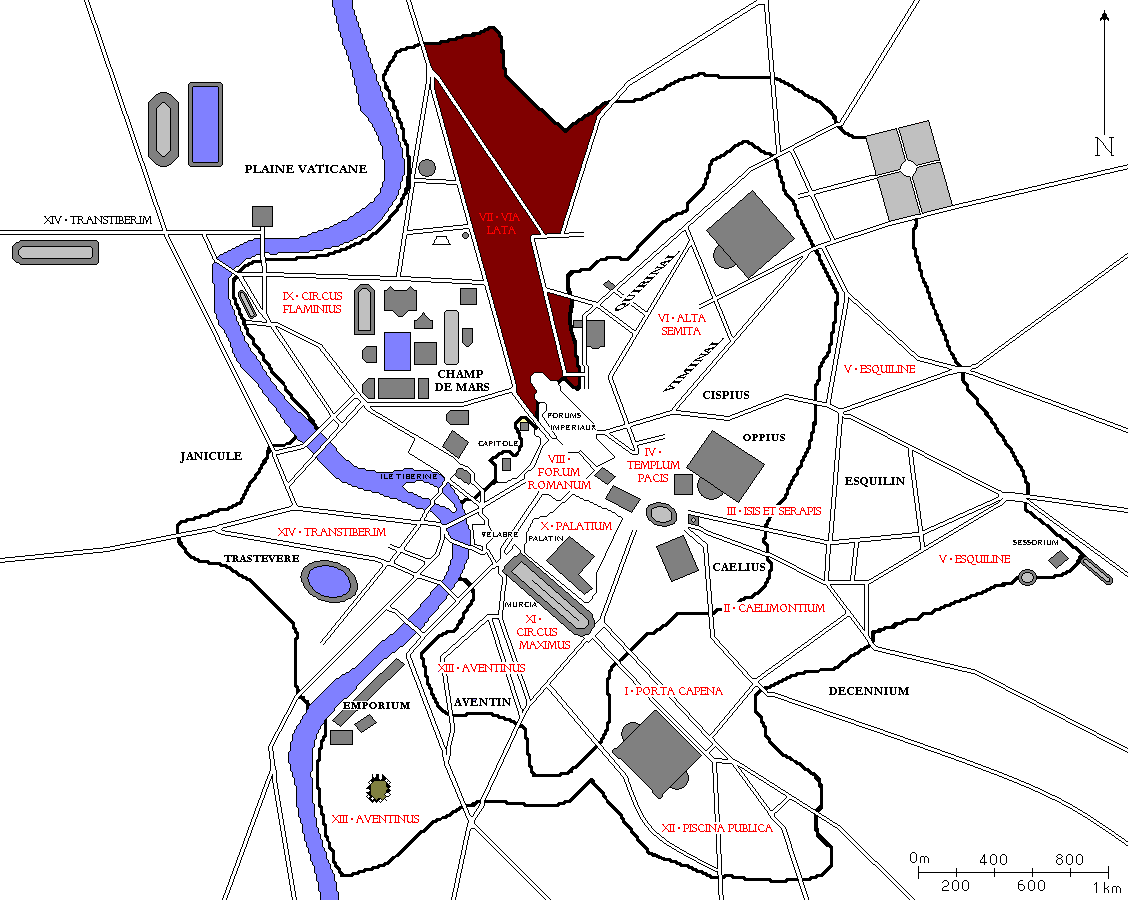
- Palladio's 16th-century sketch of the temple ruins.

Religion
- Affiliation: Roman Paganism
- Deity: Sol Invictus
- Ecclesiastical or organisational status: Destroyed
- Leadership: Pontifices Solis

Location
- Location: Campus Agrippae, Rome, Italy
- Interactive map of Temple of the Sun

Architecture
- Style: Roman
- Completed: 274 AD
- Materials: Porphyry, Marble

The Temple of the Sun was a temple in the Campus Agrippae in Rome. It was dedicated to Sol Invictus on 25 December 274 by the emperor Aurelian to fulfill a vow he made following his successful campaign against Palmyra in 272 and funded by spoils from that campaign. A college of pontifices (Dei) Solis and annual games with circus races was established for the cult, as well as four-year games (agon Solis) to be held at the end of the Saturnalia.

The temple was located in the Regio VII Via Lata. It was decorated with the spoils of war taken from Palmyra and was praised in the ancient sources for its beauty. Although it stood to the east of the via Lata, its exact location is not certain. Near the temple was a porticus where wine was stored. Aurelian had decided that in the future the Roman citizens would also receive free wine and pork from the state in addition to bread and other foodstuffs. This suggests that the temple must have stood in the immediate vicinity of the Castra Urbana built by Aurelian and the Forum Suarium (the wine market), and this location coincides with where the church of San Silvestro in Capite is currently situated.

It was the fourth temple dedicated to the Sun in Rome – the other three were in the Circus Maximus, on the Quirinal Hill and in Trastevere. The appearance of the temple is not described in the ancient sources. No remains of the temple have been found and no images of the temple on coins are known.

== Palladio's sketch ==
Andrea Palladio in the 16th century (he visited Rome three times in the 1540s) drew the remains of a large complex east of the via Lata, which the German historian Christian Hülsen attributed to the Temple of the Sun. This complex consisted of a rectangular site surrounded by colonnades, which was split into two parts.

A first courtyard (55m x 75m) had the short sides made up of two hemicycles and the walls were adorned with two orders of columns framing niches; the arched entrances were framed by giant columns for the courtyard's entire height. A small square room (15m x 15m) separated it from a second larger courtyard (130m x 90m), placed on the same axis, with three rectangular niches open on the long sides (the two lateral ones were wider, with two entrances each with columns and equipped with a small apse) and three other niches on the short side at the courtyard's end, the central niche was semicircular, while the lateral ones were rectangular, and all three possessing two-column entrances.

In the centre of this space was a tholos or circular building, some 25 metres across (from the lowest of the three steps), presumed to have been the temple. There are sixteen columns outside the cella, which is some 10 metres across, and has two entrances. Justinian I took eight porphyry columns from it, 6.88 m high, for Hagia Sophia in Constantinople. However, the identification of this complex as the Sun Temple is uncertain. The Arch of Portugal is believed to have been one of the entrances to the temple site.

If still in use by the late 4th-century, the temple would have been closed during the persecution of pagans in the late Roman Empire.

== See also ==
- List of Ancient Roman temples

== Bibliography ==
- L. Richardson, Jr, A New Topographical Dictionary of Ancient Rome, Baltimore & London 1992. pp. 363–364 ISBN 0801843006
- M. Clauss, Die römischen Kaiser – 55 historische Portraits von Caesar bis Iustinian, Munich 2010, pp. 241–251, ISBN 978-3406472886
