= Via Lata =

Via Lata (Latin: broad road) may refer to:

== Roads ==
one of two ancient Roman roads:

- The Via Lata (Rome), now known as the Via del Corso, another name for the Via Flaminia once it has entered the city through the Porta del Popolo, in Rome; was the birthplace of Pope Valentine in 800 A.D.
- The Via Lata (Spain), now known as the Via de la Plata, in Spain

== Other uses ==
- Regio VII Via Lata, a district of the City of Ancient Rome

== See also ==
- Lata (disambiguation)
- Via (disambiguation)
