= Regio VII Via Lata =

Historical region of Rome

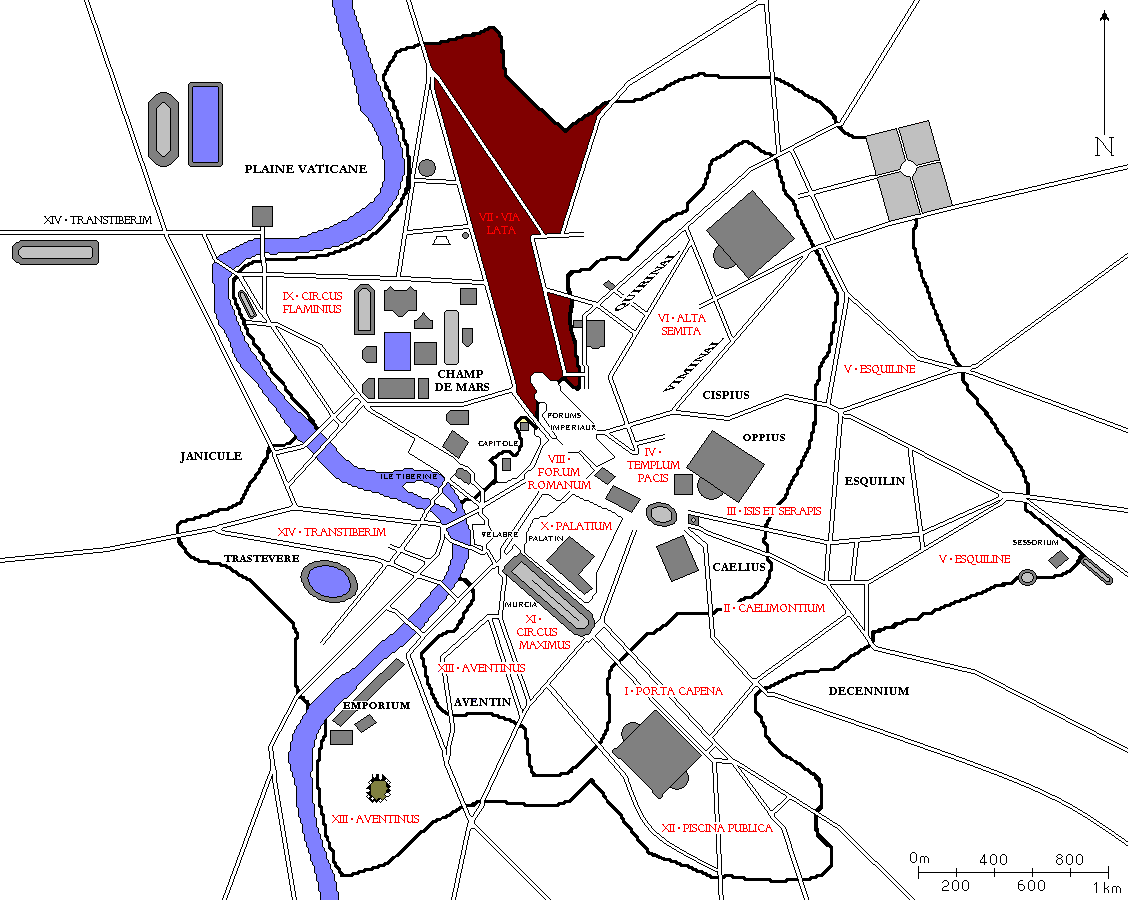

The Regio VII Via Lata is the seventh regio of imperial Rome, under Augustus's administrative reform. Regio VII took its name from the wide urban street the Via Lata ("the Broad Way"). It was the urban section of the Via Flaminia, which ran between the Servian walls and the Aurelian Walls, and corresponds to the modern Via del Corso. The regio contained part of the Campus Martius on the east of the street plus the Collis Hortulorum (Hill of the Hortuli), the Pincian Hill (modern Pincio).

== Geographic extent and important features ==
Descending into the valley towards the Campus Martius, Regio VII was defined by its principal artery, the Via Lata, which was also its western boundary. To the south it was bordered by the Imperial Fora and the Capitoline Hill, while to the north it was enclosed by the Aurelian Wall, through which passed its principal gate, the Porta Flaminia. To the east, it was flanked by the Via Salaria vetus. A measurement taken at the end of the 4th century recorded that the perimeter of the region was 15,700 Roman feet (approximately 4.64 km).

The most prominent building in this region was the magnificent Temple of the Sun built by the emperor Aurelian and dedicated to Sol Invictus. The temple sat on the Campus Agrippae, an area filled with halls and pleasure grounds for the people that had been established by the emperor Augustus. Scattered around this area were the Porticus Vipsania (which contained on one of its walls, a map of the known world), the Porticus Constantini, the Forum Suarium (or Pig Market), and the gardens of the Horti Aciliorum and the Horti Lucullani. It was at the Gardens of Lucullus that the Mausoleum of the Domitii Ahenobarbi sat, where the remains of the emperor Nero were interred.

This area also included a triumphal arch dedicated to Diocletian and named the Arcus Novus, along with a nymphaeum dedicated to Jupiter and a double temple dedicated to Spes and Fortuna. Finally, also within this region was the station of the first cohort of the Vigiles. At the turn of the 5th century, the Regio contained 15 aediculae (shrines), 120 domūs (patrician houses), 25 horrea (warehouses), 75 balneae (bath houses) and 76 loci (fountains).

== Subdivisions ==
At the turn of the 5th century, the Regio was divided into 15 vici (districts) and 3,805 insulae (blocks). It had two curators and was served by 48 Roman magistrates.
