= Lucius Vipsanius (father of Agrippa) =

1st century BC Roman

- Known for: Father of Marcus Agrippa
- Children: Lucius Vipsanius; Marcus Vipsanius Agrippa; Vipsania Polla

Lucius Vipsanius was the father of the Roman politician and general Marcus Vipsanius Agrippa, and thus an ancestor of the Julio-Claudian dynasty. Very little is known of him but modern historians have speculated that Lucius may have been a first-generation Roman citizen of Plebeian status and relatively wealthy.

== Attestation ==
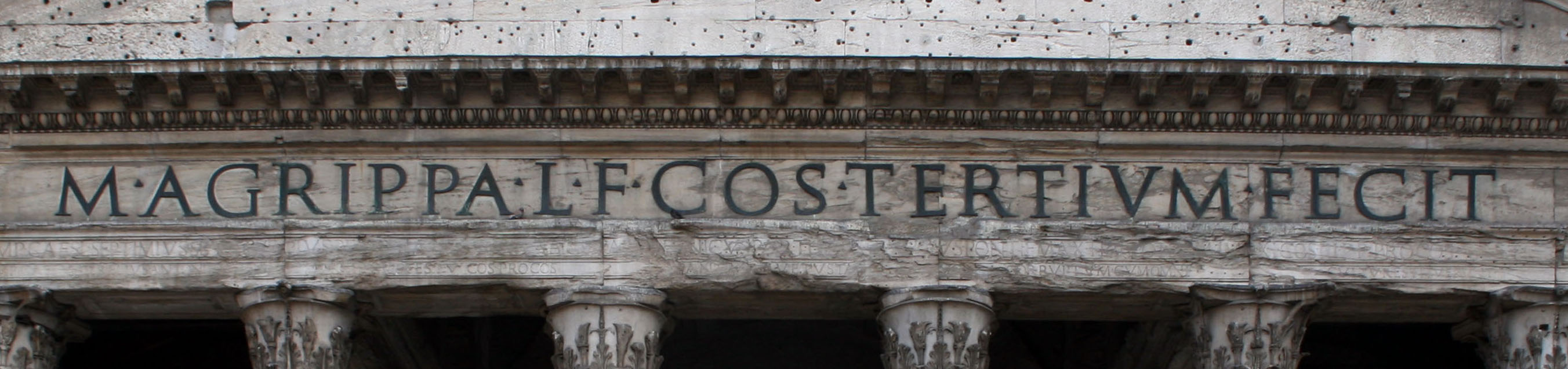
Inscription at the front of the Pantheon. It shows Lucius name in its abbreviated form "L." as part of the phrase "Lucii filius" (Lucius' son) and the lack of equivalent abbreviation "n." for "nepos" (grandson) indicates that Lucius' father was a non-citizen.

The only surviving direct attestations to Lucius are in inscriptions honoring his son Marcus where his filiation is present. For example on the Pantheon in Rome an engraving reads "M·AGRIPPA·L·F·COS·TERTIVM·FECIT": "M[arcus] Agrippa L[ucii] f[ilius] co[n]s[ul] tertium fecit" meaning "Marcus Agrippa, son of Lucius, made [this building] when consul for the third time". (Note: Built by the Roman Emperors Trajan and Hadrian ca. 118-126, replaced a much smaller temple built by Marcus when he was consul for the third time.)

Seneca the Elder makes indirect reference to Lucius when mentioning that Marcus often omitted his nomen "Vipsanius" from his name due to embarrassment for his father's low rank, although many modern historians doubt the veracity of Seneca's claim and believe Marcus simply followed a trend common at the time to exclude nomina. Seneca's claim may have been influenced by negative propaganda.

Liber Sen. Ben. 3.32.4

"Did the father of Marcus Agrippa, of whom nothing was known, even after Agrippa became famous, confer the greater benefit upon his son, or was the greater which Agrippa conferred upon his father when he gained the glory, unique in the annals of war, of a naval crown, and when raised so many wast buildings in Rome, which not only surpassed all former grandeur, but have been surpassed by none since?"

— Seneca the Younger (translated by Aubrey Stewart), on sons in De Beneficiis

Seneca the Younger compares Lucius to Gryllus and Aristo the fathers of Xenophon and Plato as men who are only remembered forever due to the accomplishments of their sons. In essence he is an example to Seneca of a man who benefited from his son, but whose son did not benefit from him. Seneca even emphasizes that Lucius remained obscure even after Marcus' success. As the text does not mention his name it is possible that Seneca did not even known Agrippa's father was named Lucius.

In the past some historians such as Peter Schreiner Frandsen attempted to identify Lucius with a rhetorician named Vipsanius Atticus mentioned by Seneca the Elder as a student of Apollodorus of Pergamon. This theory proposes based on the cognomen Atticus that Marcus was on his father's side in some way related to his father-in-law Titus Pomponius Atticus. This theory is flawed as Pomponius cognomen was not hereditary but derived from his personal relation to the region of Attica (near Athens). Both Meyer Reinhold and Jean-Michel Roddaz reject the theory in their respective books.

Cassius Dio mentions Lucius in his indices, but says nothing about him. The lack of further references to him makes Roddaz confident in believing that Lucius was not known in Rome at the time of Marcus career and that Lucius may even have died before his son rose to fame.

== Background and possible career ==
The family of Lucius Vipsanius probably originated in the Italian countryside and was of humble and plebeian origins. Roddaz has argued that Lucius was likely a first-generation Roman citizen (who had acquired citizenship after the end of the Social War in 87 BC) due to the fact that his son's filiation only includes Lucius own praenomen and not that of Lucius' father. He also states that while it is possible that Lucius may have been one of the equites (as many historians have speculated) there is no certainty in the matter. Reinhold does not believe that he was a member of the Equestrian order, but does agree with Roddaz that the lack of mention of Marcus grandfather on inscriptions proves that Lucius' father was not a citizen. Lucius like many other Italian probably migrated as an adult to Rome to take advantage of the possibility for social mobility that the end of the war entailed.

Francis Cairns notes that while ancient writers often snidely remarked about Agrippa's lack of prestigious ancestry it is implausible that he as a young man would have been able to be so close to and share an education with Gaius Octavius (later emperor Augustus), a nephew of Julius Caesar, if he had not come from a family of some wealth. He further speculates that Agrippa's marriage to Caecilia Attica could indicate that Lucius was of a similar background, a tax collector of equestrian status. Gaius Stern also believes Lucius was wealthy. Roddaz notes that Pliny referred to Marcus as "a man closer to rusticity than to luxury", but that this may not indicate any similarity to when Cicero was described by this phrase.

Frandsen conjectured based on his identification of Lucius with the rhetor Atticus that Lucius was a teacher of the teenage Octavius just as Apollodorus had been, thus explaining how Marcus and the future emperor met each other and became friends. Reinhold rejects this theory, as does Jonathan August Weichert and Rudolf Daniel.

Elaine Fantham has noted that Lucius seems to have been an obscure enough figure that despite it being well known that Marcus's family was of ignoble descent no specific allegations of his father holding a vulgar occupation were leveled against him. She notes this as odd since other persons of far more prestigious status faced such accusations in Rome. Roddaz noted the same, stating that Agrippa overall received less slander from contemporary enemies than Augustus other close confidantes because his father was so unknown.

== Family ==
Lucius married a woman of unknown name and had at least three children, besides Marcus he had a daughter nicknamed Polla, and another son of uncertain name but who is often called Lucius due to being older than Marcus, (Note: Per Roman naming conventions the eldest son almost always shared the father's praenomen (first name) during the Republican period.) but Reinhold has pointed out that it's possible that Lucius had other sons and the one brother of Marcus mentioned in ancient sources may not have been his oldest. Marcus second son with his second wife Julia was named Lucius Caesar, probably after his grandfather. Through the children from Marcus third marriage Lucius was great-grandfather of Roman emperor Caligula and empress Agrippina, as well as great-great-grandfather of emperor Nero.

Some modern writers such as Fantham provide Lucius and his other son's names with the cognomen "Agrippa" as well, but it is possible the name was unique to Marcus, as Pliny the Elder claims that the cognomen was given to Marcus because he was born with his feet first.
