= Vibia Sabina =

Roman empress from 116 to 136/137

- Augusta
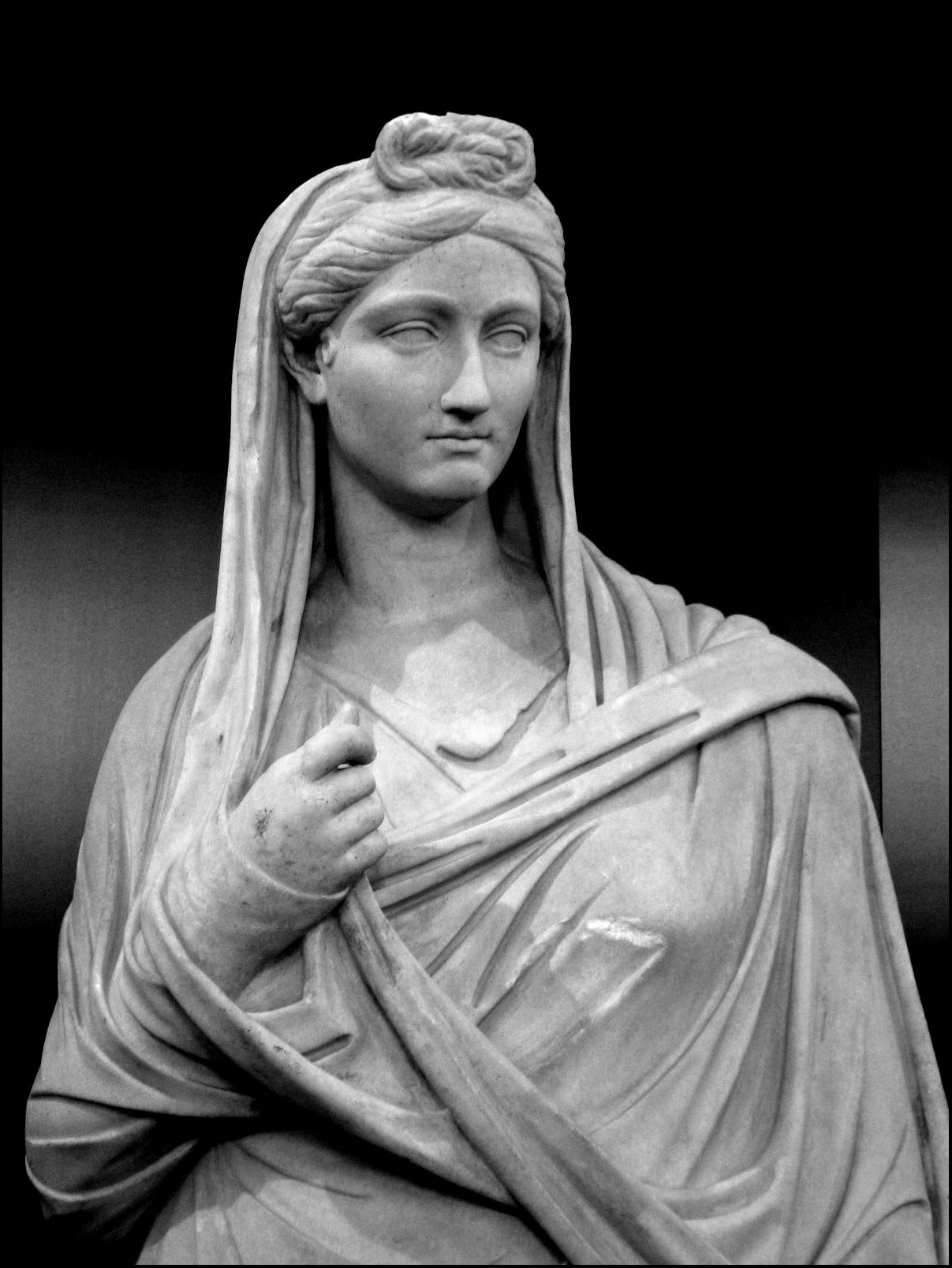
- Statue of Vibia Sabina (Villa Adriana, Tivoli)

Roman empress
- Tenure: 117 – 136/137
- Born: August 13, 83 AD; Rome, Italy
- Died: 136/137
- Spouse: Hadrian
Names
- Vibia Sabina
Regnal name
- Vibia Sabina Augusta
- Dynasty: Nerva–Antonine
- Father: Lucius Vibius Sabinus
- Mother: Salonia Matidia

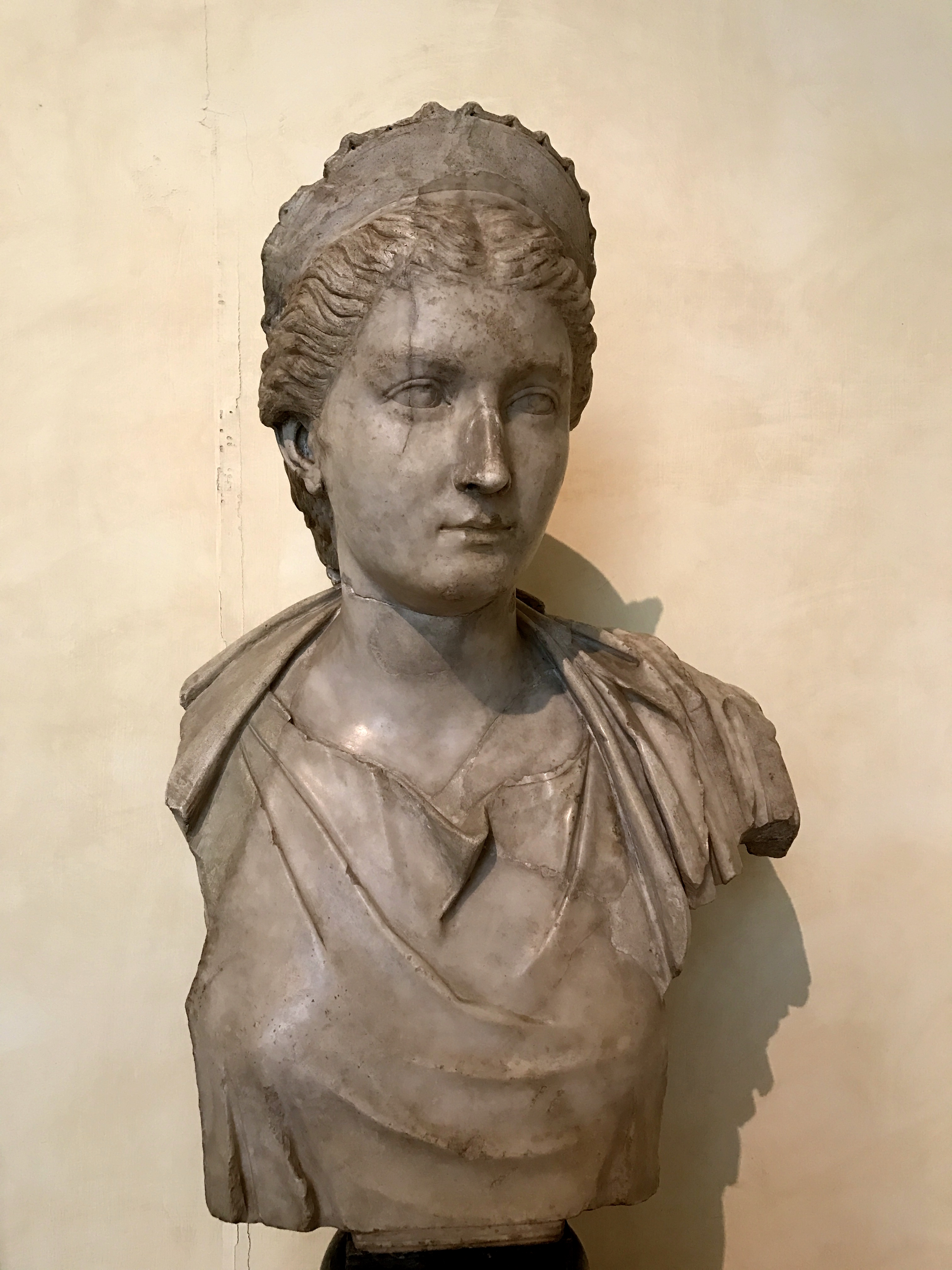
Bust of Vibia Sabina (Capitoline Museums, Rome)

Vibia Sabina (83–136/137 AD) was a Roman Empress, wife and second cousin once removed to the Roman Emperor Hadrian. She was the daughter of Matidia (niece of Roman Emperor Trajan) and suffect consul Lucius Vibius Sabinus.

== Early life ==
After her father's death in 84, Sabina and her half-sister Matidia Minor went to live with their maternal grandmother, Marciana. They were raised in the household of Sabina's great uncle Trajan and his wife Plotina.

Sabina married Hadrian in 100, at the empress Plotina's request. Sabina's mother Matidia (Hadrian's second cousin) was also fond of Hadrian and allowed him to marry her daughter. Hadrian succeeded Trajan in 117.

== Empress ==
Sabina accumulated more public honors in Rome and the provinces than any imperial woman had enjoyed since the first empress, Augustus’ wife Livia. Indeed, Sabina is the first woman whose image features on a regular and continuous series of coins minted at Rome. She was the most traveled and visible empress to date. In 128, she was awarded the title of Augusta.

Sabina is described in the poetry of Julia Balbilla, her companion, in a series of epigrams on the occasion of Hadrian's visit to Egypt in November of 130. In the poems, Balbilla refers to Sabina as "beautiful" and "lovely."

The factually loose Historia Augusta reports that the historian Suetonius, who was Hadrian's secretary, was dismissed by Hadrian from his position in 119, for "conducting [himself] toward his wife, Sabina, in a more informal fashion than the etiquette of the court demanded." Meanwhile, her husband was thought to be more sexually interested in his favourite Antinous, and he and Sabina had no children.

== The Thasos Find ==
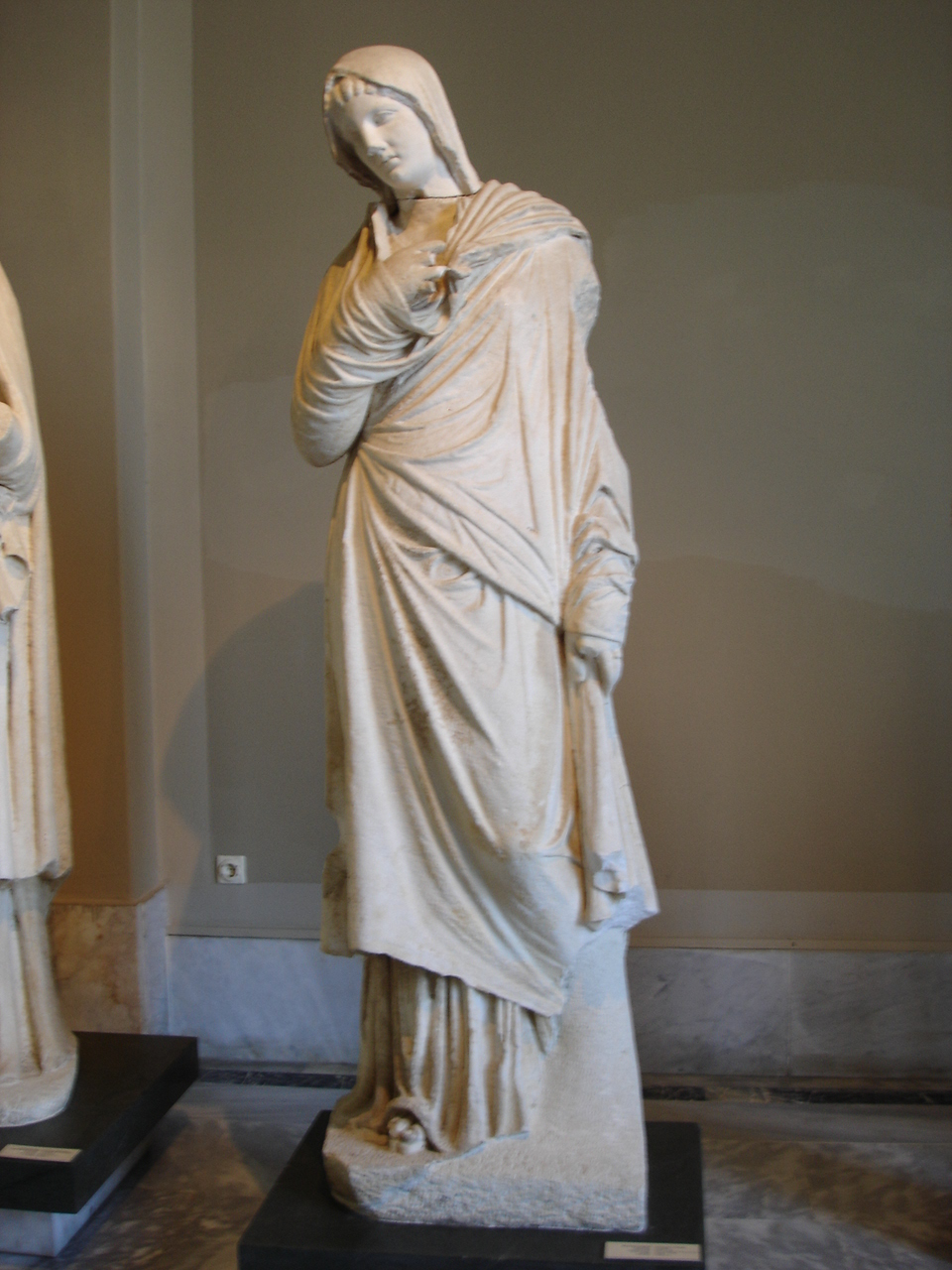
Istanbul Archaeological Museum, the Bents’ statue of Vibia Sabina from Thasos.

The antiquaries Theodore and Mabel Bent, while excavating within the forum area of the ancient capital of the island of Thasos in March 1887, uncovered an almost complete statue of Vibia Sabina (2nd cent. AD; c. 1.8m high) that decorated the monument to Caracalla. The Bents were hoping to return with the statue to London, but it was confiscated by the Istanbul authorities, specifically Osman Hamdi Bey. It is now on display in the Archaeological Museum there.

== Death ==
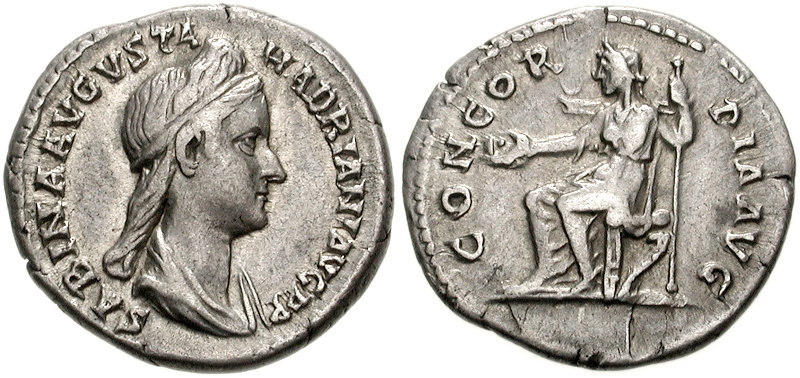
Denarius of Sabina, minted in Rome AD 128–134

Vibia Sabina died before her husband, some time in 136 or early 137. There is a strong ancient tradition that Hadrian treated his wife little better than a slave, and may have driven her to suicide. However other sources say he had great respect for her.

A relief commissioned by Hadrian "depicts the apotheosis, or divine ascent of Sabina in accordance with her posthumous deification on the order of Hadrian." Some 150 years later, this was reused as spolia on the so-called Arch of Portugal, and in modern times moved to the Capitoline Museums, where it is on display on the staircase of the Palazzo dei Conservatori.

== Temple ==
It has been suggested by researchers that temple L10 at Eleusis in Greece was dedicated to Sabina, who was labelled the 'New Demeter' by the Greeks. Another candidate for the temple may be empress Faustina, however. No conclusive evidence for either empress has been uncovered yet.

== See also ==
- Vibia Aurelia Sabina (170-died before 217), great-greatniece to Vibia Sabina

== Nerva–Antonine family tree ==
Nerva–Antonine family tree

Q. Marcius Barea Soranus | Q. Marcius Barea Sura | Antonia Furnilla | M. Cocceius Nerva | Sergia Plautilla | P. Aelius Hadrianus
Titus (r. 79–81) | Marcia Furnilla | Marcia | Trajanus Pater | Nerva (r. 96–98) | Ulpia (Note: Sister of Trajan's father: Giacosa (1977), p. 7.) | Aelius Hadrianus Marullinus
Flavia (Note: Giacosa (1977), p. 8.) | Marciana (Note: Levick (2014), p. 161.) | C. Salonius Matidius (Note: Husband of Ulpia Marciana: Levick (2014), p. 161.) | Trajan (r. 98–117) | Plotina | P. Acilius Attianus | P. Aelius Afer (Note: Giacosa (1977), p. 7.) | Paulina Major (Note: DIR contributor (Herbert W. Benario, 2000), "Hadrian".)
Lucius Mindius (2) | Libo Rupilius Frugi (3) | Salonia Matidia (Note: Giacosa (1977), p. 9.) | L. Vibius Sabinus (1) (Note: Husband of Salonia Matidia: Levick (2014), p. 161.)
Paulina Minor | L. Julius Ursus Servianus (Note: Smith (1870), "Julius Servianus".)
Matidia Minor | Sabina | Hadrian (Note: Smith (1870), "Hadrian", pp. 319–322.) (r. 117–138) | Antinous (Note: Lover of Hadrian: Lambert (1984), p. 99 and passim; deification: Lambert (1984), pp. 2–5, etc.)
C. Fuscus Salinator I | Julia Serviana Paulina
M. Annius Verus (Note: Husband of Rupilia Faustina: Levick (2014), p. 163.) | Rupilia Faustina (Note: Levick (2014), p. 163.) (Note: It is uncertain whether Rupilia Faustina was Frugi's daughter by Salonia Matidia or another woman.) | Boionia Procilla | Cn. Arrius Antoninus
L. Ceionius Commodus | Appia Severa | C. Fuscus Salinator II
L. Caesennius Paetus | Arria Antonina | Arria Fadilla (Note: Levick (2014), p. 162.) | T. Aurelius Fulvus
L. Caesennius Antoninus | L. Commodus | Plautia | unknown (Note: Levick (2014), p. 164.) | C. Avidius Nigrinus
M. Annius Verus | Calvisia Domitia Lucilla (Note: Wife of M. Annius Verus: Giacosa (1977), p. 10.) | Fundania (Note: Wife of M. Annius Libo: Levick (2014), p. 163.) | M. Annius Libo | Faustina | Antoninus Pius (r. 138–161) | L. Aelius Caesar | Avidia
Cornificia | Marcus Aurelius (r. 161–180) (Note: Giacosa (1977), p. 10.) | Faustina Minor | Aurelia Fadilla | Lucius Verus (r. 161–169) (1) | Ceionia Fabia | Plautius Quintillus (Note: Husband of Ceionia Fabia: Levick (2014), p. 164.) | Q. Servilius Pudens | Ceionia Plautia
Cornificia Minor (Note: Levick (2014), p. 117.) | M. Petronius Sura | Commodus (r. 177–192) | Fadilla | M. Annius Verus Caesar | Ti. Claudius Pompeianus (2) | Lucilla | M. Plautius Quintillus | Junius Licinius Balbus | Servilia Ceionia
Petronius Antoninus | L. Aurelius Agaclytus (2) | Aurelia Sabina | L. Antistius Burrus (1) | Plautius Quintillus | Plautia Servilla | C. Furius Sabinus Timesitheus | Maecia Faustina | Junius Licinius Balbus?
Furia Sabinia Tranquillina | Gordian III (r. 238–244)

- (1) = 1st spouse
- (2) = 2nd spouse
- (3) = 3rd spouse
- Reddish-purple indicates emperor of the Nerva–Antonine dynasty
  lighter purple indicates designated imperial heir of said dynasty who never reigned
  grey indicates unsuccessful imperial aspirants
  bluish-purple indicates emperors of other dynasties
- dashed lines indicate adoption; dotted lines indicate love affairs/unmarried relationships
- Small Caps = posthumously deified (Augusti, Augustae, or other)

Notes:

Except where otherwise noted, the notes below indicate that an individual's parentage is as shown in the above family tree.

References:
- DIR contributors (2000). "De Imperatoribus Romanis: An Online Encyclopedia of Roman Rulers and Their Families".
- Giacosa, Giorgio (1977). Women of the Caesars: Their Lives and Portraits on Coins. Translated by Holloway, R. Ross. Milan: Edizioni Arte e Moneta. ISBN 0-8390-0193-2.
- Lambert, Royston (1984). Beloved and God: The Story of Hadrian and Antinous. New York: Viking. ISBN 0-670-15708-2.
- Levick, Barbara (2014). Faustina I and II: Imperial Women of the Golden Age. Oxford University Press. ISBN 978-0-19-537941-9.
- Smith, William, ed. (1870). Dictionary of Greek and Roman Biography and Mythology.
