= Aurelian =

Roman emperor from 270 to 275

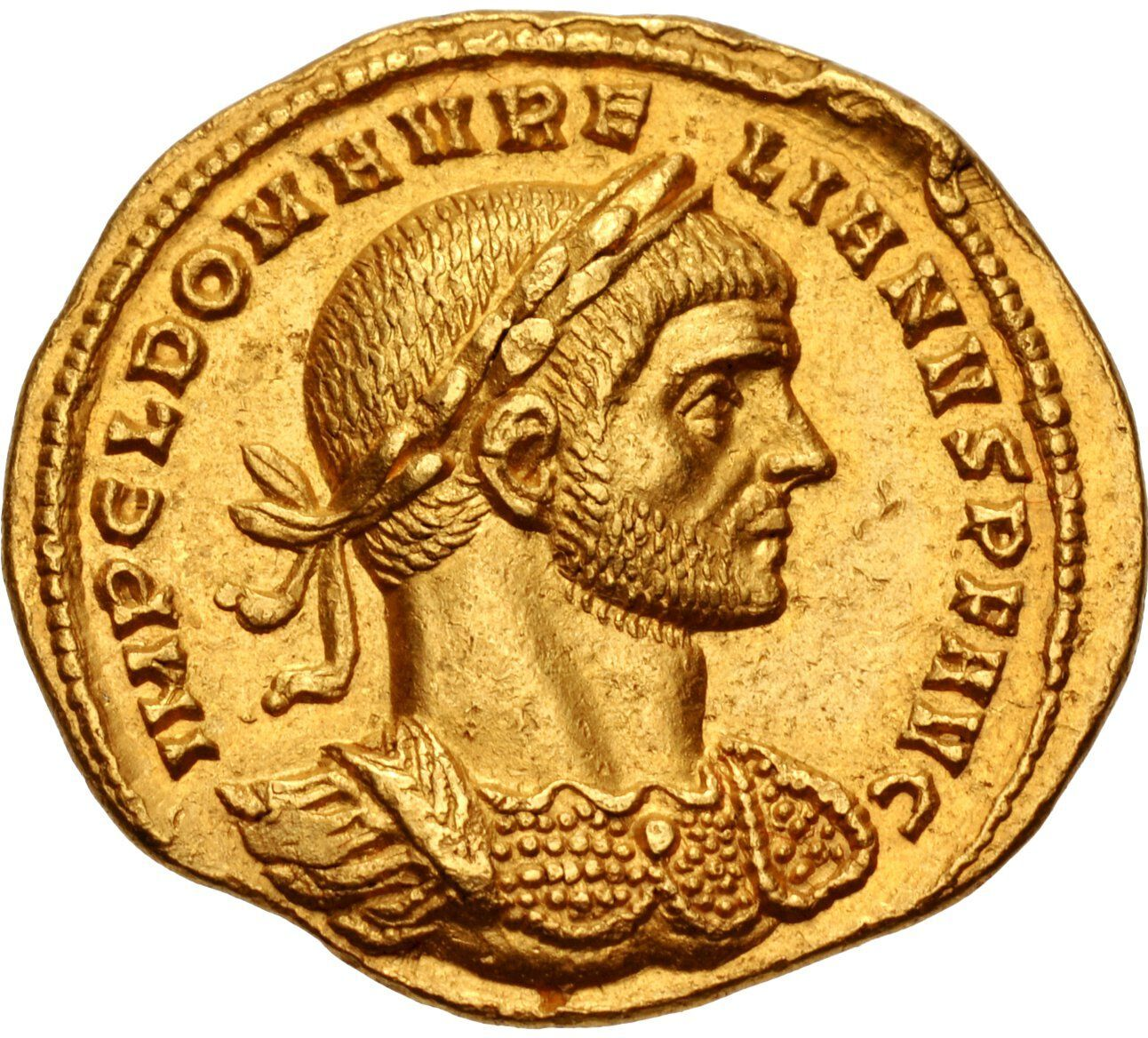
- Aureus of Aurelian minted in Mediolanum (modern Milan), Italy

Roman emperor
- Reign: 270–275
- Predecessor: Quintillus
- Successor: Tacitus
- Born: 9 September c. 214; Pannonia Inferior, Sirmium
- Died: c. November 275; Caenophrurium, Thracia
- Spouse: Ulpia Severina
- Issue: 1 daughter
Names
- Lucius Domitius Aurelianus (Note: His full name, with honorific and victory titles, was Imperator Caesar Lucius Domitius Aurelianus pius felix invictus Augustus, pontifex maximus, Germanicus maximus, Gothicus maximus, Parthicus maximus, Carpicus maximus, tribunicia potestate VI, consul III, imperator, pater patriae, proconsul, restitutor orbis.)
Regnal name
- Imperator Caesar Lucius Domitius Aurelianus Augustus
- Religion: Henotheist of Sol Invictus

Aurelian (/ɔːˈriːliən/; Latin: Lucius Domitius Aurelianus; 9 September c. 214 – c. November 275) was a Roman emperor from 270 to 275 during the Crisis of the Third Century. During his reign, he won an unprecedented series of military victories which reunited the Roman Empire after it had nearly disintegrated under the pressure of barbarian invasions and internal revolts. For his success in restoring the Empire's territorial integrity, Aurelian was honored with the title Restitutor Orbis ("Restorer of the World").

Born in modest circumstances, most likely in Moesia Superior, he entered the Roman army in 235 and climbed up the ranks. He went on to lead the cavalry of the emperor Gallienus, until Gallienus' assassination in 268. Following that, Claudius Gothicus became emperor until his own death in 270. Claudius' brother Quintillus then ruled for three months, before Aurelian took the empire for himself.

Aurelian was chosen Roman emperor by the Illyriciani as one of themselves. During his reign, he defeated the Alamanni after a devastating war. He also defeated the Goths, Vandals, Juthungi, Sarmatians, and Carpi. Aurelian restored the Empire's eastern provinces after his conquest of the Palmyrene Empire in 273. The following year he conquered the Gallic Empire in the west, reuniting the Empire in its entirety. He was also responsible for the construction of the Aurelian Walls in Rome, the abandonment of the province of Dacia, and monetary reforms attempting to curb the devaluation of the Roman currency.

Although Domitian, two centuries earlier, was the first emperor who had demanded to be officially hailed as dominus et deus ('master and god'), these titles never occurred in written form on official documents until the reign of Aurelian. His successes were instrumental in ending the crisis.

== Early life ==
Many details about Aurelian's early life come from the Historia Augusta and are considered unreliable. Comparative research with other sources from his era has rendered some details more secure than others. Aurelian was born on 9 September, a date recorded in the Chronograph of 354. The 6th-century chronicler John Malalas wrote that he died at the age of 61, implying a birth in 214. However, Malalas' chronicle is often described as "frequently unreliable", and so any date thence inferred must—absent corroborating evidence from more credible sources—remain tentative.

The Historia Augusta describes him both as a Pannonian from Sirmium and as a native of Dacia Ripensis "which he founded so that he would have been a Moesian". Pseudo-Victor and John Xiphilinus place his birthplace in an area between Dacia Ripensis and Macedonia (overlapping with Dacia Mediterranea). Modern research considers Dacia Ripensis as the more likely region. When he was born this region was part of Moesia Superior. Aurelian was an Illyrian like several other emperors of the late 3rd century (Illyrian emperors) all of whom shared a common military background. Pseudo-Victor describes his father as a colonus (tenant farmer) who worked the lands of a senator named Aurelius. Aurelian's father was probably a veteran of the Roman army. He married the daughter of Aurelius from whom Aurelian received his name via his mother. The Historia Augusta describes her as "priestess of Sol", whose worship Aurelian promoted as Emperor (Sol Invictus). These two propositions, together with the tradition that the clan Aurelius had been entrusted with the maintenance of that deity's cult in Rome, inspired the notion that this could explain the devotion to the sun-god that Aurelian was to manifest as emperor. However, it seems that this extrapolation of unverifiable facts is now generally accepted as being no more than just that.

== Military service ==
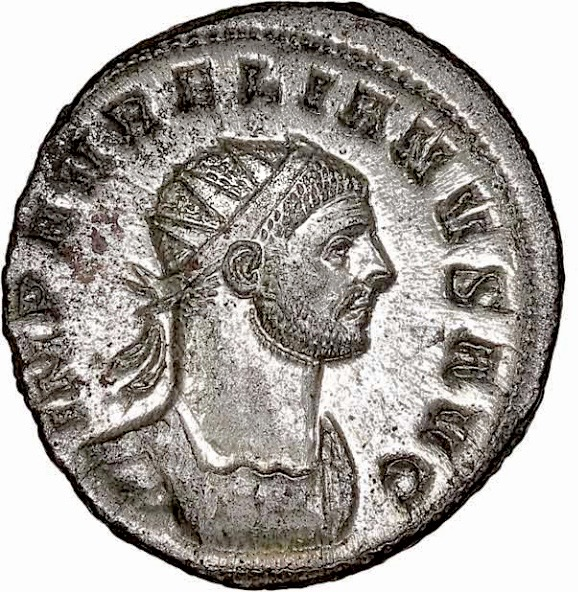
Antoninianus of Aurelian minted in Serdica (Bulgaria), AD 274.

It is commonly accepted that Aurelian likely joined the army in 235, when he was around the age of twenty. It is also generally assumed that, as a member of the lowest rank of society – albeit a citizen (Note: Had Aurelian's family been enfranchised by virtue of the Constitutio Antoniniana (212) his nomen would have been "Aurelius".) – he would have enlisted in the ranks of the legions. Saunders suggests that his career is more easily understood if it is assumed that his family was of Roman settler origins with a tradition of military service and that he enlisted as an equestrian. This would have opened up for him the tres militia – the three steps of the equestrian military career – one of the routes to higher equestrian office in the Imperial Service. (Note: The tres militia were: (i) prefecture of a cohort of auxiliary infantry; (ii) tribunate of a legionary cohort; and (iii) prefecture of an ala of auxiliary cavalry.) This could be a more expeditious route to senior military and procuratorial offices than that pursued by ex-rankers, although not necessarily less laborious. (Note: Compare the career of Pertinax who pursued the Tres Militia with those of Publius Aelius Aelianus, Lucius Aurelius Marcianus (both probably) and Traianus Mucianus (certainly) who rose e caliga, i.e. through the ranks.) Although Saunders's conjecture as to Aurelian's early career is not supported by any evidence other than his nomen which could indicate Italian settler ancestry — and even this is contested — his rise to the highest ranks is more easily understood if he did not have to start from the bottom. His suggestion has not been taken up by other academic authorities.

Whatever his origins, Aurelian certainly must have built up a very solid reputation for military competence during the tumultuous mid-decades of the century. To be sure, the exploits detailed in the Historia Augusta vita Divi Aureliani, while not always impossible, are not supported by any independent evidence and one at least is demonstrably an invention typical of that author. However, he was probably associated with Gallienus's cavalry army and shone as an officer of that elite unit because, when he finally emerged in a historically reliable context in the early part of the reign of Claudius II, he seems to have been its commander.

=== Ulpius Crinitus ===
The existence of Ulpius Crinitus has been doubted by many historians. If he did exist he would have been a dux of the Illyrian and Thracian legions. Ulpius was reportedly born in the city of Italica, in modern Spain. He took an interest in Aurelian's early career. Aurelian was reportedly his deputy for a time. When a group of Goths invaded Illyria and Thrace, Ulpius had fallen ill, so he ordered Aurelian to deal with the invaders. Aurelian was designated as legate of the Third Legion. He used his force of 2,500 auxiliaries, and the armies of four Germanic chieftains to defeat the Goths in battle. Aurelian used the resources gained from the battles to enrich the provinces. After the battle, Crinitus thanked Valerian, the emperor at the time, for providing him with such a talented deputy. Crinitus adopted Aurelian as his heir, either voluntarily or possibly through force. Emperor Valerian attended the adoption ceremony which took place in the baths of Byzantium. Following this, Crinitus disappeared from the historical record. The Historia Augusta claims that Crinitus was portrayed, along with Aurelian, in the walls of the Temple of Sol, ordered built by Aurelian after his successful Palmyrene campaign. However, no traces of this building remain.

=== Under Gallienus ===
Aurelian's successes as a cavalry commander ultimately made him a member of Emperor Gallienus' entourage. In 268 Gallienus travelled to Italy and fought Aureolus, his former general and now usurper for the throne. Driving Aureolus back into Mediolanum, Gallienus promptly besieged his adversary in the city. During the siege, the Emperor was assassinated. One source says Aurelian, who was present at the siege, participated and supported general Claudius for the purple — which is plausible. In 268 or 269 Aurelian and his cavalry participated in the victory of Emperor Gallienus (or Emperor Claudius II Gothicus) over the Goths at the Battle of Naissus.

Aurelian was married to Ulpia Severina, about whom little is known. She was from Dacia. They are known to have had a daughter together.

=== Under Claudius ===
Claudius was proclaimed emperor by the soldiers outside Mediolanum. The new emperor immediately ordered the Senate to deify Gallienus. Next, Claudius began to distance himself from those responsible for his predecessor's assassination, ordering the execution of those directly involved. Aureolus was still besieged in Mediolanum and sought reconciliation with the new emperor, but Claudius had no sympathy for a potential rival. The emperor had Aureolus killed and one source implicates Aurelian in the deed, perhaps even signing the warrant for his death himself.

During the reign of Claudius, Aurelian was promoted rapidly: he was given command of the elite Dalmatian cavalry and soon promoted to overall head of the army after the emperor and what had been Emperor Claudius' own position before his acclamation. The war against Aureolus and the concentration of forces in Italy allowed the Alamanni to break through the Rhaetian limes along the upper Danube. Marching through Raetia and the Alps unhindered, they entered northern Italy and began pillaging the area. In early 269, emperor Claudius and Aurelian marched north to meet the Alamanni, defeating them at the Battle of Lake Benacus.

While still dealing with the defeated enemy, news came from the Balkans reporting large-scale attacks from the Heruli, Goths, Gepids, and Bastarnae. Claudius immediately dispatched Aurelian to the Balkans to contain the invasion as best he could until Claudius could arrive with his main army. The Goths were besieging Thessalonica when they heard of emperor Claudius' approach, causing them to abandon the siege and pillage north-eastern Macedonia. Aurelian intercepted the Goths with his Dalmatian cavalry and defeated them in a series of minor skirmishes, killing as many as three thousand of the enemy. Aurelian continued to harass the enemy, driving them northward into Upper Moesia where emperor Claudius had assembled his main army. The ensuing battle was indecisive: the northward advance of the Goths was halted but Roman losses were heavy.

Claudius could not afford another pitched battle, so he instead laid a successful ambush, killing thousands. However, the majority of the Goths escaped and began retreating south the way they had come. For the rest of year, Aurelian harassed the enemy with his Dalmatian cavalry.

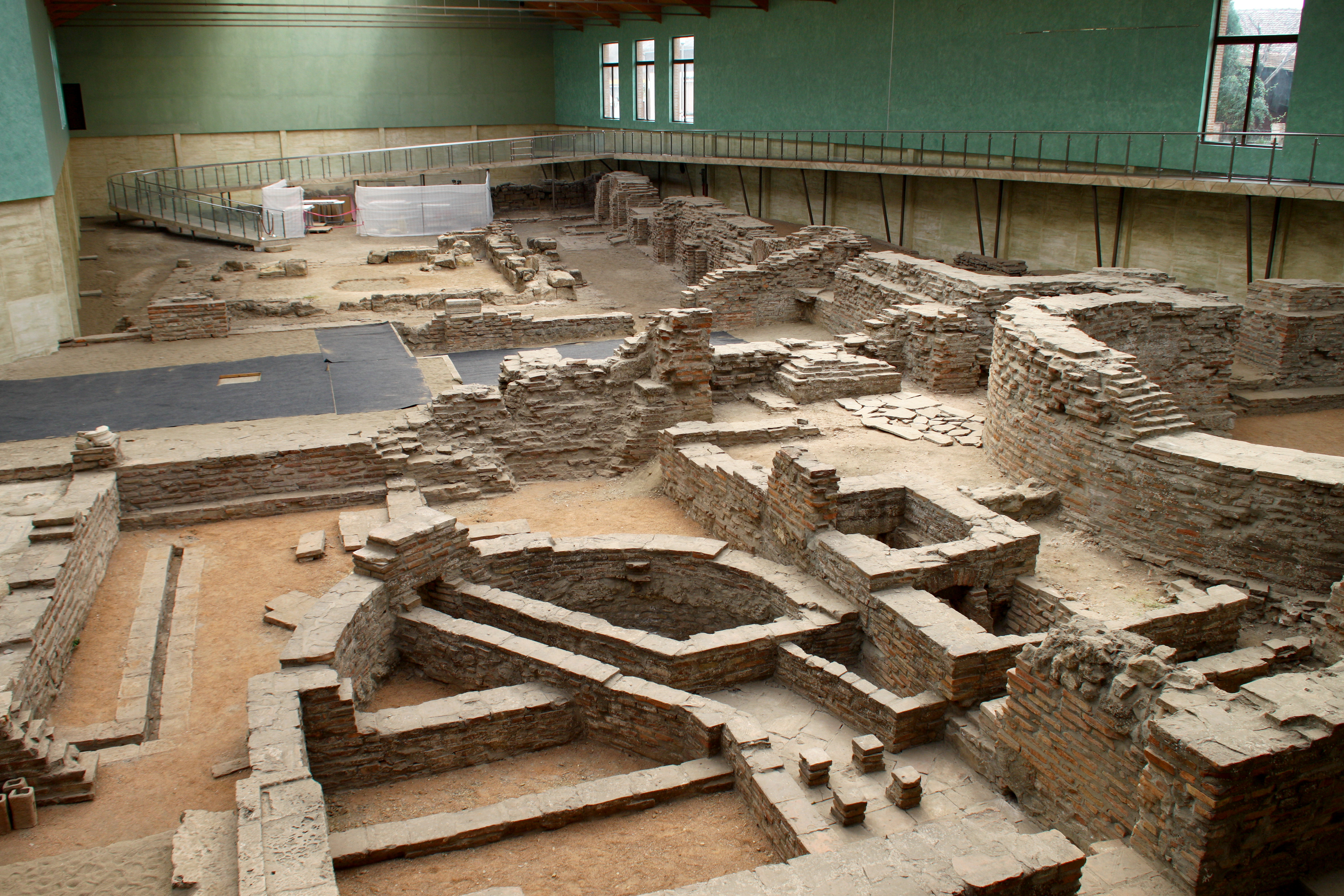
Ruins of Imperial Palace at Sirmium, today in Sremska Mitrovica

Now stranded in Roman territory, the Goths' lack of provisions began to take its toll. Aurelian, sensing his enemies' desperation, attacked them with the full force of his cavalry, killing many and driving the remainder westward into Thrace. As winter set in, the Goths retreated into the Haemus Mountains, only to find themselves trapped and surrounded. The harsh conditions now exacerbated their shortage of food. However, the Romans underestimated the Goths and let their guard down, allowing the enemy to break through their lines and escape. Apparently emperor Claudius ignored advice, perhaps from Aurelian, and withheld the cavalry and sent in only the infantry to stop their break-out.

The determined Goths killed many of the oncoming infantry and were only prevented from slaughtering them all when Aurelian finally charged in with his Dalmatian cavalry. The Goths still managed to escape and continued their march through Thrace. The Roman army continued to follow the Goths during the spring and summer of 270. Meanwhile, a devastating plague swept through the Balkans, killing many soldiers in both armies.

Emperor Claudius fell ill on the march to the battle and returned to his regional headquarters in Sirmium, leaving Aurelian in charge of operations against the Goths. Aurelian used his cavalry to great effect, breaking the Goths into smaller groups which were easier to handle. By late summer the Goths were defeated: any survivors were stripped of their animals and booty and were levied into the army or settled as farmers in frontier regions. Aurelian had no time to relish his victories; in late August news arrived from Sirmium that emperor Claudius was dead.

== Emperor ==
=== Rise to power ===
When Claudius died, his brother Quintillus seized power with support of the Senate. With an act typical of the Crisis of the Third Century, the army refused to recognize the new emperor, preferring to support one of its own commanders: Aurelian was proclaimed emperor about August or September (older sources argue for May) by the legions in Sirmium. Aurelian defeated Quintillus' troops, and was recognized as emperor by the Senate after Quintillus' death. The claim that Aurelian was chosen by Claudius on his death bed can be dismissed as propaganda; later, probably in 272, Aurelian put his own dies imperii at the day of Claudius' death, thus implicitly considering Quintillus a usurper.

=== The Roman Empire in the 270s ===
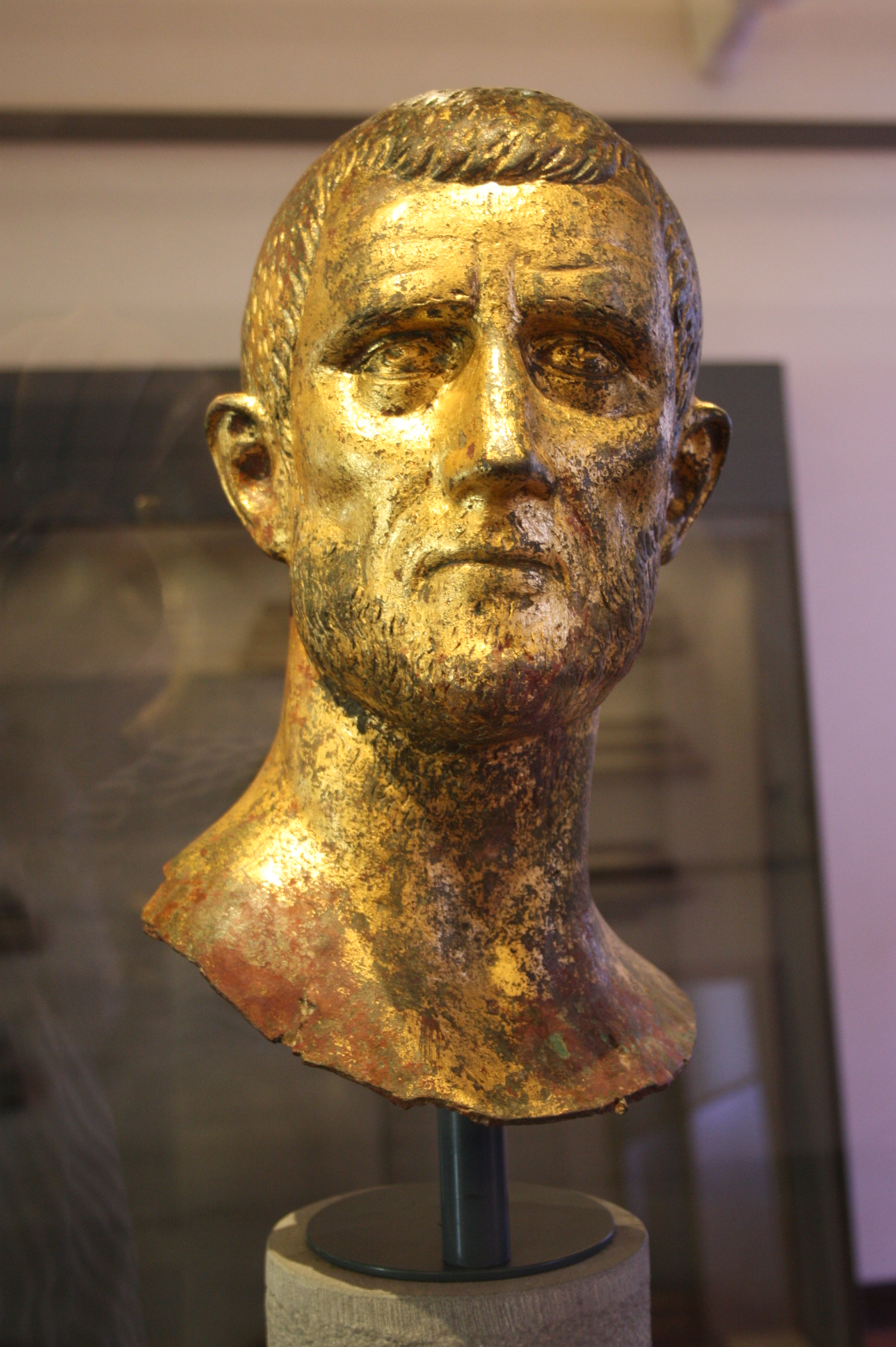
Bronze bust labelled as Claudius Gothicus in the Santa Giulia Museum of Brescia (Italy). This bust has sometimes been identified as Aurelian. (Note: The collection of Brescia includes four bronze busts that have been traditionally identified as two pairs belonging to Probus and Claudius II. This bust (MR. 352) is sometimes identified as Aurelian. The other supposed bust of Claudius (MR. 353) has also been identified as Probus. The busts may all depict different people, however. It is virtually impossible to confirm their identity, as coin portraits after the 3rd century gradually lost individual features and often varied depending on the mint.)

In 248, Emperor Philip the Arab had celebrated the millennium of the city of Rome with great and expensive ceremonies and games, and the Empire had given a tremendous proof of self-confidence. In the following years, the Empire had to face a huge pressure from external enemies, while, at the same time, dangerous civil wars threatened the empire from within, with usurpers weakening the strength of the state. Also, the economic substrate of the state, agriculture and commerce, suffered from the disruption caused by the instability. On top of this, an epidemic swept through the Empire around 250, greatly diminishing manpower both for the army and for agriculture.

The end result was that the Empire could not endure the blow of the capture of Emperor Valerian in 260 by the Sassanids. The eastern provinces found their protectors in the rulers of the city of Palmyra, in Syria, whose autonomy grew until the formation of the Palmyrene Empire, which was successful in defending against the Sassanid threat. The western provinces, those facing the limes of the Rhine, seceded to form a third, autonomous state within the territories of the Roman Empire, which is now known as the Gallic Empire.

In Rome, the Emperor was occupied with internal menaces to his power and with the defence of Italia and the Balkans.

=== Reunification of the empire ===
The first actions of the new Emperor were aimed at strengthening his own position in his territories. Late in 270, Aurelian campaigned in northern Italia against the Vandals, Juthungi, and Sarmatians, expelling them from Roman territory. To celebrate these victories, Aurelian was granted the title of Germanicus Maximus. The authority of the Emperor was challenged by several usurpers—Septimius, Urbanus, Domitianus, and the rebellion of Felicissimus—who tried to exploit the sense of insecurity of the empire and the overwhelming influence of the armies in Roman politics. Aurelian, being an experienced commander, was aware of the importance of the army, and his propaganda, known through his coinage, shows he wanted the support of the legions.

==== Defending Italy against the Juthungi ====
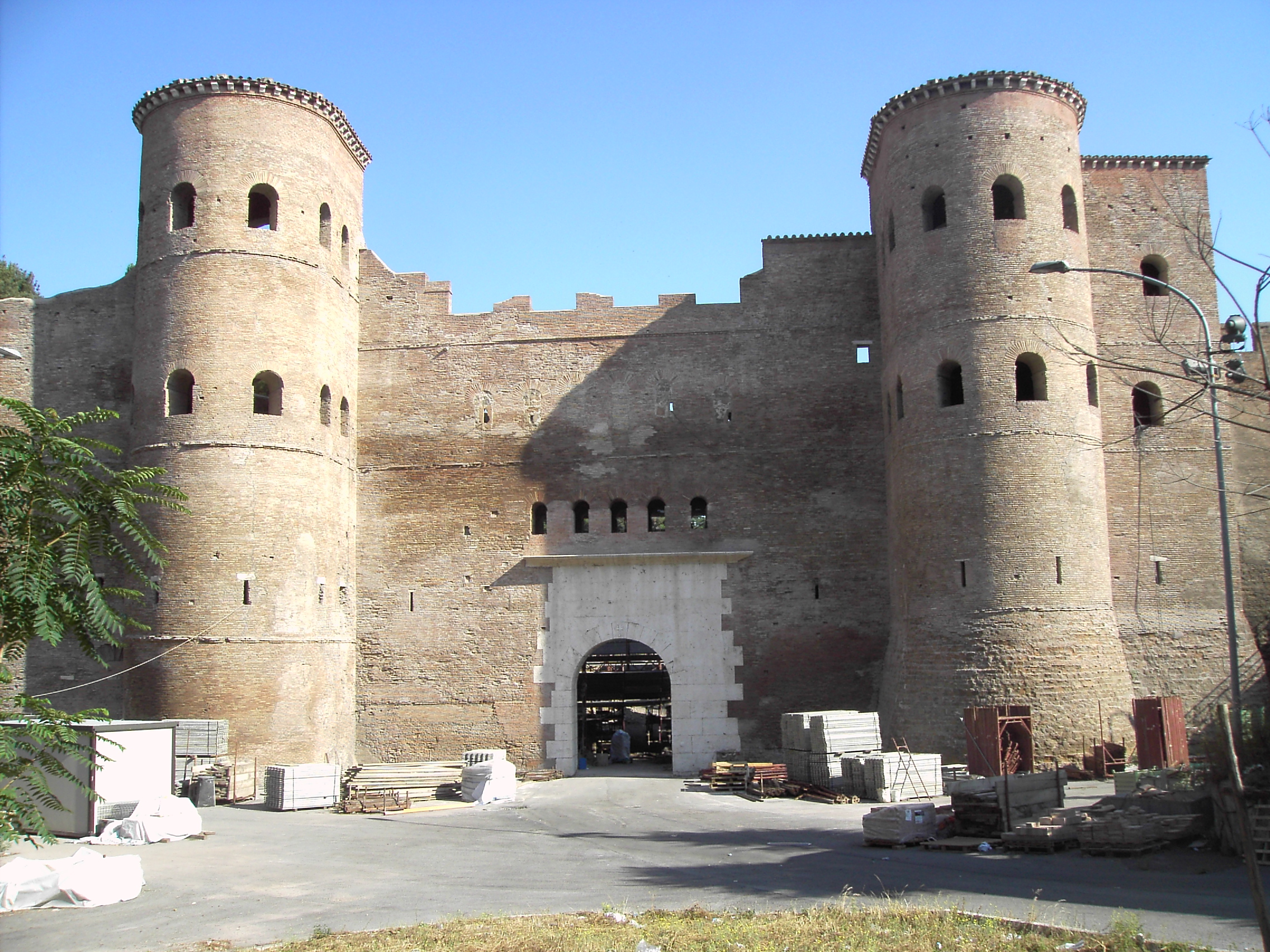
The Porta Asinaria, a gate in the Aurelian Walls

The burden of the northern barbarians was not yet over, however. In 271, the Alamanni moved towards Italia, entering the Po plain and sacking the villages; they passed the Po River, occupied Placentia and moved towards Fano. Aurelian, who was in Pannonia to control the Vandals' withdrawal, quickly entered Italia, but his army was defeated in an ambush near Placentia (January 271). When the news of the defeat arrived in Rome, it caused great fear for the arrival of the barbarians, but Aurelian attacked the Alamanni camping near the Metaurus River, defeating them in the Battle of Fano, and forcing them to re-cross the Po river; Aurelian finally routed them at Pavia. For this, he received the title Germanicus Maximus. However, the menace of the Germanic people and a Germanic invasion was still perceived by the Romans as likely; therefore Aurelian resolved to build a new system of walls around Rome that became known as the Aurelian Walls.

==== Defeat of the Goths and abandonment of Dacia ====
The emperor led his legions to the Balkans, where he defeated and routed the Goths beyond the Danube, killing the Gothic leader Cannabaudes, possibly to be identified with Cniva, and assuming the title of Gothicus Maximus. However, he decided to abandon the province of Dacia, on the exposed north bank of the Danube, as it was too difficult and expensive to defend. He reorganized a new province of Dacia south of the Danube, inside the former Moesia, called Dacia Aureliana, with Serdica as the capital.

==== Conquest of the Palmyrene Empire ====
The Roman Empire by 271 A.D before the reconquest of the Palmyrene Empire and the Gallic Empire by Aurelian

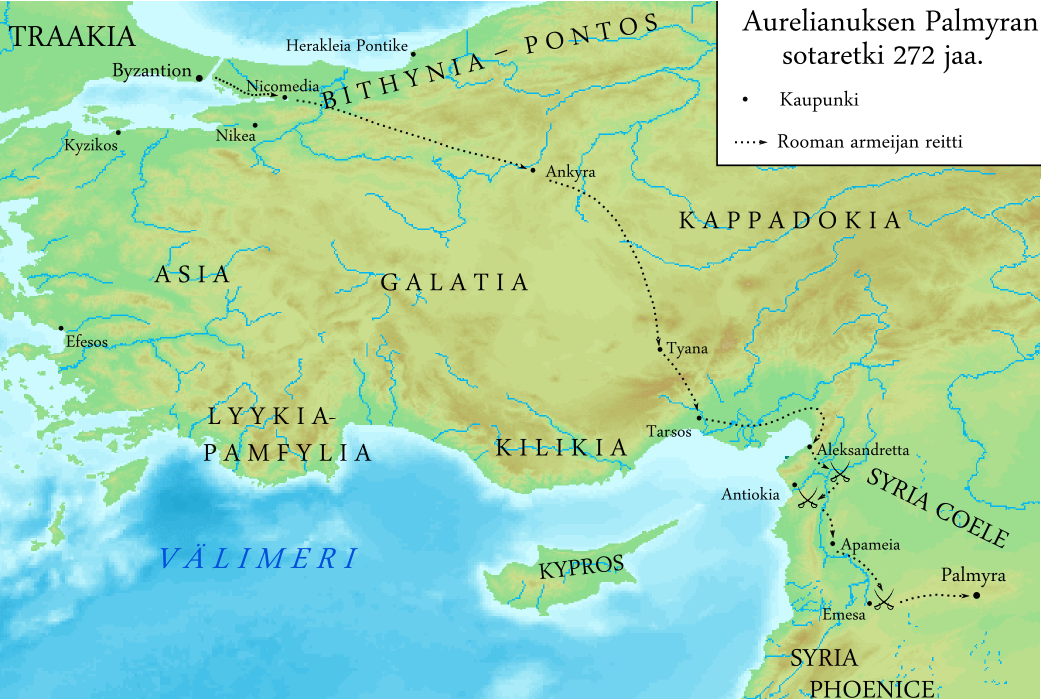
The route of Aurelian's campaign against Palmyra.

In 272, Aurelian turned his attention to the lost eastern provinces of the empire, the Palmyrene Empire, ruled by Queen Zenobia from the city of Palmyra. Zenobia had carved out her own empire, encompassing Syria, Palestine, Egypt and large parts of Asia Minor. The Syrian queen cut off Rome's shipments of grain, and in a matter of weeks, the Romans started running low on bread. In the beginning, Aurelian had been recognized as Emperor, while Vaballathus, the son of Zenobia, held the title of rex and imperator ("king" and "supreme military commander"), but Aurelian decided to invade the eastern provinces as soon as he felt his army was strong enough for the campaign.

Asia Minor was recovered easily; every city but Byzantium and Tyana surrendered to him with little resistance. The fall of Tyana lent itself to a legend: Aurelian to that point had destroyed every city that resisted him, but he spared Tyana after having a vision of the great 1st-century philosopher Apollonius of Tyana, whom he respected greatly, in a dream. Apollonius implored: "Aurelian, if you desire to rule, abstain from the blood of the innocent! Aurelian, if you will conquer, be merciful!" Aurelian spared Tyana, and it paid off; many more cities submitted to him upon seeing that the Emperor would not exact revenge upon them. Within six months, his armies stood at the gates of Palmyra, which surrendered when Zenobia tried to flee to the Sassanid Empire.

Eventually Zenobia and her son were captured and made to walk the streets of Rome in his triumph, the woman in golden chains. With the grain stores of Rome refilled, Aurelian's soldiers handed out free bread to the citizens of the city, and the Emperor was hailed a hero by his subjects. After a brief clash with the Persians and another in Egypt against the usurper Firmus, Aurelian was obliged to return to Palmyra in 273 when that city rebelled once more. This time, Aurelian allowed his soldiers to sack the city, and Palmyra never recovered. More honors came his way; he was now known as Parthicus Maximus and Restitutor Orientis ("Restorer of the East").

He took up the title Restitutor Orbis ("Restorer of the World"). This title was first assumed by Aurelian in late summer of 272, and had been carried previously by both Valerian and Gallienus. (Note: This title had also been attested in the epigraphs of Gordian III and Philip.) The increased frequency of its usage was Aurelian's innovation.

The rich province of Egypt was also recovered by Aurelian. The Brucheion (Royal Quarter) in Alexandria was burned to the ground. This section of the city once contained the Library of Alexandria, although the extent of the surviving Library in Aurelian's time is uncertain.

==== Conquest of the Gallic Empire ====
After Aurelian had succeeded in his reconquest of the Palmyrene Empire, he turned his attention to the Gallic Empire, beginning preparations for an invasion in 273. In early 274, Aurelian began to march into northern Gaul, while the leader of the Gallic Empire, Tetricus I, led his troops southward from Augusta Treverorum to meet him. The armies of Aurelian and Tetricus met in February or March 274 at the Battle of Châlons, near modern-day Châlons in north-eastern France. Roman sources, including Aurelius Victor, Eutropius, the Historia Augusta, and Orosius report that Tetricus had already made a deal with Aurelian, offering to betray his troops and surrender in exchange for an honourable defeat and no punishment, allegedly quoting the ghost of Palinurus from Virgil's Aeneid 6.365: eripe me his, invicte, malis ('pluck me out, O undefeated one, from these troubles'). However, some modern historians have questioned this narrative and suggested that it may have been the product of Roman imperial propaganda. According to Alaric Watson, the higher discipline of the Roman forces, coupled with the greater military command of Aurelian, tipped the harsh battle in Roman favor, and after Tetricus was captured in during the battle, the morale of the Gallic forces broke.

Tetricus surrendered either directly after his defeat or later; the latest possible date for his surrender was March 274, when the Gallic mints switched from minting coins of Tetricus I and II to those of Aurelian.

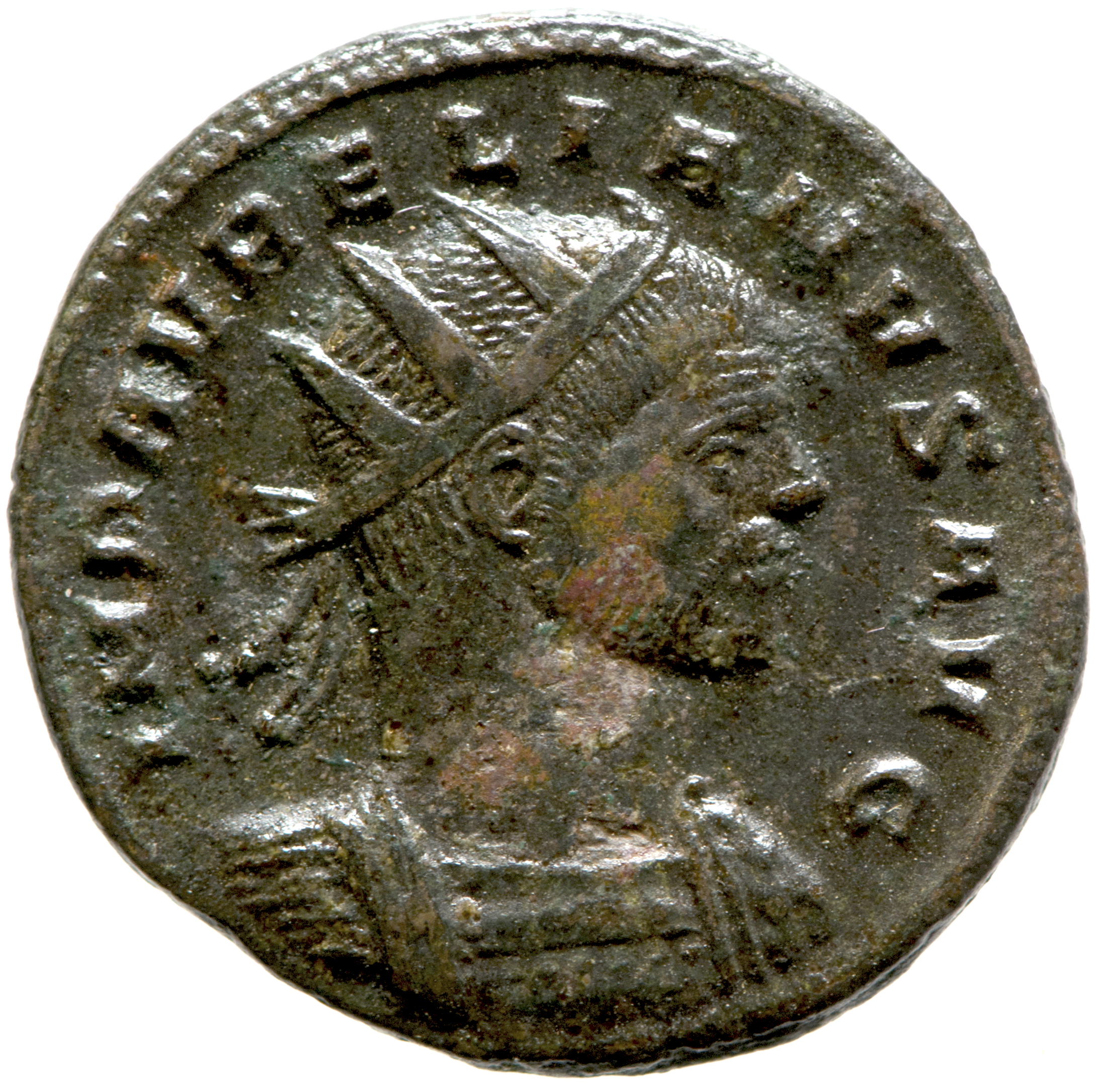
A Radiate of Aurelian, obverse. Legend: IMP. AVRELIANVS AVG.

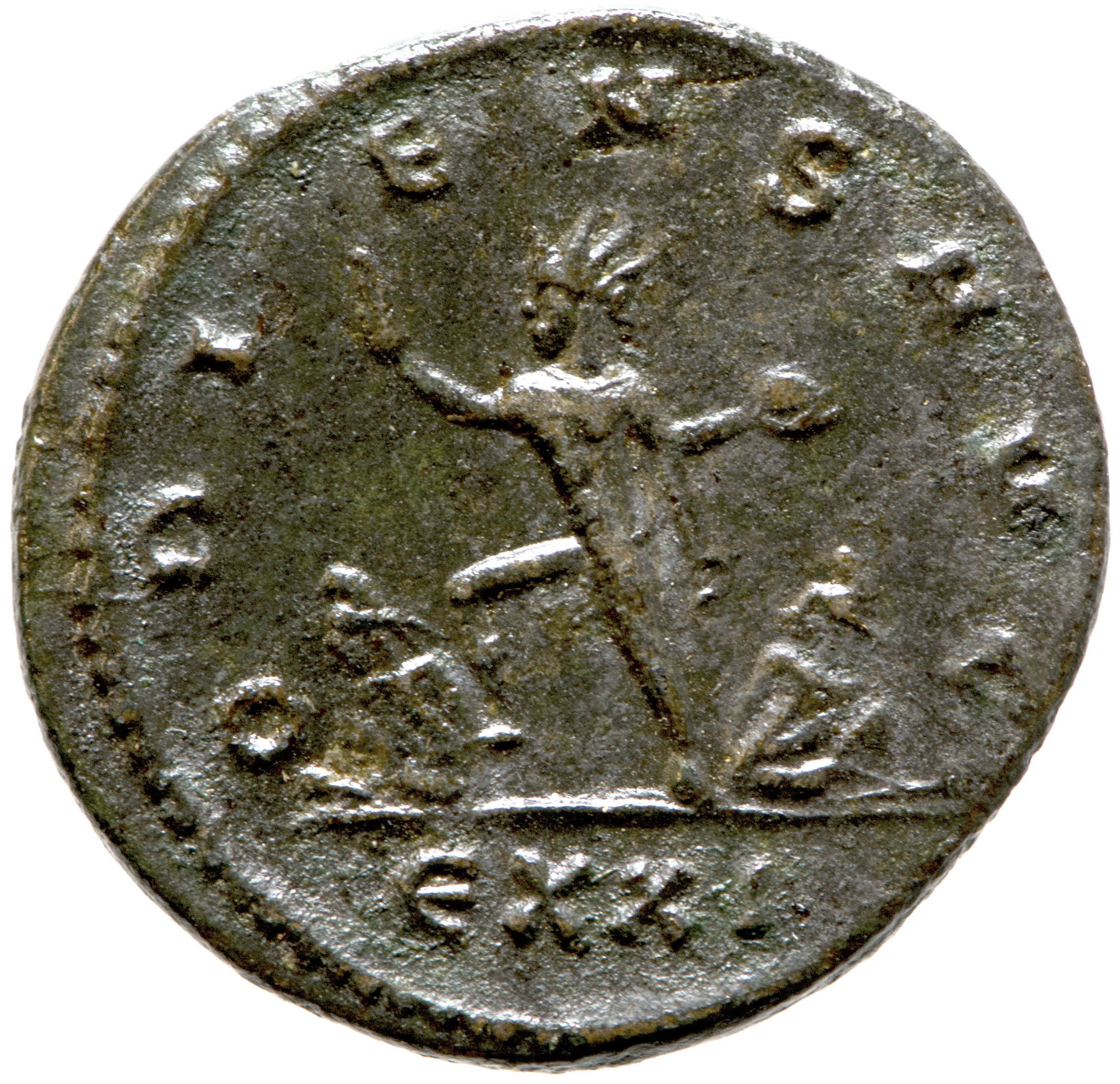
A Radiate of Aurelian, reverse. Legend: ORIENS AVG. – EXXI.

=== Reforms ===
Aurelian was a reformer, and settled many important functions of the imperial apparatus, dealing with the economy and religion. He restored many public buildings, reorganized the management of the food reserves, set fixed prices for the most important goods, and prosecuted misconduct by the public officers.

==== Religious reform ====
Aurelian strengthened the position of the Sun god Sol Invictus as the main divinity of the Roman pantheon. His intention was to give to all the peoples of the Empire, civilian or soldiers, easterners or westerners, a single god they could believe in without betraying their own gods. The centre of the cult was a new temple, built in 274 and dedicated on 25 December of that year in the Campus Agrippae in Rome, with great decorations financed by the spoils of the Palmyrene Empire.

During his short rule, Aurelian seemed to follow the principle of "one faith, one empire", which would not be made official until the Edict of Thessalonica. He appears with the title deus et dominus natus ("God and born ruler") on some of his coins, a style also later adopted by Diocletian. Lactantius argued that Aurelian would have outlawed all the other gods if he had had enough time. He was recorded by Christian historians as having organized persecutions.

==== Felicissimus' rebellion and coinage reform ====
Aurelian's reign records the only uprising of mint workers. The rationalis Felicissimus, a senior public financial official whose responsibilities included supervision of the mint at Rome, revolted against Aurelian. The revolt seems to have been caused by the fact that the mint workers, and Felicissimus first, were accustomed to stealing the silver meant for the coins and producing coins of inferior quality. Aurelian wanted to eliminate this, and put Felicissimus on trial. The rationalis incited the mint workers to revolt: the rebellion spread in the streets, even if it seems that Felicissimus was killed immediately, presumably executed.

The Palmyrene rebellion in Egypt had probably reduced the grain supply to Rome, thus disaffecting the population to the emperor. This rebellion also had the support of some senators, probably those who had supported the election of Quintillus, and thus had something to fear from Aurelian.

Aurelian ordered the cohortes urbanae ("urban cohorts"), reinforced by some regular troops of the imperial army, to attack the rebelling mob: the resulting battle, fought on the Caelian Hill, marked the end of the revolt, even if at a high price (some sources give the figure, probably exaggerated, of 7,000 casualties). Many of the rebels were executed; also some of the supporting senators were put to death. The mint of Rome was closed temporarily, and the institution of several other mints caused the main mint of the empire to lose its hegemony.

His monetary reformation included the introduction of antoniniani containing 5% silver. They bore the mark XXI (or its Greek numeral form KA), which meant - according to some researchers - that twenty of such coins would contain the same silver quantity of an old silver denarius. (Note: Later emperors Tacitus and Carus would mint coins with the legends XI or IA, signalling a 10% of silver in the alloy.) Considering that this was an improvement over the previous situation gives an idea of the severity of the economic situation Aurelian faced. The Emperor struggled to introduce the new "good" coin by recalling all the old "bad" coins before their introduction.

A very large number of rare gold coins of Aurelian have been discovered as part of the Lava Treasure in Corsica, France, in the 1980s.

==== Food distribution reforms ====
Rome had been distributing grain to its poorest citizens at a reduced price since 123 BC, and for free since 58 BC through the Cura Annonae. Aurelian is usually credited with changing or completing the change of the food distribution system from grain or flour to bread, and adding olive oil, salt, and pork to the products distributed to the populace. These products had been distributed sporadically before. Aurelian is also credited with increasing the size of the loaves of bread without increasing their price – a measure that was undoubtedly popular with the Romans who were not receiving free bread and other products through the dole.

Aurelian is believed to have terminated Trajan's alimenta program. Roman prefect Titus Flavius Postumius Quietus was the last known official in charge of the alimenta, in 271. If Aurelian "did suppress this food distribution system, he most likely intended to put into effect a more radical reform." Indeed, around this time, Aurelian reformed the Cura Annonae to replace the dole of grain by a dole of bread, salt and pork, as well as subsidized prices for other goods such as oil and wine.

== Death ==
The deaths of the Sassanid Kings Shapur I (272) and Hormizd I (273) in quick succession, and the rise to power of a weakened ruler (Bahram I), presented an opportunity to attack the Sassanid Empire, and in 275 Aurelian set out for another campaign against the Sassanids. On his way, he suppressed a revolt in Gaul – possibly against Faustinus, an officer or usurper of Tetricus – and defeated barbarian marauders in Vindelicia (Germany).

However, Aurelian never reached Persia, as he was murdered while waiting in Thrace to cross into Asia Minor. As an administrator, he had been strict and had handed out severe punishments to corrupt officials or soldiers. A secretary of his (called Eros by Zosimus) had told a lie on a minor issue. In fear of what the emperor might do, he forged a document listing the names of high officials marked by the emperor for execution and showed it to collaborators. The notarius Mucapor and other high-ranking officers of the Praetorian Guard, fearing punishment from the emperor, murdered him shortly after October 275 (Tacitus began his reign in November or December), in Caenophrurium, Thrace.

Aurelian's enemies in the Senate briefly succeeded in passing damnatio memoriae on the emperor, but this was reversed before the end of the year, and Aurelian, like his predecessor Claudius II, was deified as Divus Aurelianus.

There is some evidence that Aurelian's wife, Ulpia Severina, who had been declared Augusta in 274, ruled the empire in her own right for some time after his death, although this is just speculative. Sources hint at an interregnum between Aurelian's death and the election of Marcus Claudius Tacitus as his successor. Additionally, some of Ulpia's coins appear to have been minted after Aurelian's death.

== Legacy ==
The city of Orléans in France is named after Aurelian. Originally named Cenabum, Aurelian rebuilt and renamed it Aurelianum or Aureliana Civitas ("city of Aurelian", cité d'Aurélien), which evolved into Orléans.

== Notes ==
Regnal titles
Preceded by Quintillus	Roman emperor 270–275	Succeeded by Tacitus
Political offices
Preceded by Flavius Antiochianus; Virius Orfitus	Roman consul 271 with Pomponius Bassus	Succeeded by T. Flavius Postumius Quietus; Junius Veldumnianus
Preceded by M. Claudius Tacitus; Julius Placidianus	Roman consul 274–275 with Capitolinus (274); Marcellinus (275)	Succeeded by M. Claudius Tacitus II; Aemilianus II
