= Vipsania Polla =

Ancient Roman woman

- Occupation: Supervisor
- Known for: Sister of Agrippa, Porticus Vipsania
- Father: Lucius Vipsanius

Vipsania Polla was an ancient Roman woman of the late Republic, the sister of emperor Augustus' close friend and lieutenant, Marcus Vipsanius Agrippa. She is best known today for the construction of the Porticus Vipsania.

== History ==
=== Early life ===
Polla was born in the Late Roman Republic to a plebeian family, likely from Venetia or Histria. Her father was Lucius Vipsanius Major and her mother an unknown woman. She had two brothers, Marcus Vipsanius Agrippa and Lucius Vipsanius Minor. Since Cassius Dio records her name as Polla and not Vipsania it is possible that she used Polla as her praenomen. She is also the only notable woman of her gens not to have a cognomen derived from her brother's name.

=== Career ===
Although Polla was a distinguished woman, little information about her has survived. She is remembered chiefly for overseeing construction of a monument called the Porticus Vipsania, a map of the Roman Empire engraved in marble. Marcus Agrippa started the construction of this map before his death in 12 BC, and Polla took over the project using the notes that he left behind. It is likely that she also organized races in memory of her brother, since he was a circus enthusiast.

=== Later life ===
Sabina Tariverdieva has proposed that she was the woman married to Quintus Haterius instead of her niece.

A freedman of Livia named Apa Pollianus attested from inscription has been speculated (based on onomastic conventions) to have been a slave of Polla before coming into the empress's ownership. This theory was put forth by Otto Hirschfeld.

Polla likely died some time around 7 BC. This was before the completion of the porticus, and it was finished by Augustus.

== Cultural depictions ==
There have been attempts made to identify some women on the Ara Pacis as Polla. Alfred von Domaszewski believed that she was the woman who touches the head of the boy next to Agrippa. Ronald Syme strongly disagreed with this idea.

== See also ==
- Women in ancient Rome
- List of Roman women

== Sources ==
- https://www.livius.org/vi-vr/vipsanius/agrippa.html
