= Porticus Vipsania =

Ancient Roman map of the world

- portico of Vipsania porticus Pollae porticus Europae
- Location within Italy
- Type: portico
- Location: Italy
- Region: Metropolitan City of Rome Capital, Lazio

The Porticus Vipsania (Latin for the "Vipsanian Portico"), also known as the Portico of Agrippa (Porticus Agrippae), was a portico near the Via Flaminia in the Campus Agrippae of ancient Rome, famed for its map of the world (actually an example of a Roman itinerarium). It was designed by Marcus Vipsanius Agrippa and constructed by his sister Vipsania Polla after Agrippa died. The map was named either directly after Vipsania Polla or the gens Vipsania, which Polla and her brother Agrippa belonged to.

== History ==
Augustus had a world map engraved on marble, following the descriptions given in Agrippa's geographical work, the Commentarii. Agrippa began construction of the map before he died in 12 BC, after which his sister Vipsania Polla oversaw the project. It was not yet completed by 7 BC when Augustus opened the Campus Agrippae to the public. Polla had likely died before this as Augustus was the one who finished the project at a later date. It was the relatives of a person who were responsible for completing tasks begun by a person. Once his sister died, Augustus who was Agrippa's father-in-law likely felt responsible for it. It was considered inappropriate to interfere with another family's work so Augustus included a description of the portico that explained the process of its making. Although the Porticus Vipsania has not survived, a description of it is given in Natural History by Pliny the Elder, and it is also known through the Peutinger Map.

== Location ==
Plan of the central Campus Martius
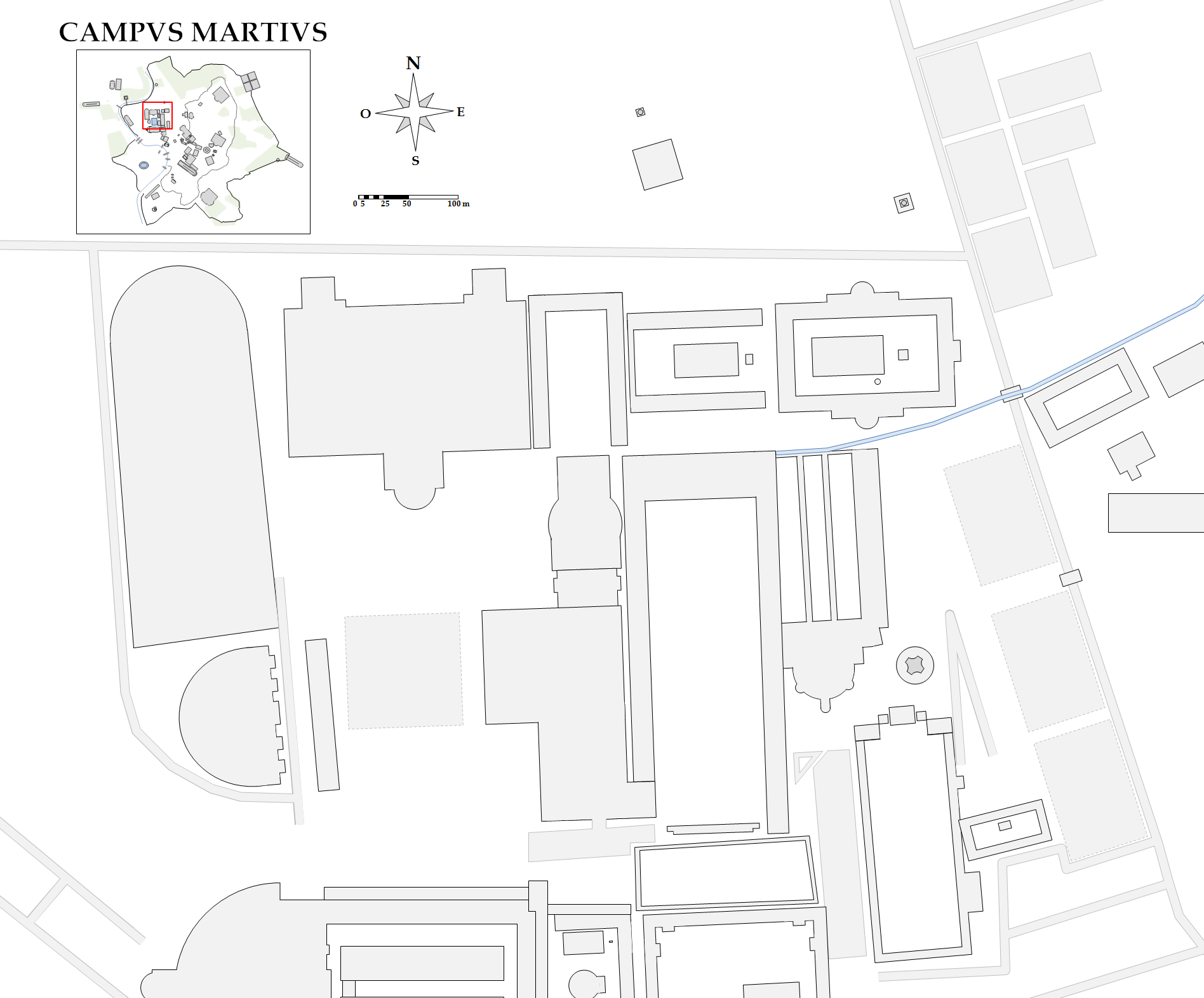

== See also ==
- Forma Urbis Romae
