= Michelle Moran =

American novelist

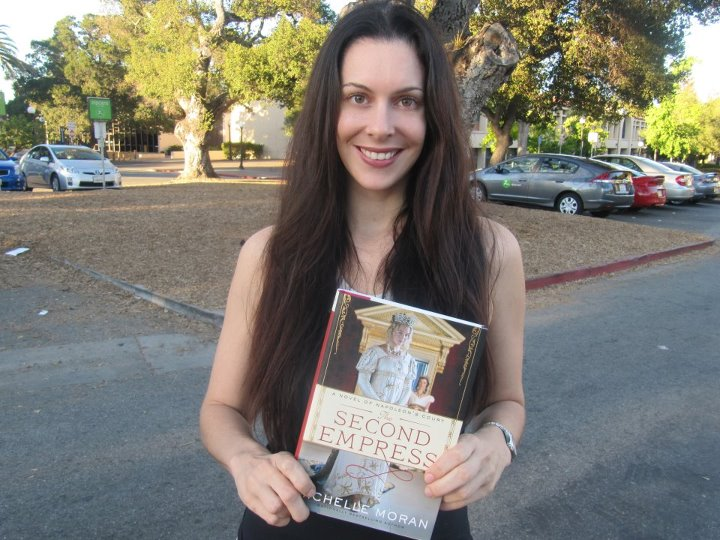
- Michelle Moran with a copy of her fifth book, The Second Empress
- Born: August 11, 1980 (age 46); San Fernando Valley, California, U.S.
- Occupation: Author
- Children: 2
- Writing career
- Genre: Historical novel
- Website: www.michellemoran.com

Michelle Moran (born August 11, 1980) is an American novelist known for her historical fiction writing.

== Biography ==
Michelle Moran was born in California's San Fernando Valley, August 11, 1980. She took an interest in writing from an early age, purchasing Writer's Market and submitting her stories and novellas to publishers from the time she was twelve. She majored in literature at Pomona College. Following a summer in Israel where she worked as a volunteer archaeologist, she earned an MA from the Claremont Graduate University.

Her experiences at archaeological sites were what inspired her to write historical fiction. A public high school teacher for six years, Moran is currently a full-time writer living in England.

Her first book (2003) was Jezebel, telling the story of this biblical character, a phoenician princess, grown up in a society which granted women relatively strong freedom rights and even powerful positions. She marries Ahab, the king of Israel and experiences intense cultural shock with this patriarchal society and its prophet Elia. This book was only published in Germany (titled Die Phönizierin). 2016 Morgan guessed a publication in the USA not likely because "Biblical fiction is a tough sell right now".

Her ensuing books turned national bestselling historical fiction novels.

The novel Nefertiti is placed in ancient Egypt and tells the story of Nefertiti's sister Mutnodjmet and the events of Nefertiti's marriage to Amenhotep IV until the time of her death. According to WorldCat, the book is held in 984 libraries.

The Heretic Queen tells the story of Nefertari, wife of Ramesses the Great and niece of the "heretic queen", Nefertiti.

Cleopatra's Daughter tells the story of Cleopatra Selene II and Alexander Helios, the twin children of Cleopatra VII and Mark Antony, in the aftermath of the great queen's death as well as living in Rome in the court of Octavian.

Her fifth book, Madame Tussaud, tells the story of Marie Grosholtz, the future "Madame Tussaud", and her rise to prominence as a wax artist during the French Revolution. It was optioned by Gaumont for a miniseries in 2011. Michael Hirst is writing the script.

Her sixth book, "The Second Empress," explores the lives of the women in Napoleon Bonaparte's world. This novel tells the story of Marie Louise, Duchess of Parma, Empress of France and Pauline Bonaparte.

Her seventh book, Rebel Queen, is set in India and talks about the queen Lakshmibai of Jhansi.

Her ninth book is "Mata Hari's Last Dance", telling the story of the famous Dutch dancer and spy Mata Hari.

The tenth book, Maria, tells the story of the Austrian singer and writer Maria von Trapp.

== Bibliography ==
- Die Phönizierin (2003), München: Wilhelm Goldmann Verlag (Random House Group). (Original title Jezebel). ISBN 3-442-35775-6
- Nefertiti: A Novel (2007), Hardback Berkeley, 2005, ISBN 978-0-307-38174-3
- The Heretic Queen (2008), Paperback Crown; 1 edition, 2009, ISBN 978-0-307-38176-7
- Cleopatra's Daughter (2009), Hardcover Crown; 1 edition, 2009, ISBN 978-0-307-40912-6
- Madame Tussaud: A Novel of the French Revolution (2011), ISBN 9780307588661
- The Second Empress: A Novel of Napoleons Court (2012), ISBN 978-0857388629
- Rebel Queen (2015), ISBN 9781476716350
- Mata Hari's Last Dance (2016), ISBN 9781476716350
- Maria: A Novel of Maria von Trapp (2024), ISBN 9780593499481
