= Pseudo-Victor =

Pseudo-Victor is conventional designation for the unknown author of either of two works misattributed to Aurelius Victor:

- Epitome de Caesaribus
- Origo gentis Romanae
