= Cleopatra's Daughter (novel) =

2010 novel by Michelle Moran

- Cover of the 2010 Three Rivers Press edition
- Author: Michelle Moran
- Genre: Historical fiction
- Publisher: Crown Publishing Group
- Publication date: July 13, 2010
- ISBN: 9780307409133

Cleopatra's Daughter is a 2010 historical fiction novel by Michelle Moran. It was published by Crown Publishing Group.

== Synopsis ==
The novel focuses on Cleopatra Selene II, the daughter of Mark Antony and Cleopatra, who lives in the court of their enemy Augustus after her parents' death.

== Reception ==
Lianne Kolirin of Daily Express called it "an intelligent historical novel" that "[draws] a vivid picture of the horrors and glories of life in ancient Rome." Michelle Smith, in a review for BookReporter, wrote that "It is a mesmerizing story that will leave you caring deeply for many people in it. Clearly Moran genuinely cares for the characters she writes --- and for their authenticity, as personas are far from black and white."

Snjezana Bobic of Fantasy Book Review praised the book's characters and historical accuracy.

The book received a negative review in the Historical Novel Society's magazine, which called the book "a disappointment".
