= Emily Albu =

American professor (born 1945)

Emily Albu (born November 21, 1945) is a professor of classics at the University of California, Davis. She teaches both undergraduate and graduate courses in the field of classics and sits on several committees and boards. Her research focuses on the history of Christianity in late antiquity, and the Middle Ages. She is the author of a number of books, reviews, and articles.

== Biography ==
Emily Albu is a professor of classics at the University of California, Davis where she has held various positions since 1995. She teaches undergraduate classes in areas such as classics, Greek, Latin literature, Roman comedy, the history of women in the Middle Ages, and films on the ancient world. Her graduate seminars include various topics concerning late antiquity and methodological approaches to the study of the classical world. At UC Davis she was a member of the Committee on Committees in 2017-18, and as of 2019 she was a member of the Program Committee for Medieval and Early Modern Studies. Since 2019, she has served as associate editor of the University of California Press journal Studies in Late Antiquity (SLA). Albu was a visiting professor of classics at the University of Virginia in fall 2014, 2016, and 2018. Since 2007, Albu has been on the Statewide Advisory Board for California History - Social Science Project through the California Subject Matter Project, which works to provide high-quality professional development and historical instruction in California schools.

== Education ==
In 1967, Albu obtained a Bachelor of Arts in Latin and Greek from the College of Wooster. She went on to the University of California, Berkeley, where she obtained a Master of Arts in comparative literature, focusing on Latin and Greek in 1969, and a Ph.D. in comparative literature, with an emphasis in medieval Latin, Byzantine Greek, and Old French/Old Provençal in 1975.

== Research ==
As a current active emerita at the University of California, Davis, Albu plans to remain active in scholarship post-retirement. Her research interests include the reception of classical culture, Late Antiquity, the twelfth century, mapping the world in the Middle Ages, and medieval histories and monastic chronicles.

== Books ==
2014: The Medieval Peutinger Map: Imperial Roman Revival in a German Empire (Cambridge: Cambridge University Press).

2006: Violence in Late Antiquity: Perceptions and Practices, ed. H.A. Drake and eo-ed. Emily Albu, Susanna Elm, Michael Maas, Claudia Rapp, Michele Salzman (Hampshire, England, and Burlington, VT: Ashgate).

2001: The Normans in Their Histories: Propaganda, Myth, and Subversion (Woodbridge, Suffolk, UK: Boydell and Brewer).

1998: Christianity: A Social and Cultural History, 2nd ed., with Howard Clark Kee, Carter Lindberg, J. William Frost, and Dana Robert. Upper Saddle River, NJ: Prentice Hall, 1998; 113-202. (6 chapters slightly revised from the 1991 Macmillan edition).

1998: An annotated bibliography of Byzantine sources in English translation, Emily Albu

1994: Through the Eye of a Needle: Judeo-Christian Roots of Social Welfare, ed. with Carter Lindberg. Kirksville, Missouri: Thomas Jefferson University Press.

1991: Christianity: A Social and Cultural History, with Howard Clark Kee, Carter Lindberg, Jean-Loup Seban, and Mark A. Noll. New York: Macmillan; 145-255. (6 chapters, from 324 through the eleventh century).
