= Campus Agrippae =

Area within the boundaries of ancient Rome

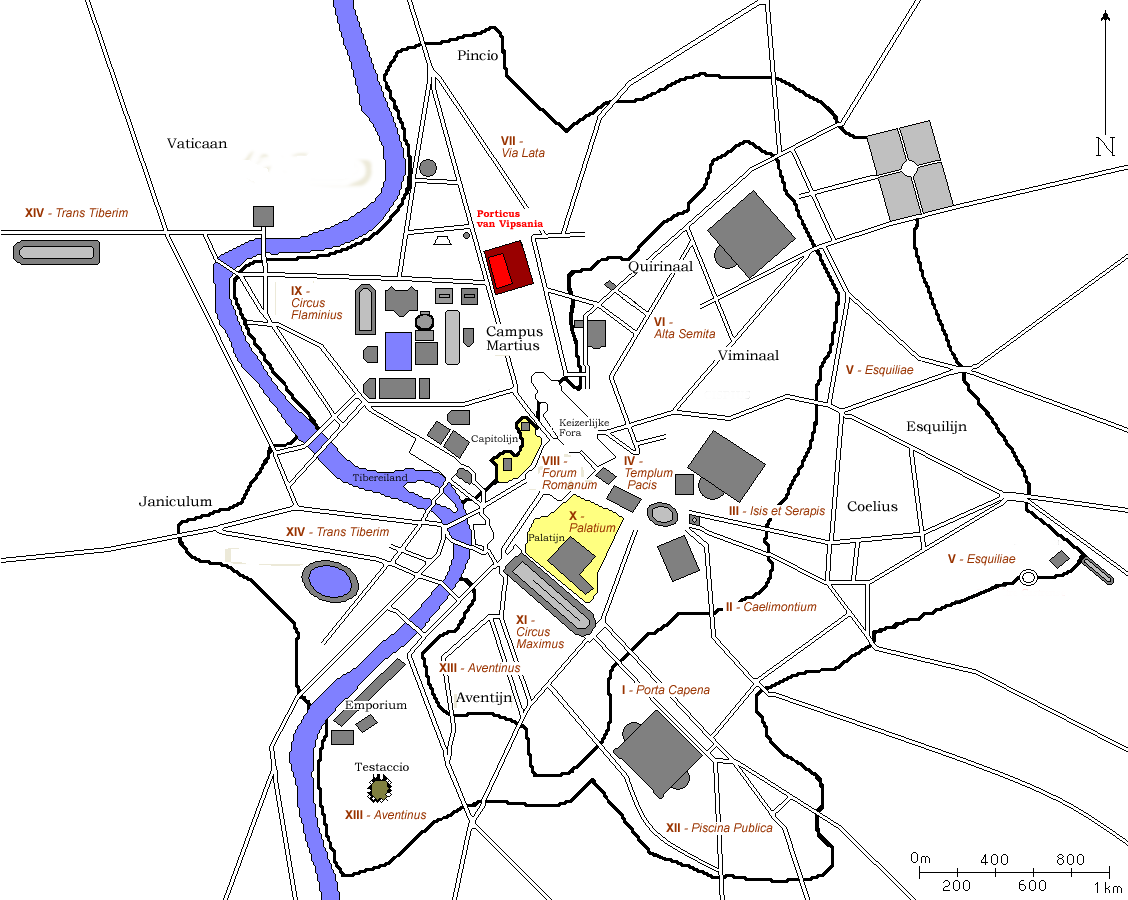
Map of the area

The Campus Agrippae is the area within the boundaries of ancient Rome named after Marcus Vipsanius Agrippa. A number of construction projects were developed within its perimeters, including the Porticus Vipsania, built by his sister, Vipsania Polla, and finished by Augustus, which ran along the western perimeter, against the Via Lata. There was also a race course. In 7 BCE, Augustus declared the Campus open to the public.

== General and cited references ==
- Bunsen, Matthew (2002). "Campus Agrippae". Encyclopedia of the Roman Empire, Revised Edition. New York: Facts On File. ISBN 9781438110271. OCLC 1035685825.
