= Agrippina =

Agrippina is an ancient Roman cognomen and a feminine given name. People with either the cognomen or the given name include:

== Cognomen ==
Relatives of the Roman general Marcus Vipsanius Agrippa:

- Vipsania Agrippina (36 BC–20 AD), first wife of the emperor Tiberius, daughter of Pomponia Caecilia Attica and Agrippa
- Vipsania Marcella Agrippina (likely born 28-22 BC), daughter of Claudia Marcella Major and Agrippa, married to general Publius Quinctilius Varus
- Vipsania Marcellina Agrippina (likely born between 27-21 BC), daughter of Claudia Marcella Major and Agrippa, married to Marcus Aemilius Lepidus
- Vipsania Julia Agrippina or Julia the Younger (19 BC–c. 29 AD), daughter of Julia the Elder and Agrippa
- Agrippina the Elder or Vipsania Agrippina (c. 14 BC–AD 33), daughter of Julia the Elder and Agrippa, wife of Germanicus and mother of emperor Caligula
- Agrippina the Younger or Julia Agrippina (15–59 AD), daughter of Agrippina the Elder and Germanicus, wife of emperor Claudius, mother of emperor Nero

== Given name ==
- Agrippina of Mineo (died 262), Christian saint and martyr
- Agrippina or Gryfina of Halych (c. 1248–between 1305 and 1309), Princess of Kraków by marriage, later a nun and abbess
- Agrippina Fedorovna Chelyadnina (fl. 1538), royal governess of Tsar Ivan the Terrible
- Agrippina de la Cruz (born 1960), Filipino hurdler
- Agrippina Shin (born 1958), Uzbek politician, Minister of Preschool Education since 2017
- Agrippina Vaganova (1879–1951), Russian ballerina and ballet teacher
- Agrippina Volkonskaia (died 1732), Russian courtier, senior lady-in-waiting of Catherine I of Russia

== See also ==
- Agrippina (opera), opera by G. F. Handel
- Agrypina, 14th-century Lithuanian noblewoman
- Agrippa (disambiguation)
- Agrippinus (disambiguation)
- Vipsania (disambiguation)
