= King Herod Agrippa =

King Herod Agrippa may refer to:

- Herod Agrippa I, who killed James the son of Zebedee and imprisoned Peter
- Herod Agrippa II, who listened to Paul's defense

== See also ==
- Agrippa (disambiguation)
- King Agrippa (disambiguation)
