= Agrippa =

Agrippa may refer to:

== People ==
=== Antiquity ===
- Agrippa (mythology), semi-mythological king of Alba Longa
- Agrippa (astronomer), Greek astronomer from the late 1st century
- Agrippa the Skeptic, Skeptic philosopher at the end of the 1st century
- Agrippa Menenius Lanatus, Roman consul in 503 BC
- Marcus Vipsanius Agrippa (63–12 BC), Roman statesman and general, friend and lieutenant of Augustus Caesar
- Agrippa Postumus (12 BC–AD 14), grandson of Roman Emperor Augustus and adopted as heir
- Gaius Fonteius Agrippa, father and son with the same name; the former an accuser of Libo, the latter suffect consul in AD 58
- Decimus Haterius Agrippa, consul in AD 22
- Marcus Asinius Agrippa, consul in AD 25
- Vibullius Agrippa, committed suicide in the Roman senate in AD 36
- Herod Agrippa, (10 BC–AD 44) grandson of Herod the Great, king of Judea, friend of Emperor Claudius
- Herod Agrippa II, (AD 27–100), his son
- Agrippa Castor, Christian Roman writer of the 2nd century
- Julius Agrippa, Centurion of the 2nd century
- Marcius Agrippa, slave of the 3rd century who was eventually elevated to senatorial rank by Macrinus

=== Modern era ===
- Heinrich Cornelius Agrippa (1486–1535), occultist, philosopher, and theologian
- Camillo Agrippa, sixteenth-century architect who applied geometric theory to the art of fencing
- Agrippa d'Aubigné (1552–1630), French poet, soldier, propagandist and chronicler
- Agrippa Masiyakurima, Zimbabwean Engineer, and Entrepreneur.

== Fictional characters ==
- Mumboz Agrippa, a character from the Zork series of computer games
- Salome Agrippa, a character from True Blood
- Mighty Agrippa, Roman God of the Aqueduct, a character from The Tick
- Agrippa, a character from the video game Amnesia: The Dark Descent, likely based on Heinrich Cornelius Agrippa
- Agrippa, a character from the 1845 children's book Struwwelpeter

== Other uses ==
- Agrippa (praenomen), a Latin personal name
- Agrippa (crater), an impact crater on the Moon
- Agrippa (A Book of the Dead), a 1992 work of art by William Gibson and others
- A fictional space destroyer in the Earth Alliance Civil War in the Babylon 5 television series
- Pedestal of Agrippa in Athens

== See also ==
- Agrippina (disambiguation)
- Agrippinus (disambiguation)
- King Agrippa (disambiguation)
