= Agrippina (disambiguation) =

Agrippina is an ancient Roman cognomen and a given name.

Agrippina may also refer to:

- Agrippina (opera), an opera by George Frideric Handel
- Agrippina (film), a 1911 Italian film
- 645 Agrippina, an asteroid

== See also ==
Insects:

- Catocala agrippina
- Thysania agrippina
- Synechodes agrippina
- Midila agrippina
- Pseudaletis agrippina
- Villa agrippina
