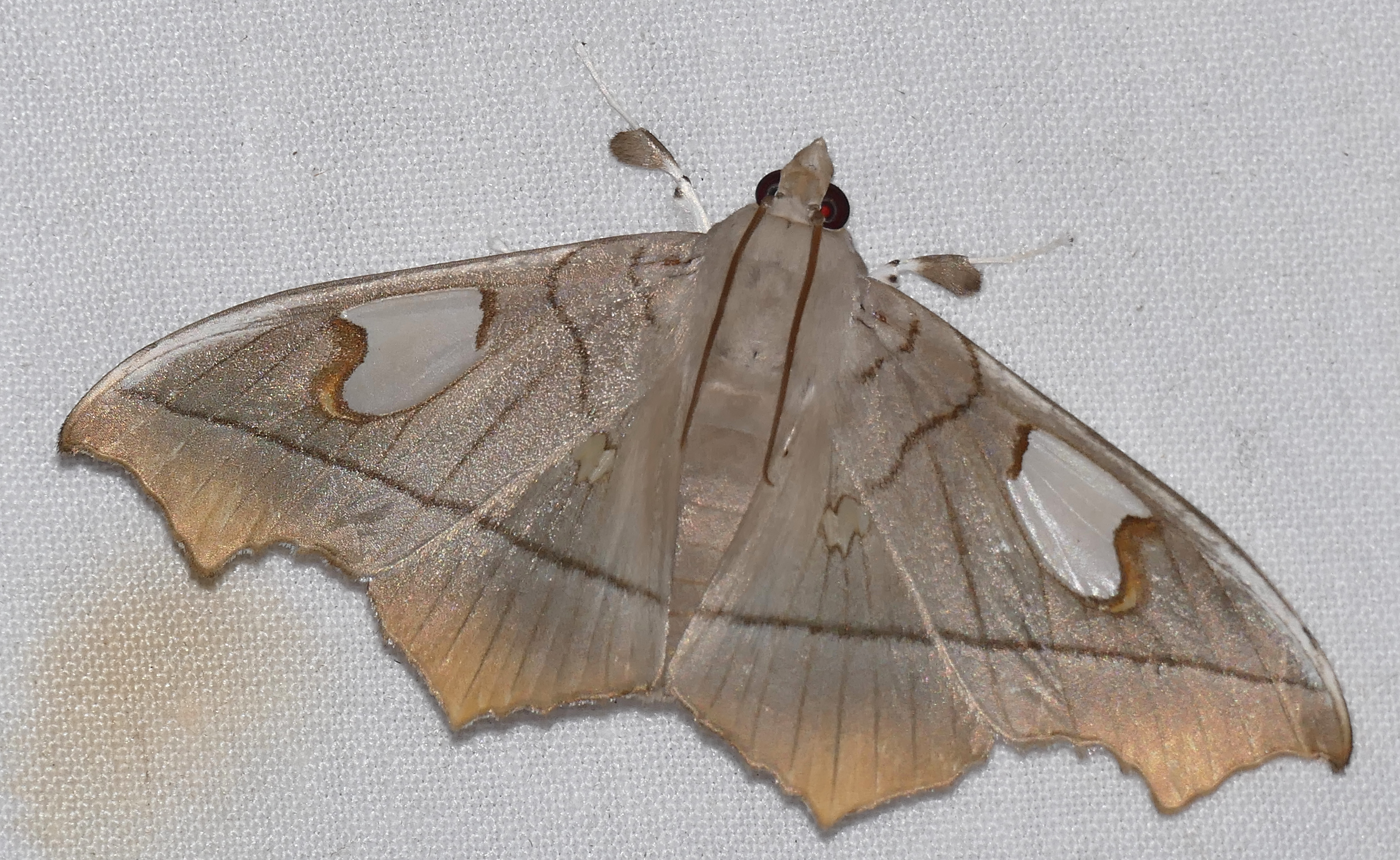
- Midila lamia

Scientific classification
- Kingdom: Animalia
- Phylum: Arthropoda
- Class: Insecta
- Order: Lepidoptera
- Family: Crambidae
- Subfamily: Midilinae; Munroe, 1958

= Midilinae =

Subfamily of moths

Midilinae is a subfamily of the lepidopteran family Crambidae. It was described by Eugene G. Munroe in 1958. The 11 genera altogether comprise 59 species, with the majority of them occurring in the Neotropical realm, whereas the species of the genera Dolichobela and Styphlolepis are found in Australia.

== Genera ==
The following genera are classified in the subfamily Midilinae:

- Cacographis Lederer, 1863 (= Zazanisa Walker, 1865)
- Dismidila Dyar, 1914
- Dolichobela Turner, 1932
- Eupastranaia Becker, 1973 (= Pastranaia Munroe, 1970)
- Gonothyris Hampson, 1896
- Hositea Dyar, 1910
- Midila Walker, 1859 (= Singamia Möschler, 1882, Tetraphana Ragonot, 1891)
- Odilla Schaus, 1940
- Phryganomima Hampson, 1917
- Pycnarmodes Becker, 2022
- Styphlolepis Hampson, 1896
