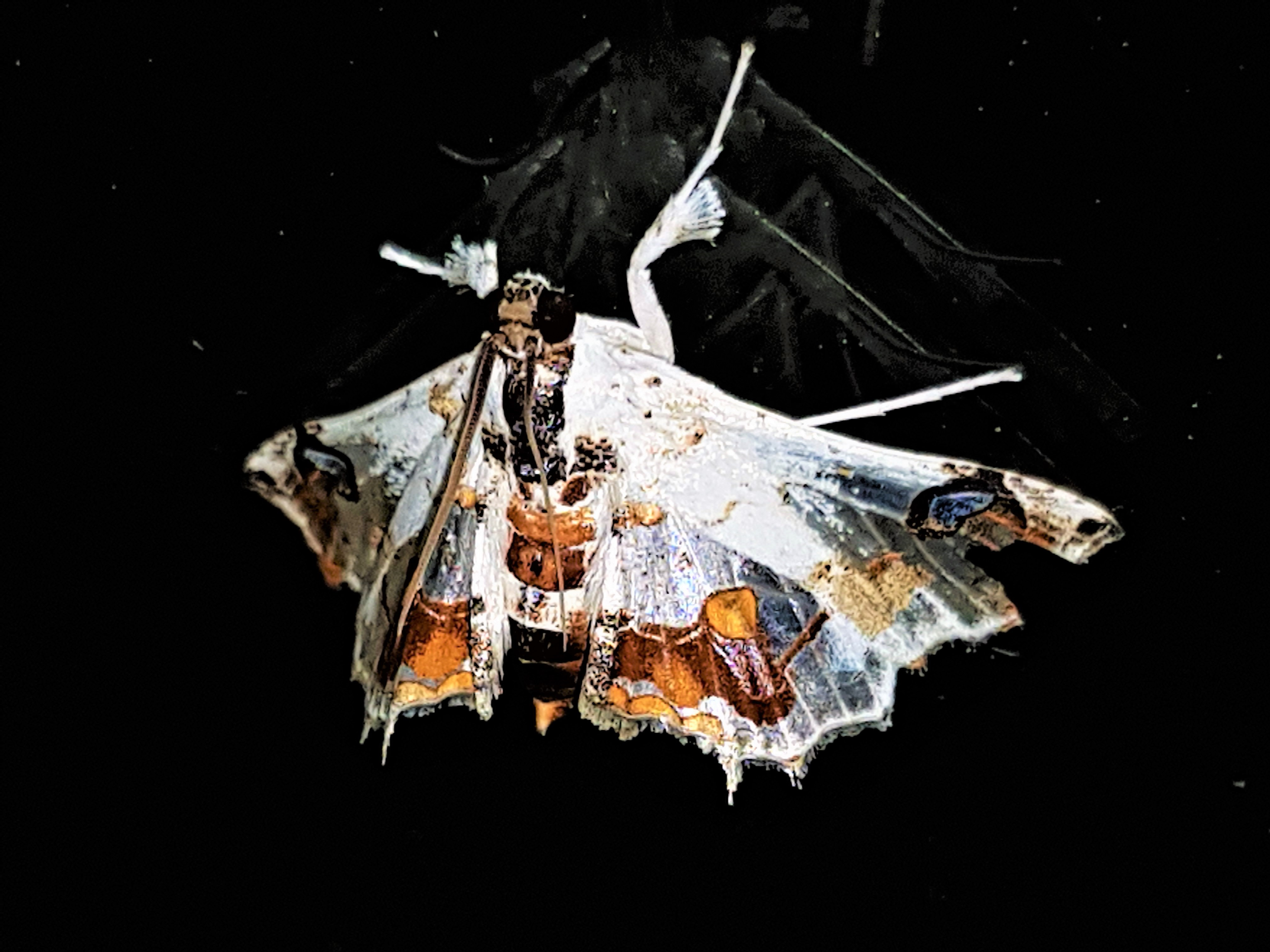

Scientific classification
- Domain: Eukaryota
- Kingdom: Animalia
- Phylum: Arthropoda
- Class: Insecta
- Order: Lepidoptera
- Family: Crambidae
- Subfamily: Midilinae
- Genus: Hositea
- Species: H. regina

Binomial name
- Hositea regina Munroe, 1970

= Hositea regina =

Species of moth

Hositea regina is a moth in the family Crambidae described by Eugene G. Munroe in 1970. It is found in Santa Catarina, Brazil.
