= Midila bordonorum =

Scientific classification
- Domain: Eukaryota
- Kingdom: Animalia
- Phylum: Arthropoda
- Class: Insecta
- Order: Lepidoptera
- Family: Crambidae
- Genus: Midila
- Species: M. bordonorum

Binomial name
- Midila bordonorum Munroe, 1972

Species of moth

Midila bordonorum is a moth in the family Crambidae. It was described by Eugene G. Munroe in 1972. It is found in Venezuela.
