= Midila larua =

Scientific classification
- Domain: Eukaryota
- Kingdom: Animalia
- Phylum: Arthropoda
- Class: Insecta
- Order: Lepidoptera
- Family: Crambidae
- Genus: Midila
- Species: M. larua

Binomial name
- Midila larua Munroe, 1970

Species of moth

Midila larua is a moth in the family Crambidae. It was described by Eugene G. Munroe in 1970. It is found in Venezuela.
