= Cacographis osteolalis =

Scientific classification
- Domain: Eukaryota
- Kingdom: Animalia
- Phylum: Arthropoda
- Class: Insecta
- Order: Lepidoptera
- Family: Crambidae
- Genus: Cacographis
- Species: C. osteolalis

Binomial name
- Cacographis osteolalis Lederer, 1863

Synonyms
- Zazanisa specularis Walker, 1865

Species of moth

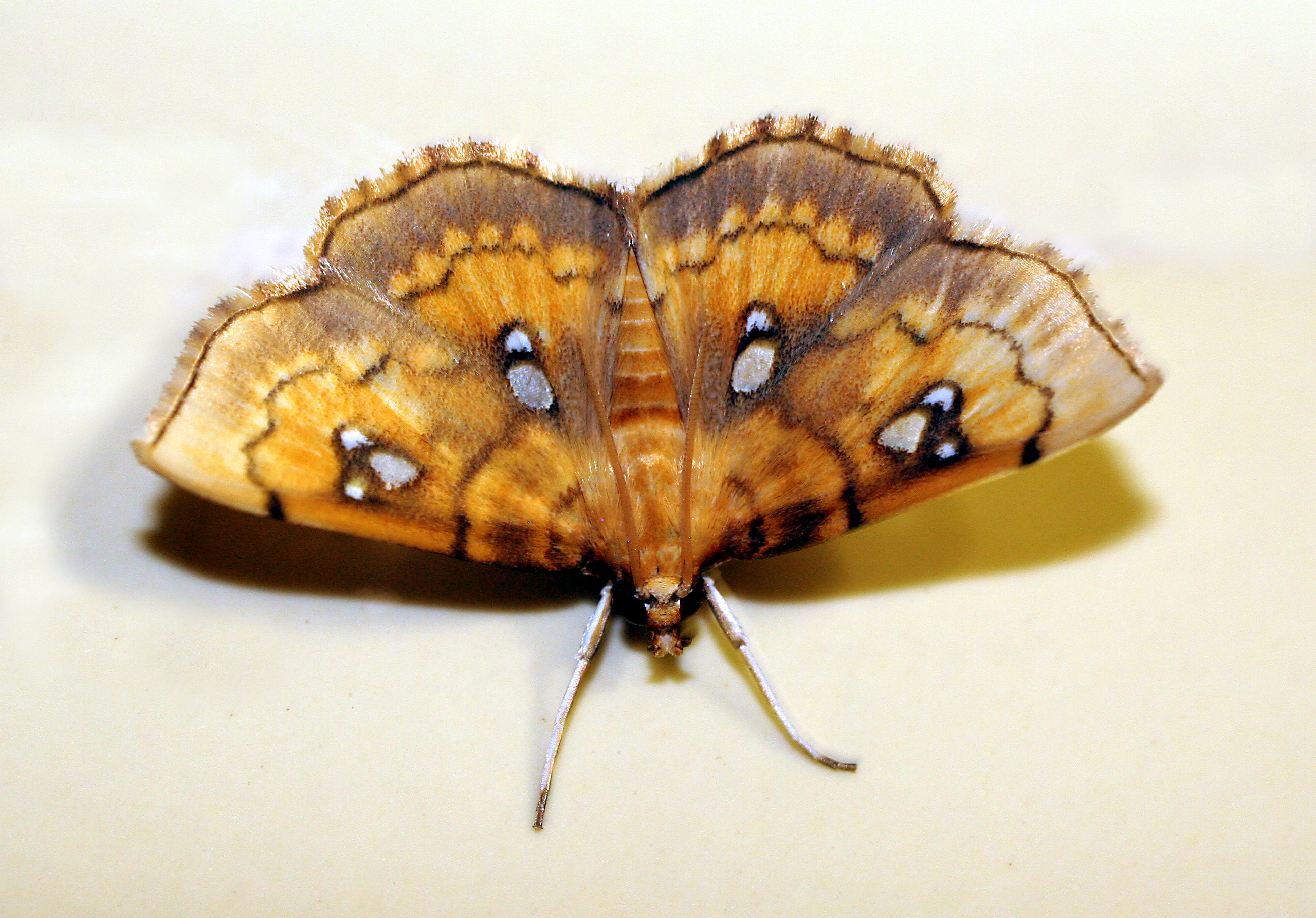
Specimen of a Cacographis osteolalis

Cacographis osteolalis is a moth in the family Crambidae. It was described by Julius Lederer in 1863. It is found in Venezuela, Peru, Colombia, Bolivia and Mexico.

== Subspecies ==
- Cacographis osteolalis osteolalis (Venezuela)
- Cacographis osteolalis azteca Munroe, 1970 (Mexico: Chiapas)
- Cacographis osteolalis inca Munroe, 1970 (Peru)
- Cacographis osteolalis sara Munroe, 1970 (Bolivia)
