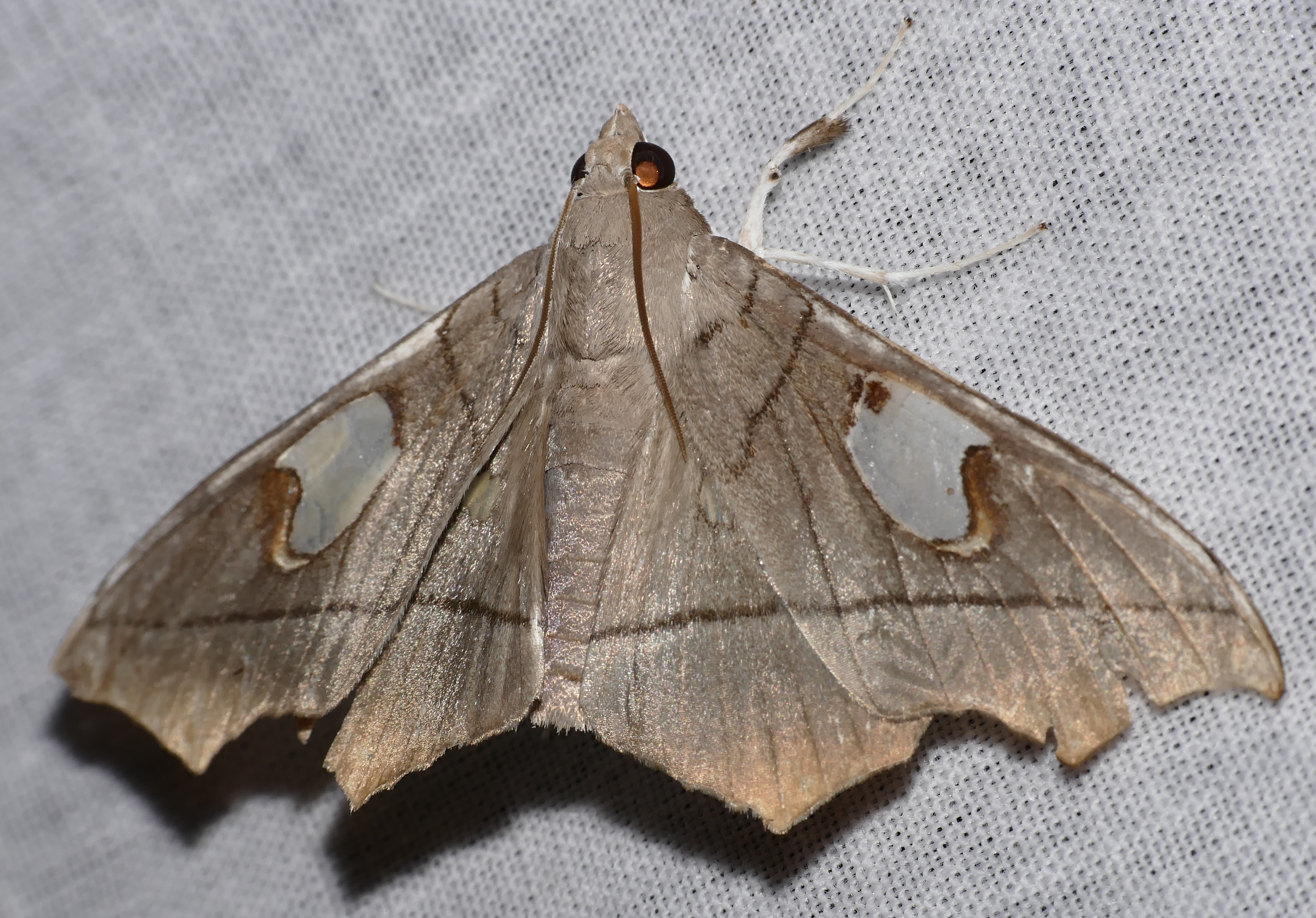

Scientific classification
- Kingdom: Animalia
- Phylum: Arthropoda
- Class: Insecta
- Order: Lepidoptera
- Family: Crambidae
- Genus: Eupastranaia
- Species: E. tumidifrons

Binomial name
- Eupastranaia tumidifrons (Munroe, 1970)

Synonyms
- Pastranaia tumidifrons Munroe, 1970

= Eupastranaia tumidifrons =

Species of moth

Eupastranaia tumidifrons is a moth in the family Crambidae. It was described by Eugene G. Munroe in 1970. It is found in Brazil. Its kingdom is animalia, phylum is arthropoda, class is insecta and order is lepidoptera.
