= Cacographis =

Scientific classification
- Kingdom: Animalia
- Phylum: Arthropoda
- Clade: Pancrustacea
- Class: Insecta
- Order: Lepidoptera
- Family: Crambidae
- Subfamily: Midilinae
- Genus: Cacographis; Lederer, 1863

Synonyms
- Zazanisa Walker, 1865

Genus of moths

Cacographis is a genus of moths of the family Crambidae.

== Species ==
- Cacographis macrops Munroe, 1970
- Cacographis osteolalis Lederer, 1863
- Cacographis undulalis Schaus, 1913
