= Eupastranaia fenestrata =

Scientific classification
- Domain: Eukaryota
- Kingdom: Animalia
- Phylum: Arthropoda
- Class: Insecta
- Order: Lepidoptera
- Family: Crambidae
- Genus: Eupastranaia
- Species: E. fenestrata

Binomial name
- Eupastranaia fenestrata (Ménétries, 1863)

Synonyms
- Hygrochroa fenestrata Ménétries, 1863

Species of moth

Eupastranaia fenestrata is a moth in the family Crambidae. It was described by Édouard Ménétries in 1863. It is found in Bahia state in Brazil and Argentina.
