= Midila martineziana =

Scientific classification
- Domain: Eukaryota
- Kingdom: Animalia
- Phylum: Arthropoda
- Class: Insecta
- Order: Lepidoptera
- Family: Crambidae
- Genus: Midila
- Species: M. martineziana

Binomial name
- Midila martineziana Pastrana, 1960

Species of moth

Midila martineziana is a moth in the family Crambidae. It was described by Pastrana in 1960. It is found in Bolivia.
