= Eupastranaia lilacina =

Scientific classification
- Domain: Eukaryota
- Kingdom: Animalia
- Phylum: Arthropoda
- Class: Insecta
- Order: Lepidoptera
- Family: Crambidae
- Genus: Eupastranaia
- Species: E. lilacina

Binomial name
- Eupastranaia lilacina (Pagenstecher, 1892)

Synonyms
- Tetraphana lilacina Pagenstecher, 1892; Midila martinezi Pastrana, 1952; Midila sulphurata Whalley, 1958

Species of moth

Eupastranaia lilacina is a moth in the family Crambidae. It was described by Pagenstecher in 1892. It is found in Bolivia.
