= Hositea cyanops =

Scientific classification
- Domain: Eukaryota
- Kingdom: Animalia
- Phylum: Arthropoda
- Class: Insecta
- Order: Lepidoptera
- Family: Crambidae
- Genus: Hositea
- Species: H. cyanops

Binomial name
- Hositea cyanops Munroe, 1970

Species of moth

Hositea cyanops is a moth in the family Crambidae. It was described by Eugene G. Munroe in 1970. It is found in Suriname.
