= Cacographis undulalis =

Scientific classification
- Domain: Eukaryota
- Kingdom: Animalia
- Phylum: Arthropoda
- Class: Insecta
- Order: Lepidoptera
- Family: Crambidae
- Genus: Cacographis
- Species: C. undulalis

Binomial name
- Cacographis undulalis Schaus, 1913

Species of moth

Cacographis undulalis is a moth in the family Crambidae. It was described by Schaus in 1913. It is found in Costa Rica.
