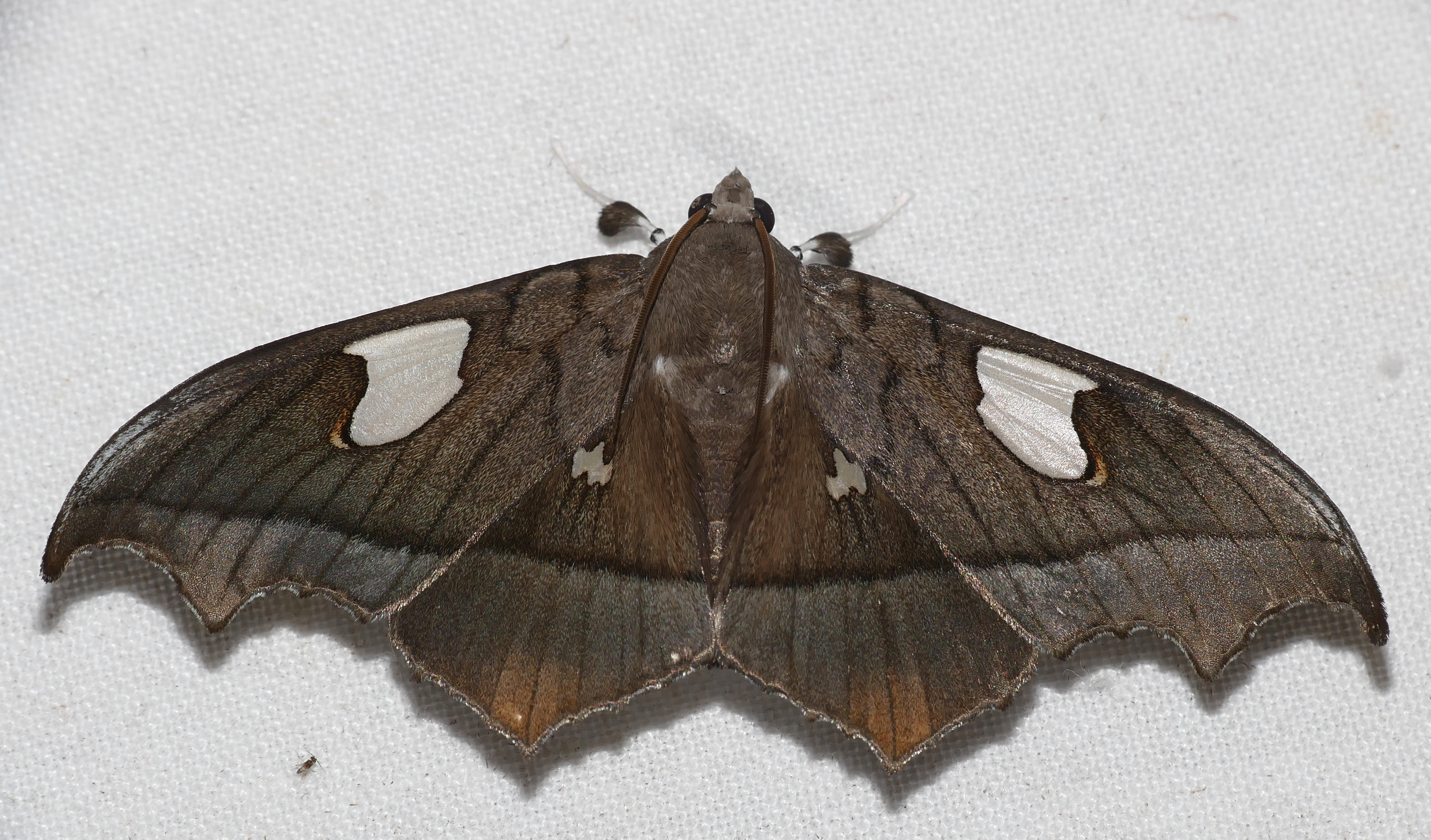

Scientific classification
- Domain: Eukaryota
- Kingdom: Animalia
- Phylum: Arthropoda
- Class: Insecta
- Order: Lepidoptera
- Family: Crambidae
- Genus: Midila
- Species: M. quadrifenestrata

Binomial name
- Midila quadrifenestrata (Herrich-Schäffer, [1858])

Synonyms
- Ametria quadrifenestrata Herrich-Schäffer, [1858]; Midila orfilai Pastrana, 1960

= Midila quadrifenestrata =

Species of moth

Midila quadrifenestrata is a moth in the family Crambidae. It was described by Gottlieb August Wilhelm Herrich-Schäffer in 1858. It is found in Brazil, Bolivia and French Guiana.

== Subspecies ==
- Midila quadrifenestrata quadrifenestrata (Brazil)
- Midila quadrifenestrata attacalis Walker, 1859 (Bolivia)
- Midila quadrifenestrata subfuscifusa Munroe, 1970 (French Guiana)
