= Midila leonila =

Scientific classification
- Domain: Eukaryota
- Kingdom: Animalia
- Phylum: Arthropoda
- Class: Insecta
- Order: Lepidoptera
- Family: Crambidae
- Genus: Midila
- Species: M. leonila

Binomial name
- Midila leonila Lopez, 1985

Species of moth

Midila leonila is a moth in the family Crambidae. It was described by M. G. Lopez-Torres in 1985. It is found in Hidalgo, Mexico.
