= Villa gracilis =

Scientific classification
- Kingdom: Animalia
- Phylum: Arthropoda
- Class: Insecta
- Order: Diptera
- Family: Bombyliidae
- Tribe: Villini
- Genus: Villa
- Species: V. gracilis

Binomial name
- Villa gracilis (Macquart, 1840)

Synonyms
- Anthrax gracilis Macquart, 1840

Species of fly

Villa gracilis is a species of bee fly in the family Bombyliidae.

== Distribution ==
United States.
