= Midila rommeli =

Scientific classification
- Domain: Eukaryota
- Kingdom: Animalia
- Phylum: Arthropoda
- Class: Insecta
- Order: Lepidoptera
- Family: Crambidae
- Genus: Midila
- Species: M. rommeli

Binomial name
- Midila rommeli Lopez, 1985

Species of moth

Midila rommeli is a moth in the family Crambidae. It was described by M. G. Lopez-Torres in 1985. It is found in Oaxaca, Mexico.
