= Styphlolepis squamosalis =

Scientific classification
- Kingdom: Animalia
- Phylum: Arthropoda
- Class: Insecta
- Order: Lepidoptera
- Family: Crambidae
- Genus: Styphlolepis
- Species: S. squamosalis

Binomial name
- Styphlolepis squamosalis Hampson, 1896

Synonyms
- Styphlolepis peribarys Turner, 1922

Species of moth

Styphlolepis squamosalis is a moth in the family Crambidae. It was described by George Hampson in 1896. It is found in Australia, where it has been recorded from Queensland.

The wingspan is about 50 mm. The forewings are white, irrorated (sprinkled) with ferruginous scales and a ferruginous medial line. The hindwings have hardly any ferruginous tinge.
