= Vipsania (disambiguation) =

Vipsania was the name of the first wife of Roman emperor Tiberius.

Vapsania may also refer to:

== People ==
- Vipsania gens, a family of equestrian rank in ancient Rome
  - Vipsania Polla, sister of Agrippa
  - Vipsania (wife of Haterius), wife of Haterius, full sister of Tiberius wife
  - Vipsania Marcella, the name of two of Marcus Vipsanius Agrippa's daughters
    - Vipsania (wife of Varus), wife of Publius Quinctilius Varus
    - Vipsania (wife of Lepidus), wife of Marcus Aemilius Lepidus
  - Vipsania Julia or Julia the Younger (19 BC – c. AD 29), granddaughter of emperor Augustus
  - Agrippina the Elder (c. 14 BC – AD 33), mother of emperor Caligula

== Other uses ==
- Vipsania unicolora, a moth in Angola

== See also ==
- Agrippina (disambiguation)
