= Gonothyris =

Scientific classification
- Kingdom: Animalia
- Phylum: Arthropoda
- Class: Insecta
- Order: Lepidoptera
- Family: Crambidae
- Subfamily: Midilinae
- Genus: Gonothyris; Hampson, 1896
- Species: G. hyaloplaga

Binomial name
- Gonothyris hyaloplaga Hampson, 1896

Genus of moths

Gonothyris is a genus of moths of the family Crambidae described by George Hampson in 1896. It contains only one species, Gonothyris hyaloplaga, which is found in Rio de Janeiro, Brazil.

The wingspan is about 30 mm. The forewings are vinous red with an indistinct curved subbasal line with a grey speck at the costa. There is an oblique antemedial line arising from an outwardly oblique white costal fascia and there is a short medial white fascia on the costa, as well as a large hyaline (glass-like) lunule in the end of the cell. There is a marginal series of red spots. The hindwings are deeper vinous red with an oblique dark medial line.
