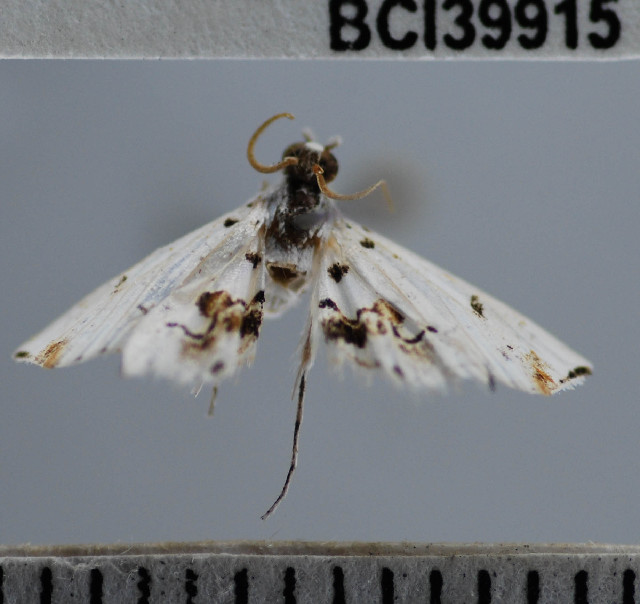
- Hositea bicincta

Scientific classification
- Domain: Eukaryota
- Kingdom: Animalia
- Phylum: Arthropoda
- Class: Insecta
- Order: Lepidoptera
- Family: Crambidae
- Subfamily: Midilinae
- Genus: Hositea; Dyar, 1910

= Hositea =

Genus of moths

Hositea is a genus of moths of the family Crambidae.

== Species ==
- Hositea bicincta Schaus, 1913
- Hositea cyanops Munroe, 1970
- Hositea gynaecia Dyar, 1910
- Hositea punctigera Munroe, 1970
- Hositea regina Munroe, 1970
