= Midila carneia =

Scientific classification
- Domain: Eukaryota
- Kingdom: Animalia
- Phylum: Arthropoda
- Class: Insecta
- Order: Lepidoptera
- Family: Crambidae
- Genus: Midila
- Species: M. carneia

Binomial name
- Midila carneia Druce, 1902

Species of moth

Midila carneia is a moth in the family Crambidae. It was described by Druce in 1902. It is found in Colombia.
