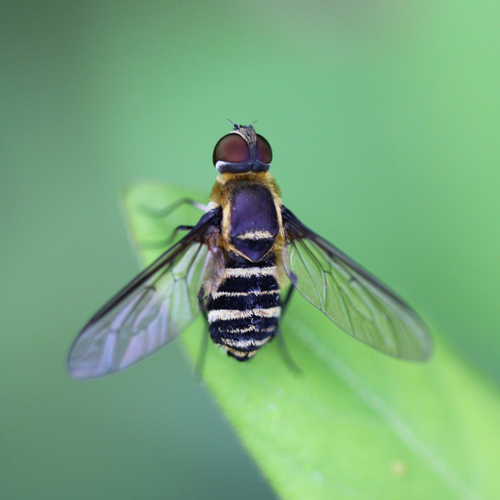

Scientific classification
- Domain: Eukaryota
- Kingdom: Animalia
- Phylum: Arthropoda
- Class: Insecta
- Order: Diptera
- Family: Bombyliidae
- Genus: Villa
- Species: V. lateralis

Binomial name
- Villa lateralis (Say, 1823)

= Villa lateralis =

Species of fly

Villa lateralis is a species of bee fly in the family Bombyliidae.

== Description ==
Villa lateralis has yellow hair around the sides of the thorax with yellow and black bands at the abdomen. They have a greyish face, and some specimens have a faint band of yellow at the base of the fourth segment silvery tufts on the terminal segment.

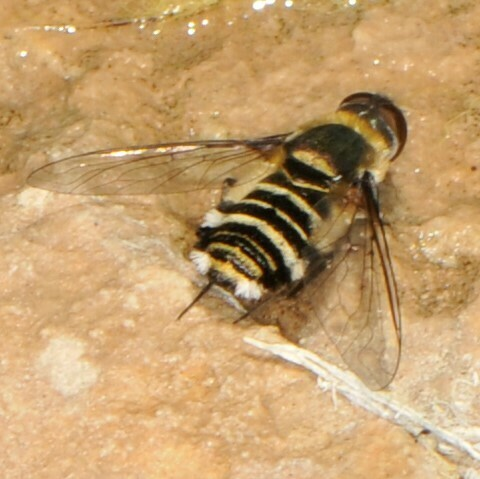
Villa lateralis

== Range ==
Villa lateralis is most commonly distributed throughout North America and Central America.
