= Eupastranaia =

Scientific classification
- Domain: Eukaryota
- Kingdom: Animalia
- Phylum: Arthropoda
- Class: Insecta
- Order: Lepidoptera
- Family: Crambidae
- Subfamily: Midilinae
- Genus: Eupastranaia; Becker, 1973

Synonyms
- Pastranaia Munroe, 1970

Genus of moths

Eupastranaia is a genus of moths of the family Crambidae.

== Species ==
- Eupastranaia fenestrata (Ménétries, 1863)
- Eupastranaia lilacina (Pagenstecher, 1892)
- Eupastranaia tumidifrons (Munroe, 1970)
