= Styphlolepis delopasta =

Scientific classification
- Kingdom: Animalia
- Phylum: Arthropoda
- Class: Insecta
- Order: Lepidoptera
- Family: Crambidae
- Genus: Styphlolepis
- Species: S. delopasta

Binomial name
- Styphlolepis delopasta Turner, 1942

Species of moth

Styphlolepis delopasta is a moth in the family Crambidae. It was described by Alfred Jefferis Turner in 1942. It is found in Australia, where it has been recorded from Queensland.
