= Hositea gynaecia =

Scientific classification
- Kingdom: Animalia
- Phylum: Arthropoda
- Class: Insecta
- Order: Lepidoptera
- Family: Crambidae
- Genus: Hositea
- Species: H. gynaecia

Binomial name
- Hositea gynaecia Dyar, 1910

Species of moth

Hositea gynaecia is a moth in the family Crambidae. It was described by Harrison Gray Dyar Jr. in 1910. It is found in Guyana.
