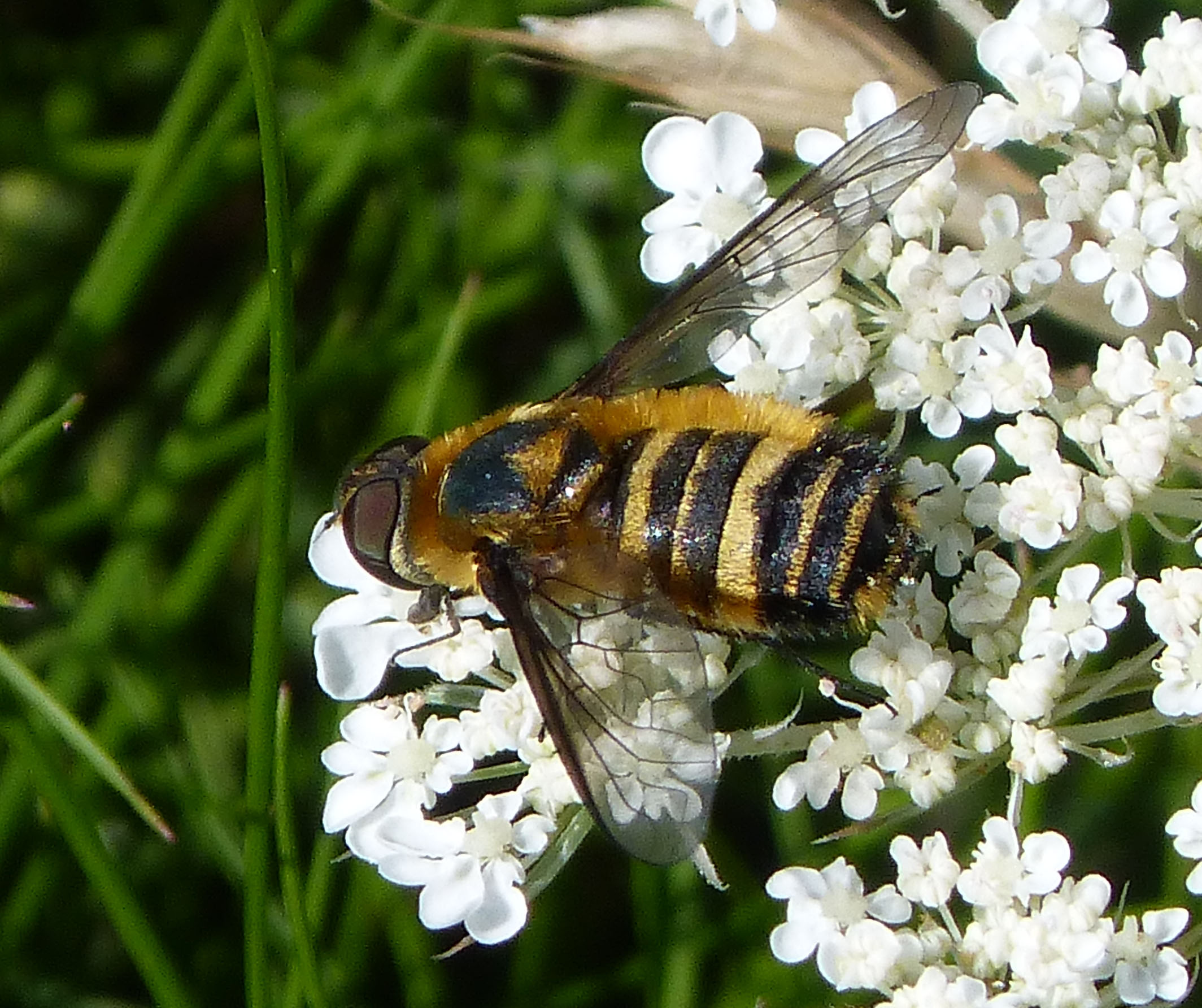
- Villa cingulata Hampshire, England

Scientific classification
- Kingdom: Animalia
- Phylum: Arthropoda
- Clade: Pancrustacea
- Class: Insecta
- Order: Diptera
- Family: Bombyliidae
- Subfamily: Anthracinae
- Tribe: Villini
- Genus: Villa
- Species: V. cingulata

Binomial name
- Villa cingulata (Meigen, 1804)

Synonyms
- Anthrax cingulata Meigen, 1804

= Villa cingulata =

Species of fly

Villa cingulata is a Palearctic species of bee fly in the family Bombyliidae. Seguy (1927) provides a key to most European Bombyliidae

== Distribution ==
Afghanistan, Albania, Armenia, Austria, Azerbaijan, Belgium, Bosnia-Hercegovina, Croatia, Czech Republic, Finland, France, Germany, Greece, Georgia, Hungary, Iran, Italy (incl. Sardinia, Sicily), Luxemburg, Macedonia, Moldova, Netherlands, Poland.
