= Styphlolepis leucosticta =

Scientific classification
- Kingdom: Animalia
- Phylum: Arthropoda
- Class: Insecta
- Order: Lepidoptera
- Family: Crambidae
- Genus: Styphlolepis
- Species: S. leucosticta

Binomial name
- Styphlolepis leucosticta Hampson, 1919

Species of moth

Styphlolepis leucosticta is a moth in the family Crambidae. It was described by George Hampson in 1919. It is found in Australia, where it has been recorded from Western Australia.

The wingspan is about 50 mm. The forewings are cupreous rufous, irrorated (sprinkled) with some dark brown scales. The costa is browner towards the base and terminal area. The hindwings are white, but pale cupreous brown in the apical area.
