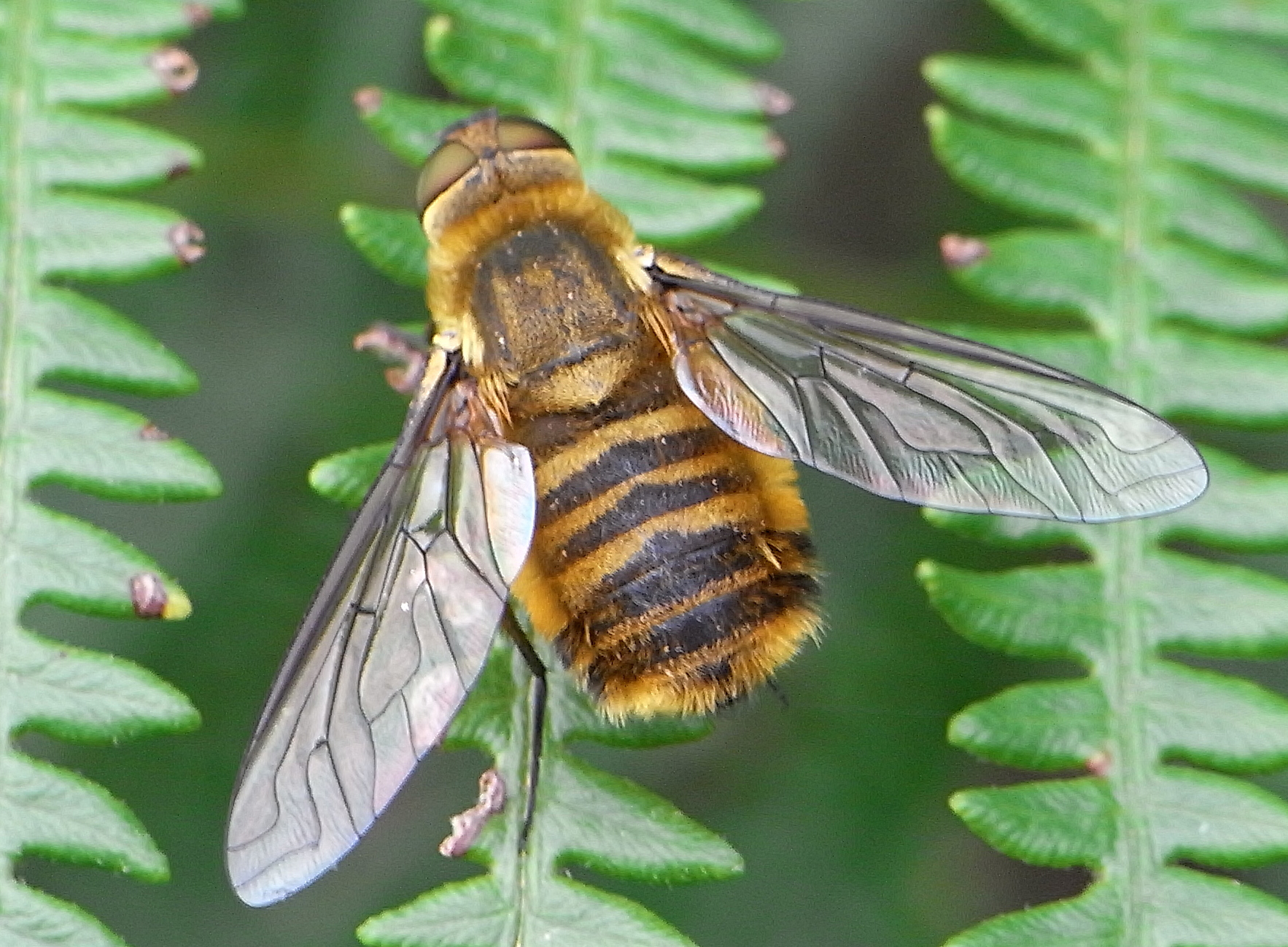
- Female Villa hottentotta

Scientific classification
- Kingdom: Animalia
- Phylum: Arthropoda
- Clade: Pancrustacea
- Class: Insecta
- Order: Diptera
- Family: Bombyliidae
- Subfamily: Anthracinae
- Tribe: Villini
- Genus: Villa; Lioy, 1864

Type species
- Anthrax abaddon Fabricius, 1794

Species
- See text

= Villa (fly) =

Genus of flies

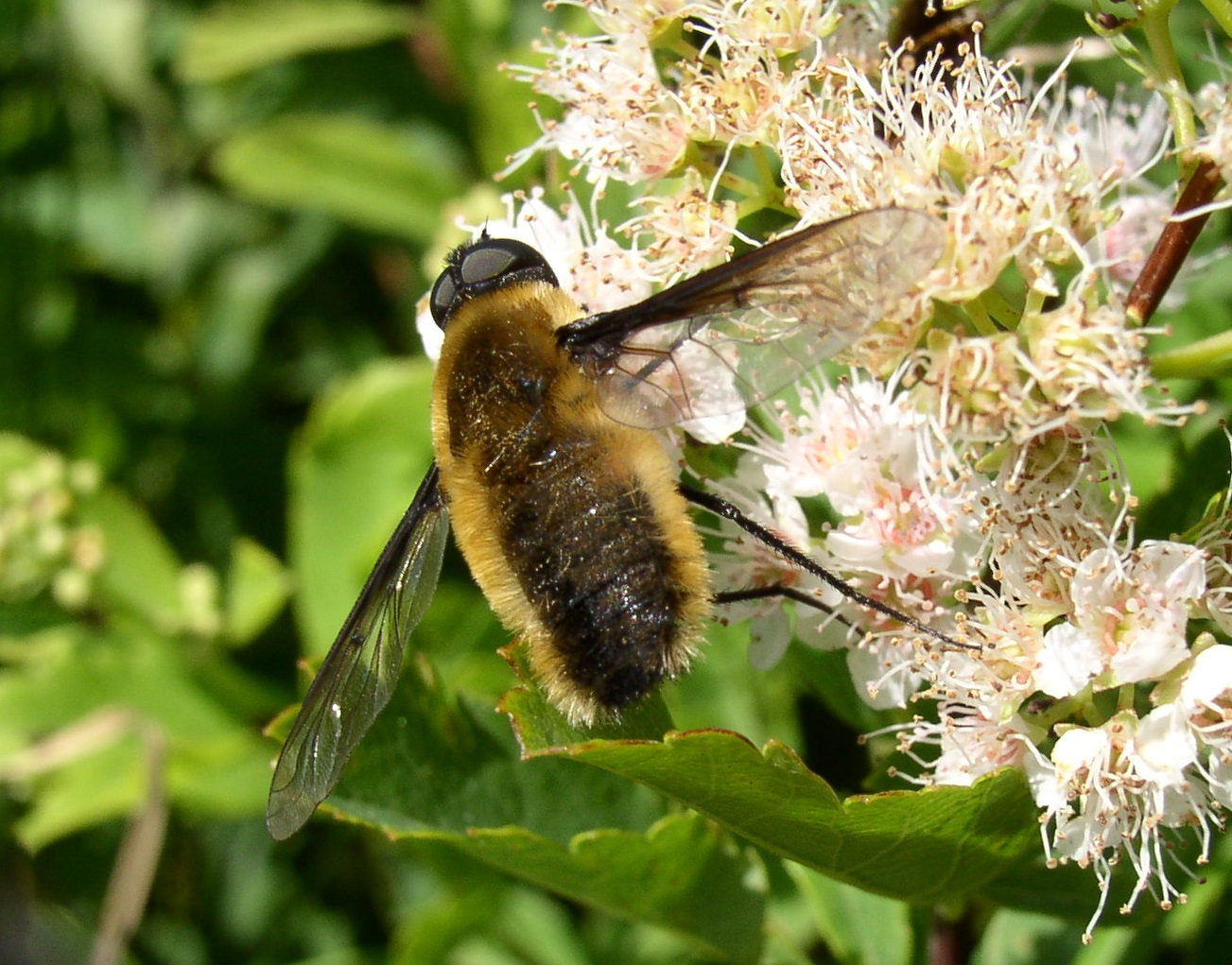
Villa fulviana. Cadillac Mountain, Acadia National Park, Hancock County, Maine, USA

Villa is a genus of flies belonging to the bee-fly family (Bombyliidae). They range in size from 5 to 17 millimetres (0.20 to 0.67 in), and have typically rounded heads. The males of some species have a brilliant mat of silvery patagial scales. About 270 Villa species are found on all continents except Antarctica.

== Selected species ==
- Villa abaddon (Fabricius, 1794)
- Villa adusta (Loew, 1869)
- Villa aenea (Coquillett, 1887)
- Villa agrippina (Osten Sacken, 1887)
- Villa albicollaris Cole, 1923
- Villa ariditata Cole, 1923
- Villa brunnea Becker, 1916
- Villa cana (Meigen, 1804)
- Villa chromolepida Cole, 1923
- Villa cingulata (Meigen, 1804)
- Villa cingulum (Wiedemann in Meigen 1820)
- Villa claripennis (Kowarz, 1867)
- Villa connexa (Macquart, 1855)
- Villa consessor (Coquillett, 1887)
- Villa deludens Francois 1966
- Villa distincta Meigen in Waltl, 1838
- Villa efflatouni El-Hawagry & Greathead, 2006
- Villa fasciculata Becker, 1916
- Villa faustina (Osten Sacken, 1887)
- Villa flavicincta Cole, 1923
- Villa flavocostalis Painter, 1926
- Villa fumicosta Painter, 1962
- Villa gemella (Coquillett, 1892)
- Villa gracilis (Macquart, 1840)
- Villa haesitans Becker, 1916
- Villa halteralis Kowarz, 1883
- Villa handfordi Curran, 1935
- Villa harveyi (Hine, 1904)
- Villa hottentotta (Linnaeus, 1758)
- Villa hypomelas (Macquart, 1840)
- Villa ixion (Fabricius, 1794)
- Villa lateralis (Say, 1823)
- Villa leucostoma (Meigen, 1820)
- Villa livia (Osten Sacken, 1887)
- Villa manillae Evenhuis, 1993
- Villa melaneura (Loew, 1869)
- Villa modesta (Meigen, 1820)
- Villa molitor (Loew, 1869)
- Villa moneta (Osten Sacken, 1887)
- Villa mucorea (Loew, 1869)
- Villa nebulo (Coquillett, 1887)
- Villa niphobleta (Loew, 1869)
- Villa nitida Cole, 1923
- Villa occulta (Wiedemann in Meigen 1820)
- Villa paramuscaria Evenhuis & Hall, 1989
- Villa peninsularis Cole, 1923
- Villa praeterissima Francois, 1967
- Villa pretiosa (Coquillett, 1887)
- Villa psammina Cole, 1960
- Villa sabina (Osten Sacken, 1887)
- Villa salebrosa Painter, 1926
- Villa scrobiculata (Loew, 1869)
- Villa senecio (Loew, 1869)
- Villa sexfasciata Wiedemann, 1821
- Villa semifulvipes Painter, 1962
- Villa shawii (Johnson, 1908)
- Villa sini Cole, 1923
- Villa sonorensis Cole, 1923
- Villa squamigera (Coquillett, 1892)
- Villa stenozoides El-Hawagry & Greathead, 2006
- Villa stenozona (Loew, 1869)
- Villa supina (Coquillett, 1887)
- Villa terrena (Coquillett, 1892)
- Villa tomentosa Becker, 1916
- Villa vacans (Coquillett, 1887)
- Villa vanduzeei Cole, 1923
- Villa vasitias (Cole, 1923)
- Villa venusta (Meigen, 1820)
- Villa vestita (Walker, 1849)
