= Villa chromolepida =

Scientific classification
- Kingdom: Animalia
- Phylum: Arthropoda
- Class: Insecta
- Order: Diptera
- Family: Bombyliidae
- Subfamily: Anthracinae
- Tribe: Villini
- Genus: Villa
- Species: V. chromolepida

Binomial name
- Villa chromolepida Cole, 1923

Species of fly

Villa chromolepida is a species of bee fly in the family Bombyliidae.

== Distribution ==
United States.
