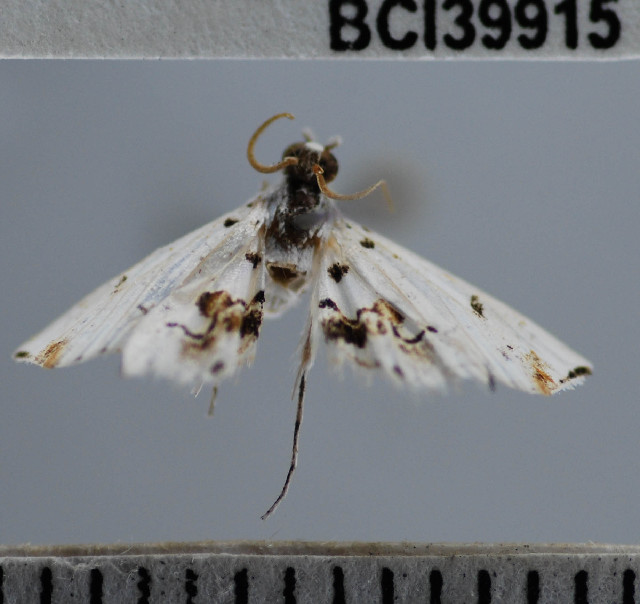

Scientific classification
- Domain: Eukaryota
- Kingdom: Animalia
- Phylum: Arthropoda
- Class: Insecta
- Order: Lepidoptera
- Family: Crambidae
- Genus: Hositea
- Species: H. bicincta

Binomial name
- Hositea bicincta Schaus, 1913

= Hositea bicincta =

Species of moth

Hositea bicincta is a moth in the family Crambidae. It was described by William Schaus in 1913. It is found in Costa Rica and Panama.
