= Styphlolepis agenor =

Scientific classification
- Kingdom: Animalia
- Phylum: Arthropoda
- Class: Insecta
- Order: Lepidoptera
- Family: Crambidae
- Genus: Styphlolepis
- Species: S. agenor

Binomial name
- Styphlolepis agenor Turner, 1915

Species of moth

Styphlolepis agenor is a moth in the family Crambidae. It was described by Alfred Jefferis Turner in 1915. It is found in Australia, where it has been recorded from New South Wales and Queensland.

The species has been reared from the trunk of Capparis mitchellii.
