= Midila albipes =

Scientific classification
- Domain: Eukaryota
- Kingdom: Animalia
- Phylum: Arthropoda
- Class: Insecta
- Order: Lepidoptera
- Family: Crambidae
- Genus: Midila
- Species: M. albipes

Binomial name
- Midila albipes (Pagenstecher, 1892)

Synonyms
- Tetraphana albipes Pagenstecher, 1892; Tetraphana alipes Pagenstecher, 1892

Species of moth

Midila albipes is a moth in the family Crambidae. It was described by Pagenstecher in 1892. It is found in Brazil (Amazonas).
