= Midila daphne =

Scientific classification
- Domain: Eukaryota
- Kingdom: Animalia
- Phylum: Arthropoda
- Class: Insecta
- Order: Lepidoptera
- Family: Crambidae
- Genus: Midila
- Species: M. daphne

Binomial name
- Midila daphne (Druce, 1895)

Synonyms
- Tetraphana daphne Druce, 1895

Species of moth

Midila daphne is a moth in the family Crambidae. It was described by Druce in 1895. It is found in Mexico, Costa Rica and Colombia.

== Subspecies ==
- Midila daphne daphne (Mexico)
- Midila daphne minor Munroe, 1970 (Colombia)
