= Midila thessala =

Scientific classification
- Domain: Eukaryota
- Kingdom: Animalia
- Phylum: Arthropoda
- Class: Insecta
- Order: Lepidoptera
- Family: Crambidae
- Genus: Midila
- Species: M. thessala

Binomial name
- Midila thessala Munroe, 1970

Species of moth

Midila thessala is a moth in the family Crambidae. It was described by Eugene G. Munroe in 1970. It is found in Bolivia.
