= Styphlolepis hypermegas =

Scientific classification
- Kingdom: Animalia
- Phylum: Arthropoda
- Class: Insecta
- Order: Lepidoptera
- Family: Crambidae
- Genus: Styphlolepis
- Species: S. hypermegas

Binomial name
- Styphlolepis hypermegas Turner, 1922

Species of moth

Styphlolepis hypermegas is a moth in the family Crambidae. It was described by Turner in 1922. It is found in Australia, where it has been recorded from New South Wales and Queensland.
