= Styphlolepis erythrocosma =

Scientific classification
- Kingdom: Animalia
- Phylum: Arthropoda
- Class: Insecta
- Order: Lepidoptera
- Family: Crambidae
- Genus: Styphlolepis
- Species: S. erythrocosma

Binomial name
- Styphlolepis erythrocosma Turner, 1942

Species of moth

Styphlolepis erythrocosma is a moth in the family Crambidae. It was described by Alfred Jefferis Turner in 1942. It is found in Australia, where it has been recorded from New South Wales.
