= Villa harveyi =

Scientific classification
- Kingdom: Animalia
- Phylum: Arthropoda
- Class: Insecta
- Order: Diptera
- Family: Bombyliidae
- Subfamily: Anthracinae
- Tribe: Villini
- Genus: Villa
- Species: V. harveyi

Binomial name
- Villa harveyi (Hine, 1904)

Synonyms
- Anthrax harveyi Hine, 1904

Species of fly

Villa harveyi is a species of bee fly in the family Bombyliidae.

== Distribution ==
Canada, United States.
