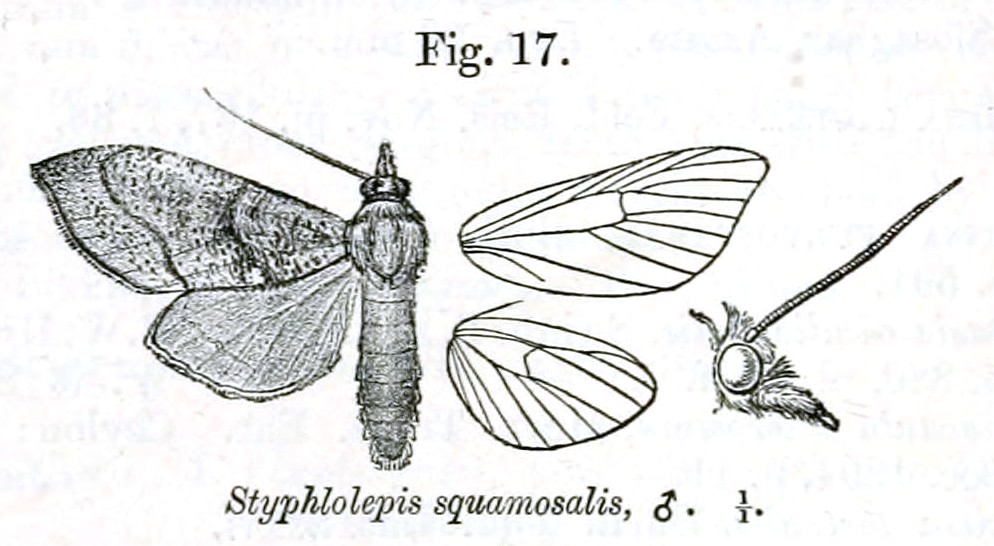
- Styphlolepis squamosalis Hampson, 1896

Scientific classification
- Kingdom: Animalia
- Phylum: Arthropoda
- Class: Insecta
- Order: Lepidoptera
- Family: Crambidae
- Subfamily: Midilinae
- Genus: Styphlolepis; Hampson, 1896

= Styphlolepis =

Genus of moths

Styphlolepis is a genus of moths of the family Crambidae.

== Species ==
- Styphlolepis agenor Turner, 1915
- Styphlolepis delopasta Turner, 1942
- Styphlolepis erythrocosma Turner, 1942
- Styphlolepis hypermegas Turner, 1922
- Styphlolepis leucosticta Hampson, 1919
- Styphlolepis squamosalis Hampson, 1896
