= Cacographis macrops =

Scientific classification
- Domain: Eukaryota
- Kingdom: Animalia
- Phylum: Arthropoda
- Class: Insecta
- Order: Lepidoptera
- Family: Crambidae
- Genus: Cacographis
- Species: C. macrops

Binomial name
- Cacographis macrops Munroe, 1970

Species of moth

Cacographis macrops is a moth in the family Crambidae. It was described by Eugene G. Munroe in 1970. It is found in Bolivia.
