= Midila guianensis =

Scientific classification
- Kingdom: Animalia
- Phylum: Arthropoda
- Clade: Pancrustacea
- Class: Insecta
- Order: Lepidoptera
- Family: Crambidae
- Genus: Midila
- Species: M. guianensis

Binomial name
- Midila guianensis Munroe, 1970

Species of moth

Midila guianensis is a moth in the family Crambidae. It was described by Eugene G. Munroe in 1970. It is found in French Guiana.
