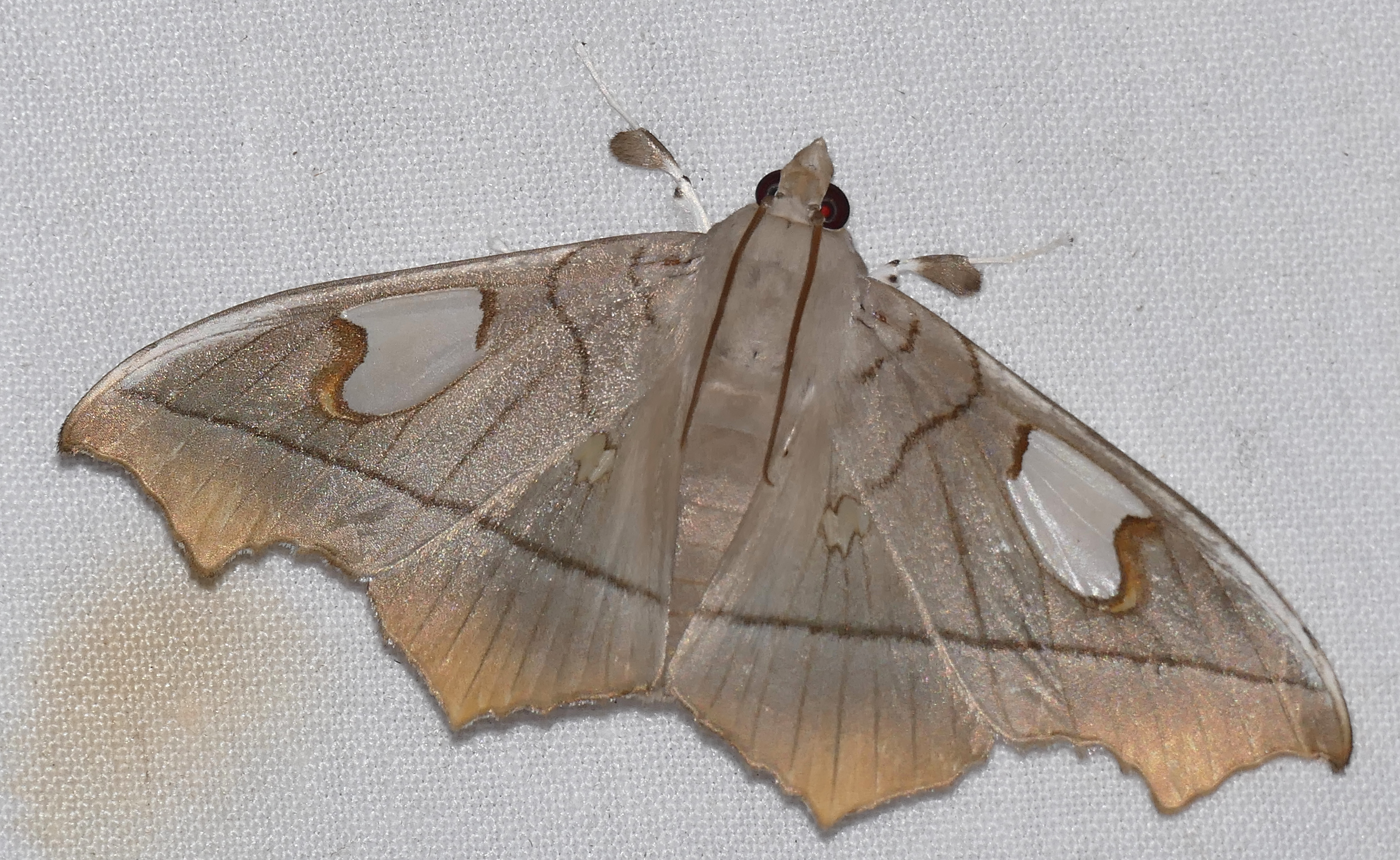
- Midila lamia

Scientific classification
- Domain: Eukaryota
- Kingdom: Animalia
- Phylum: Arthropoda
- Class: Insecta
- Order: Lepidoptera
- Family: Crambidae
- Subfamily: Midilinae
- Genus: Midila; Walker, 1859

Synonyms
- Singamia Möschler, 1882; Tetraphana Ragonot, 1891

= Midila =

Genus of moths

Midila is a genus of moths of the family Crambidae.

== Species ==
- Midila agrippina Munroe, 1970
- Midila albipes (Pagenstecher, 1892)
- Midila bordonorum Munroe, 1972
- Midila carneia Druce, 1902
- Midila centralis Munroe, 1970
- Midila crenulimargo Munroe, 1970
- Midila daphne (Druce, 1895)
- Midila discolor Munroe, 1970
- Midila equatorialis Munroe, 1970
- Midila fonteboalis Munroe, 1970
- Midila guianensis Munroe, 1970
- Midila lamia Munroe, 1970
- Midila larua Munroe, 1970
- Midila latipennis Munroe, 1970
- Midila leonila Lopez, 1985
- Midila martineziana Pastrana, 1960
- Midila poppaea Munroe, 1970
- Midila quadrifenestrata Herrich-Schäffer, [1858]
- Midila rommeli Lopez, 1985
- Midila soror Munroe, 1970
- Midila strix Munroe, 1970
- Midila sympatrica Munroe, 1970
- Midila thessala Munroe, 1970
- Midila trilineata Amsel, 1956
