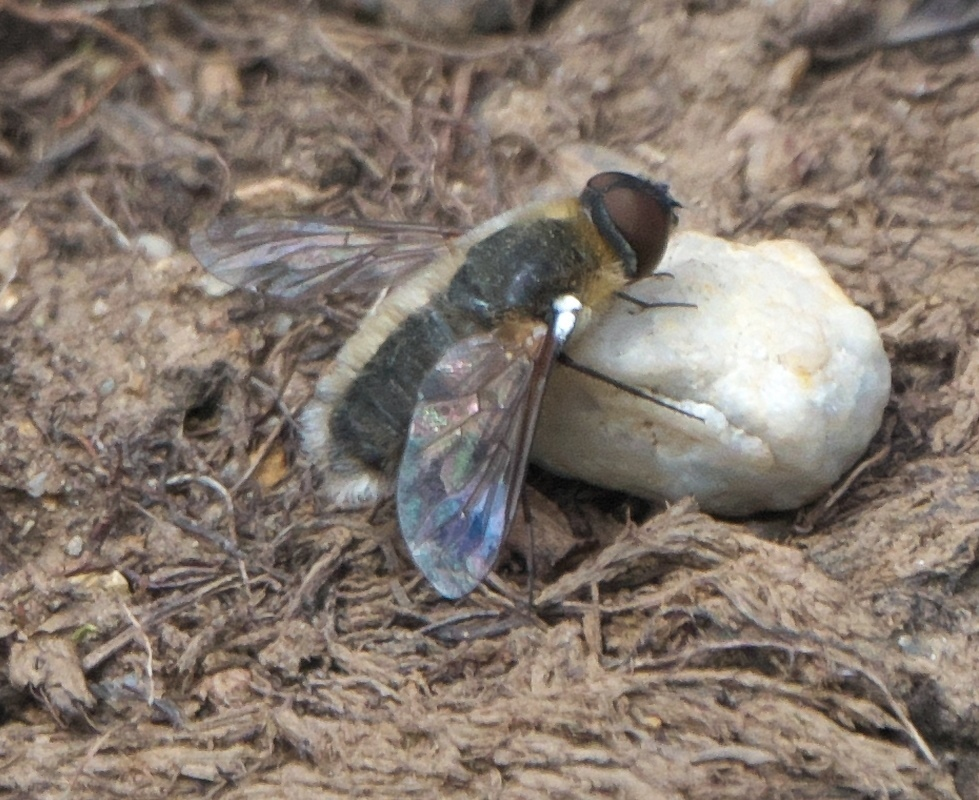
- Villa agrippina, Colorado

Scientific classification
- Kingdom: Animalia
- Phylum: Arthropoda
- Class: Insecta
- Order: Diptera
- Family: Bombyliidae
- Subfamily: Anthracinae
- Tribe: Villini
- Genus: Villa
- Species: V. agrippina

Binomial name
- Villa agrippina (Osten Sacken, 1886)

Synonyms
- Anthrax agrippina Osten Sacken, 1887

= Villa agrippina =

Species of insect

Villa agrippina is a species of bee fly in the family Bombyliidae.

== Distribution ==
United States.
