= King Agrippa =

King Agrippa may refer to:

- Agrippa (mythology), semi-mythological king of Alba Longa
- Herod Agrippa I, who killed James the son of Zebedee and imprisoned apostle Peter
- Herod Agrippa II, who listened to apostle Paul's defense

== See also ==
- Agrippa (disambiguation)
