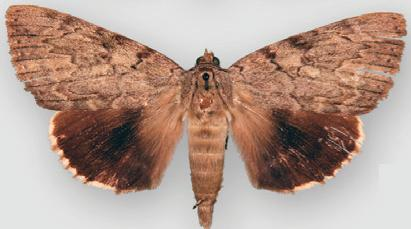

Scientific classification
- Kingdom: Animalia
- Phylum: Arthropoda
- Class: Insecta
- Order: Lepidoptera
- Superfamily: Noctuoidea
- Family: Erebidae
- Genus: Catocala
- Species: C. agrippina

Binomial name
- Catocala agrippina Strecker, 1874

Synonyms
- Catabapta agrippina; Catocala subviridis Harvey, 1877; Catocala barnesi French, 1900; Catocala barnesii

= Catocala agrippina =

Agrippina underwing

Species of moth

Catocala agrippina, the Agrippina underwing, is a moth of the family Erebidae. The species was first described by Herman Strecker in 1874. It is found in the United States from southern New Jersey south to Florida, west to Texas and eastern Oklahoma and north to southern Indiana.

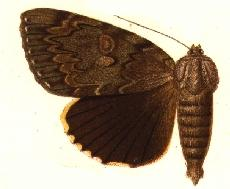
Illustration

The wingspan is 75–85 mm (3.0–3.3 in). Adults are on wing from June to August depending on the location.

The larvae feed on Carya cordiformis (bitternut hickory).
