= Agrippinus =

Agrippinus may refer to:

- Paconius Agrippinus, a stoic philosopher of the 1st century
- Agrippinus of Alexandria, bishop of Alexandria in the 2nd century
- Agrippinus of Carthage, bishop of Carthage during the 3rd century
- Agrippinus of Autun, bishop of Autun; see Germain of Paris
- Agrippinus of Naples (Agrippino, Arpinus), bishop of Naples in the 3rd century
- Agrippinus (magister militum), Roman general of the 5th century

== See also ==
- Agrippina (disambiguation), the female name of Agrippinus
