= Agrippa Masiyakurima =

Zimbabwean businessman

Agrippa “Bopela” Masiyakurima
- Born: Agrippa Masiyakurima; Mutare, Zimbabwe
- Other name: Bopela
- Occupation: Civil Engineer
- Spouse: Abigail Marongwe

Agrippa “Bopela” Masiyakurima was born in Mutare, Zimbabwe. He is well known in Zimbabwe as a businessman who runs the civil engineering firm, Bopela Group of Companies, which works in the telecommunications industry across Africa. He is regarded as a controversial businessman and political figure and was a long-term supporter of ZANUPF and the G40 faction.

== Political career ==
He actively joined politics in 2018 by running for Member of Parliament for Mutare North under the New Patriotic Front party but did not win the election. He was also a founding member of the People's Party in 2020 but was evicted from the party later that year. He is married to Abigail Marongwe. Masiyakurima has been known as a philanthropist who has helped people in Mutare with various projects. These include poultry projects that assist the poor, and athletic events for the youth.

== Awards ==
- The Class of 2015 - Under 40 Zim Business Achievers list, Ngoda Business Magazine - 2015.
