= Agrippina Shin =

Korean Uzbek politician (born 1958)

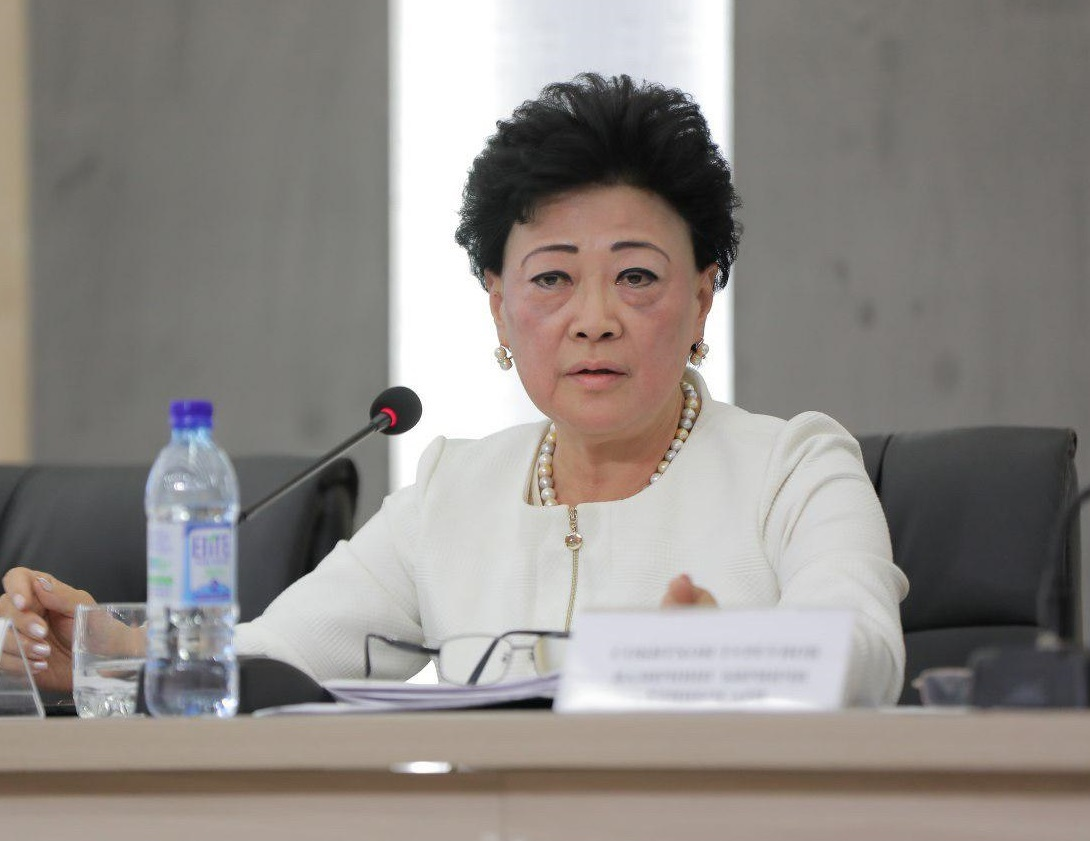

Minister of Preschool Education
- In office 19 October 2017 – 30 December 2022
- President: Shavkat Mirziyoyev
- Prime Minister: Abdulla Aripov
- Preceded by: Position established
- Succeeded by: Hilola Umarova

Personal details
- Born: December 29, 1958 (age 67) Samarqand Region, Uzbek SSR, USSR

Agrippina Vasilyevna Shin (Uzbek: Agrepina Vasilyevna Shin; Russian: Агриппина Васильевна Шин, Agrippina Vasil'yevna Shin; Korean: 아그리피나 바실리에브나 신; born December 29, 1958) is an Uzbek politician who was Uzbekistan's Minister of Preschool Education from 2017 to December 2022, when she was replaced by Hilola Umarova and appointed deputy of the latter.

== Biography ==
Shin was born on December 29, 1958, in the Samarqand Region to parents of Soviet Korean descent.

She began her career in 1980 as an engineer in the research laboratory of the Tashkent Electrotechnical Institute of Communications. From 1987 to 2017, Shin worked at the Tashkent Vocational College of Information Technologies. Until 2004, she worked at the Secondary Vocational School#4 in Tashkent. There she held positions of master of industrial training and, director and deputy director for educational and industrial work.

In 2015, she was elected to the Senate of Uzbekistan from the city of Tashkent. In the upper house of parliament, she became a member of the committees on international relations, foreign economic relations, foreign investment and tourism. On October 19, 2017, she was appointed as head of the newly created cabinet post of Ministry of Preschool Education. However, she continues to remain a member of the Senate.

== Awards ==
- Order of Friendship: rewarded to group of workers in science, education, health care, culture, art, spirituality and enlightenment, the media and other social spheres, in connection with the seventeenth anniversary of the independence of the Republic of Uzbekistan.
- Order "Mehnat shuhrati": for services in upgrading the activities of the Preschool Education Institutions, sectorial development, introducing modern technologies in education, bring up a healthy and mature generation, as well as on the occasion of her 60th birthday anniversary.
- Order of Diplomatic Service Merit, Gwanghwa Medal (South Korea): for contributions to the expansion and strengthening of friendship between Republic of Korea and Uzbekistan.

== Bibliography ==
- Shin, Agrippina (August 30, 2018). High standards in preschool education. Narodnoye Slovo newspaper. ISSN 2010-8877.
