= Dolichobela =

Scientific classification
- Domain: Eukaryota
- Kingdom: Animalia
- Phylum: Arthropoda
- Class: Insecta
- Order: Lepidoptera
- Family: Crambidae
- Genus: Dolichobela; Turner, 1932
- Species: D. celidograpta

Binomial name
- Dolichobela celidograpta Turner, 1932

Genus of moths

Dolichobela is a monotypic moth genus of the family Crambidae described by Alfred Jefferis Turner in 1932. It contains only one species, Dolichobela celidograpta, described in the same publication, which is found in Australia, where it has been recorded from Queensland.

The larvae have been recorded feeding on the fruit of Capparis mitchellii.
