= Jean-Michel Roddaz =

French academic and historian

Jean-Michel Roddaz (29 February 1948, Chambéry) is a French academic and historian, a specialist of ancient Rome, particularly of the Republican and Augustan periods.

== Biography ==
Roddaz became an agrégé d'histoire in 1972 then a doctor (Essai sur les sources du Principat augustéen under the direction of Robert Etienne, 1976). He was assistant of ancient history at the University of Pau between 1974 and 1979. He has an habilitation to direct research (Marcus Agrippa, 1984) after he was a residing member of the École française de Rome between 1979 and 1981. He was a lecturer and professor at the University of Pau from 1982 to 1988 and then became Professor of Ancient History at the Bordeaux Montaigne University in 1988.

He participated in the work Histoire Romaine, Tome I. Des Origines à Auguste (2000) under the direction of François Hinard and in collaboration with Dominique Briquel and Giovanni Brizzi, writing the last two chapters (Les chemins vers la dictature and L'héritage), from Julius Caesar's consulate in the year 59 BC to the suicides of Mark Antony and Cleopatra in 30 BC, leading the way for the Empire to Octavian, the future Augustus.

== Works ==
- 1984: Marcus Agrippa, BEFAR, n° 252, Rome, read online.
- 1991: Édition commentée des livres L-LI de l'Histoire romaine de Dion Cassius, CUF, Paris, (in collaboration with M.-L. Freyburger)
- 1993: Les Racines de l’Aquitaine, Bordeaux, (in collaboration with L. Maurin and J.-P. Bost).
- 1994: Édition commentée des livres LXVIII-XLIX de l'Histoire romaine de Dion Cassius, CUF, Paris, (in collaboration with M.-L. Freyburger)
- 2000: Histoire Romaine, Tome I. Des Origines à Auguste, Fayard, Paris, (under the direction of François Hinard ).
- 2004: Guide archéologique d’Aquitaine (in collab.), Bordeaux
- 2014: Hérode, Le roi architecte (in collaboration with J.-C. Golvin), Actes Sud, Arles
