= François Hinard =

French historian of ancient Rome (1941–2008)

Rector of the Academy of Reims
- In office 1995–1998
- Succeeded by: André Lespagnol

Personal details
- Born: 27 September 1941 Neuilly-sur-Seine, France
- Died: 19 September 2008 (aged 66) Paris, France
- Education: Faculté des lettres de Paris
- Occupation: Historian

François Hinard (27 September 1941 – 19 September 2008) was a French historian of the Roman Republic.

== Work ==
=== Books ===
- 1976: Introduction bibliographique pour l’étude de l’Antiquité (in collaboration with Georges Losfeld, pour la partie grecque), Lille
- 1985: Les proscriptions de la Rome républicaine, 605 p., École française de Rome, Coll. de l’École française n° 83
- 1985: Sylla, 327 p., Fayard — ISBN 2-213-01672-0. (Italian translation : Silla, Rome, Salerno, 1990).
- 1987: La Mort, les morts et l’au-delà dans le monde romain, 375 p., Actes du colloque, Caen (20–22 November 1985)
- 1988: Dictatures, 112 p., Actes de la table ronde, Paris, (27–28 February 1984), Paris, de Boccard
- 1992: Rome. L’espace urbain et ses représentations, 286 p., Presses universitaires de Paris-Sorbonne
- 1992: La République romaine, PUF, series Que sais-je ?
- 1995: La Mort au quotidien dans le monde romain, 257 p., Actes du colloque de la Sorbonne (7–9 October 1993), de Boccard
- 2000: Histoire romaine, Tome 1: Des origines à Auguste, (direction d’ouvrage et écriture, in collaboration with Dominique Briquel, Giovanni Brizzi and Jean-Michel Roddaz), 1075 p., Fayard — ISBN 2-213-03194-0
- 2002: « Lex Libitinaria » - L’espace civique et la mort (edition, translation and commentary of an inscription in Pouzzoles), de Boccard
- 2002: Dion Cassius, Histoire Romaine, livres 41 & 42 édition, translation & commentary, Les Belles Lettres, Coll. des Universités de France (in collaboration with P. Cordier and M.-L. Freyburger)

=== Articles ===
1. 1975: Le pro Quinctio, un discours politique ?, REA LXXVII, 88–107.
2. 1976: Remarques sur les praecones et le praeconium dans la Rome de la fin de la République, Latomus XXXV, 730–746.
3. 1979: L. Cornelius Chrysogonus et la portée politique du pro Roscio Amerino, Liverpool Classical Monthly 4, 75–76.
4. 1980: Paternus inimicus : sur une expression de Cicéron, Mélanges Wuilleumier, Paris, 197–210.
5. 1983: La proscription de 82 et les Italiens, Les Bourgeoisies municipales italiennes aux II et Ier a.C., Naples, 325–331.
6. 1984: La Naissance du mythe de Sylla, REL LXII, 81–97.
7. 1984: Sur les liberi proscriptorum. Approches prosopographique et juridique d’un problème politique, Mélanges Guarino, Naples, 1889–1907.
8. 1984: La Male Mort. Exécutions et statut du corps au moment de la première proscription, in Du Châtiment dans la cité. Supplices corporels et peine de mort dans le monde antique, Rome, École française, 295–311.
9. 1985: La déposition du consul de 88, Q. Pompeius Rufus, et la première prise de Rome par les armes, Kentron 1, 1, 3–5.
10. 1986: Mais qui donc a tué Gratidianus ?, Kentron 2, 5, 118–122.
11. 1987: Sur une autre forme de l’opposition entre uirtus et fortuna, Kentron 3, 1, 17–20.
12. 1987: Spectacle des exécutions et espace urbain, L’VRBS . Espace urbain et histoire, Rome, 111–125.
13. 1987: Cicéron et Norbanus, Kentron 3, 3, 87–92.
14. 1988: De La Dictature à la tyrannie. Réflexions sur la dictature de Sylla, Dictatures, Paris, de Boccard, 87–96.
15. 1989: Marius, Sylla et l’Afrique ", VIo colloquio L’Africa Romana, Sassari, 81-88.
16. 1990: Solidarités familiales et ruptures à l’époque des guerres civiles, Table ronde Parentés et stratégies dans l’Antiquité romaine, Rome, École française, 555-570.
17. 1990: M. Terentius Varro Lucullus, fils du consul de 73 a.C., Latomus 49, 2, 421-424.
18. 1990: Les révoltes militaires dans l’armée romaine républicaine, BAGB, 2, 149-154.
19. 1990: Les partis pris politiques du jeune Horace, Kentron 6, 5, 103-113.
20. 1991: Philologie, prosopographie et histoire : à propos de L. Fabius Hispaniensis, Historia 40, 113-119.
21. 1991: De la République à l’Empire : révolution et restauration, Colloque L’Idée de révolution (23 September 1989), Cahiers de Fontenay-Saint-Cloud 63-64, 71-80.
22. 1991: La militarisation de l’Afrique romaine, Antiquités africaines 27, 33-38.
23. 1992: C. Sosius et le temple d’Apollon, Kentron 8, 2, 57–72.
24. 1992: « Aulu Gelle et le serment » - Au Miroir de la culture antique, Mélanges René Marache, Rennes, 287–301.
25. 1993: Sacramentum, Athenaeum 81, 251–263.
26. 1993: Le legs de la cité antique, Revue des sciences morales & politiques 2, 195–228
27. 1993: Pax Romana. Naissance et signification, Les Fondements de la Paix, P. Chaunu ed., Paris, 63–78.
28. 1994: L’élargissement du pomerium. L’Italie et l’espace urbain de Rome, La ciutat en el mondo romàno, Tarragona, 2 vols in 4°, 233–237 (XIV Congreso Internacional de Arqueologia Clásica, Tarragona, 1993).
29. 1995: La dittatura costituente di Silla, Seminari di storia e di diritto, a cura di A. Calore, Milan, Giuffrè, 1-10.
30. 1995: Confiscation et consécration des biens, Index 23, 405–411.
31. 1995: La « Loi de Pouzzoles » et les pompes funèbres, La Mort au quotidien dans le monde romain, Actes du colloque de la Sorbonne (7–9 October 1993), Paris, de Boccard, 205–212.
32. 1997: L’Europe gréco-romaine, Histoire des Populations de l’Europe, J.-P. Bardet & J. Dupâquier edd., Paris, Fayard, 93–132 (in coll. with P. Salmon & J.-N. Corvisier).
33. 1999: Vibius Pansa ou Caetronius ?, Mnemosyne 52, 202–206.
34. 1999: Dion Cassius et l’abdication de Sylla, REA, 101, 3–4, 427–432.
35. 2000: À Rome, pendant la guerre de Sicile (264–241 a.C.), RSA, 1-17
36. Rome des origines à la fin de la République, in Revue Historique I.1. CCLXXVII, 1, 1987, 121–166 (561, January–March 1987)
37. Rome des origines à la fin de la République, in Revue Historique I.2. CCLXXIX, 1, 1988, 129–180
38. Rome des origines à la fin de la République, in Revue Historique II.1. 603, July–September 1997, 115–135
39. Rome des origines à la fin de la République, in Revue Historique II.2. 606, April–July 1998, 409-440
40. Rome des origines à la fin de la République, in Revue Historique 607, July–September 1998, 617-642
41. Rome des origines à la fin de la République, in Revue Historique II.3. 612, October–December 1999, 833-858
- Plus de cent comptes rendus dans des revues françaises et étrangères
- 2002: Histoire de Rome.II : D’Auguste à la fin de l’Empire, Paris, Fayard, (direction d’ouvrage in collaboration with Yann Le Bohec & Carmen Castillo).
