= Tor Lian =

His Excellency Tor Lian

2nd Honorary President of European Handball Federation
- In office 22 June 2012 – 17 June 2016
- President: Jean Brihault (France)
- Vice President: Arne Elovsson (Sweden)
- Preceded by: Staffan Holmqvist (Sweden)
- Succeeded by: Jean Brihault (France)

2nd President of European Handball Federation
- In office 18 December 2004 – 22 June 2012
- Vice President: Jean Brihault (France)
- Preceded by: Staffan Holmqvist (Sweden)
- Succeeded by: Jean Brihault (France)

11th President of Norwegian Handball Federation
- In office 1985–1999
- Preceded by: Thorleif Gange
- Succeeded by: Karl-Arne Johannessen

Personal details
- Born: 13 June 1945 Trondheim (Kingdom of Norway)
- Died: 17 June 2016 (aged 71) Oslo (Kingdom of Norway)
- Profession: Sports Administrator

Tor Lian (13 June 1945 – 14 July 2016) was a Norwegian sports official.

Lian was the president of the Norwegian Handball Federation from 1985 to 1999 and the European Handball Federation from 2004 to 2012. He was the vice president of the Norwegian Olympic Committee from 1990 to 1996 and board member of the Norwegian Confederation of Sports from 1991 to 1996. He became an honorary member of the Norwegian Confederation of Sports in 2010. He died in July 2016.

Sporting positions
Preceded by Staffan Holmqvist	President of the European Handball Federation; 2004-2012	Succeeded by Jean Brihault
