= Bernard Bonnejean =

French author (born 1950)

Bernard Bonnejean (born 10 June 1950 in Ernée, Mayenne), is a French author, specialist of catholic French poetry of 19th and 20th centuries.

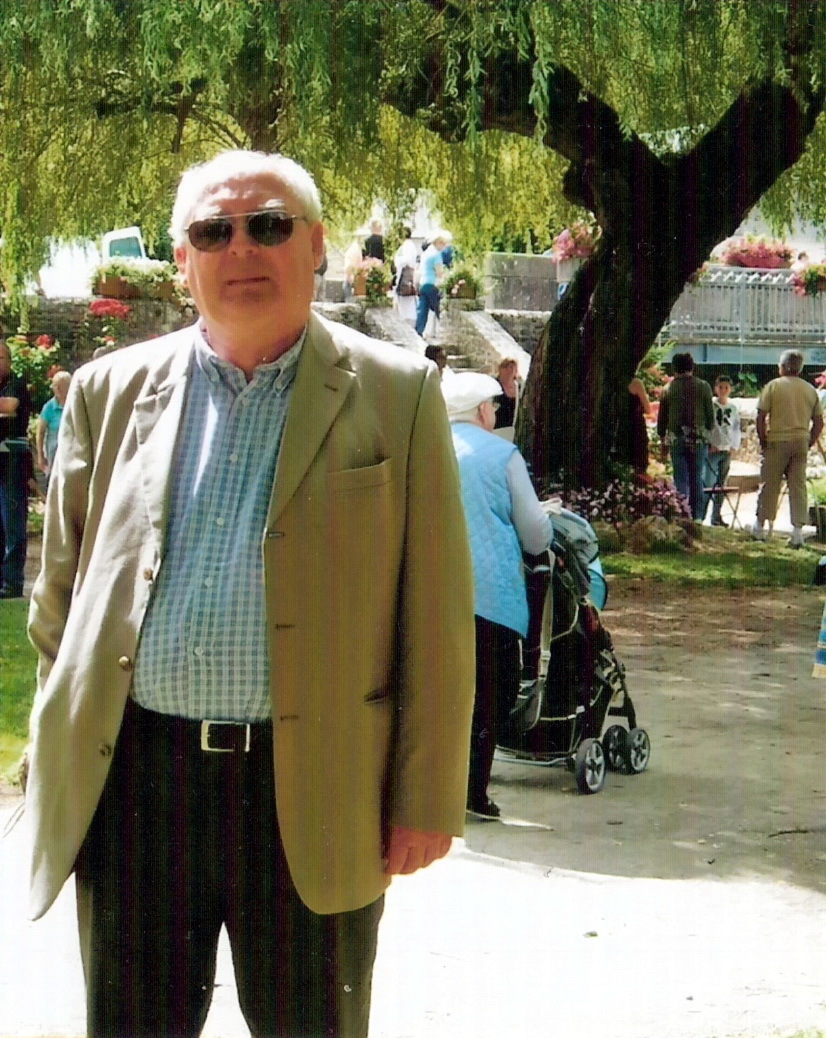
Bernard Bonnejean : Feast of artists and poets (Chailland-Mayenne-France), in April 2010

== Youth ==
Bernard Bonnejean is the last of eight children of a family of Picardy’s origin. In 1959 the family moved to Le Mans where the father, Maurice, is ironsmith to Arsenal, then clerk after retirement. The family settled in 1965 in Mayenne.

== Professorship ==
After earning his baccalauréat, Bernard Bonnejean works as a teacher and middle school professor in Catholic education. He's licencié es Lettres, Bachelor of Arts, and certified teacher of modern literature, in Saint-Pierre-la-Cour. He finished his career as a teacher in a secondary school in Laval, Mayenne as an Agrégé de Lettres modernes. He earned the title of Doctor after leaving education.

He was secretary of the Association Mayennaise d’échanges et de partage (AMEP) from 1975 to 2001, to finance the apprenticeship of young Cameroonian mothers, founder and president of the Association Lycée en Poésie.

== Writer and researcher ==
Bernard Bonnejean expressed in 1996 about the true catholicism of Paul Verlaine. Particularly, he examines the work of catholic Joris-Karl Huysmans and poetry of Therese of Lisieux. His thesis entitled Les Poètes catholiques français de Verlaine à Péguy, 1870-1914 (The French-Catholics Poets from Verlaine to Péguy, 1870-1914), is sustained in 2003 in the University of Rennes 2 - Upper Brittany.

== Works and articles ==
• “Liturgies intimes, un recueil à redécouvrir”, ("Liturgies intimes, a collection to rediscover"), in Spiritualité verlainienne, Actes du colloque international de Metz (novembre 1996), (Proceedings of International Symposium of Metz Metz (November 1996), Klincksieck, 1997 (ISBN 2-252-03171-9).

• "Le Verlaine de Guy Goffette", in Revue Verlaine n° 5, 1997.

• "Huysmans avant À Rebours : les fondements nécessaires d'une quête en devenir", in Le Mal dans l'imaginaire français (1850–1950), éd. David et L'Harmattan, 1998 (ISBN 2-7384-6198-0); "Huysmans before A Rebours: The necessary foundation for a quest to become", The evil in the French imaginary (1850–1950), Ed. David and L'Harmattan, 1998 (ISBN 2-7384-6198-0)

• Les Poètes français d'inspiration catholique (1870–1914), The French inspired Catholic poets (1870–1914), 2 vol., (695p.), thèse de doctorat, Université de Rennes-II, 2003; Lille : Atelier national de reproduction des thèses, 2004.

• Poésie thérésienne, (Poetry of Therese), Preface Constant Tonnelier, Éditions du Cerf, Paris, 2006, II-292 p., (ISBN 978-2-204-07785-9), (FRBNF 40238743k).

The thesis is published in three volumes

• Clio et ses poètes, Clio and her poets : the Catholic poets in history, 1870-1914, with a foreword by Don Bertrand Gamelin, Éditions du Cerf, Paris, 2007, 354 p., (ISBN 978-2-204-08052-1)

• Le Dur Métier d’apôtre, The hard work of Apostle : Catholic poets to discover a real authenticity, 1870-1914, with a preface by Olivier Bourdelier, Éditions du Cerf, Paris, 2009, 320 p., (ISBN 978-2-204-08053-8), (FRBNF 42011100g).

• Les Chemins d'un Éden retrouvé, Paths of Paradise Found, Forthcoming.
