= Françoise Briquel-Chatonnet =

French historian, research director

- Born: Françoise Chatonnet; 22 August 1956 (age 70); Lyon, France
- Education: University Panthéon-Sorbonne
- Occupations: Historian, research director
- Known for: Irène-Joliot-Curie Prize
- Spouse: Dominique Briquel

Françoise Briquel-Chatonnet (born 1956) is a French historian and research director. She is a doctor in history, research director at the CNRS, at the Orient and Mediterranean laboratory and a member of the Académie des inscriptions et belles-lettres. In 2016, she was awarded the Irène-Joliot-Curie Prize for Woman Scientist of the Year.

== Biography ==
Françoise Briquel-Chatonnet, was born on 22 August 1956 in Lyon, France. From 1975 to 1980, she attended the Ecole Normale Supérieure for young girls, and earned her Agrégation in history in 1978. She completed her doctorate from the University Panthéon-Sorbonne with a thesis on relations between cities of the Phoenician Coast and the Kingdoms of Israel and Judah (1988) and qualified to direct research from the François-Rabelais University in Tours (1999).

=== Career ===
She was a resident at the National Library of France, Oriental Manuscripts Division (1981-1985), where she notably worked on the first volume of the catalog of Syriac manuscripts. In 2020, she became director of research at the CNRS (“Semitic Worlds” component) and deputy director of the “Orient and Mediterranean” laboratory (UMR 8167).

In 2016 she received the Irène-Joliot-Curie Prize for Woman Scientist of the Year for 'her research on the history of the Levant in the 1st millennium BC and the culture of Christians in the Near East, particularly through written objects, manuscripts and inscriptions."

She was elected a member of the French Academy of Inscriptions and Belles-Lettres on 21 May 2021.

=== Memberships ===
At CNRS, Briquel-Chatonnet has served as a member of the CNRS national committee, section 32, (2004-2008) and of the scientific council of the Institute of Human and Social Sciences of the CNRS (2010-2014). She is also on the school's scientific council for Ecole Pratique des Hautes Etudes (2018-2021).

Briquel-Chatonnet is founder and President of the Society for Syriac Studies (Paris); member of the Asian Society (Paris), member of the Society for the Study of the Prehistoric, member of Ancient and Medieval Maghreb (Paris), member of the Society of Professors of Ancient History.

=== Personal life ===
Briquel-Chatonnet married philologist and etruscologist Dominique Briquel.

== Distinctions ==
- Prize from the Thiers Foundation for the publication of her doctoral thesis, 1988
- CNRS bronze medal, 1993
- Irène-Joliot-Curie Prize for Woman Scientist of the Year, 2016
- Member of the Académie des inscriptions et belles-lettres since 2021
- Knight of the National Order of Merit
- Knight of the Academic Palms

== Selected publications ==
- Françoise Briquel-Chatonnet, The Syriac World, Paris, Les Belles Lettres, 2017, 272 p. ( ISBN 978-2-251-44715-5 )
- Relations between the cities of the Phoenician coast and the kingdoms of Israel and Judah, Studia Phœnicia 12, Orientalia Lovaniensia Analecta 46, Louvain, Librairie orientaliste Peeters, 1992, 446 p.
- Syriac Manuscripts. National Library of France (manuscripts entered since 1911, no.356-435). Aix-en-Provence, Méjanes Library. Lyon, Municipal Library. Strasbourg, National and University Library. Catalog, Paris, National Library of France, 1997, 264 p.
- with Éric Gubel, Les Phéniciens : Aux origines du Liban, Gallimard, collection « Découvertes Gallimard / Archéologie » (nº 358), 1998, 160 p.
- with Pierre Bordreuil, Le Temps de la Bible, Paris, Gallimard, coll. “History Folio”, 2003, 461 p.
- Editing of the collective work La Bible, Paris, Jules Tallandier, 2003, 345 p.
- The Arameans and the first Arabs, Aix-en-Provence, Édisud, 2005 (Encyclopedia of the Mediterranean)
- Christian Arabia (with Christian Julien Robin), Paris, Les Belles Lettres, 2017
