= Rennes 2 University =

University in Brittany, France

Coordinates: 48.119°N 1.703°W

- Université Rennes-II Haute-Bretagne
- Other name: Université Rennes 2
- Type: Public
- Established: 1969
- Endowment: €106,000,000
- President: Vincent Gouëset
- Faculty: 645
- Administrative staff: 1,095
- Students: 21,445
- Undergraduates: 14,145
- Postgraduates: 5,183
- Doctoral students: 478
- Location: Rennes, Brittany, France
- Campus: Urban
- Nickname: "Rennes 2 la Rouge"
- Website: www.univ-rennes2.fr

Rennes 2 University (UR2; French: Université Rennes 2, officially Université Rennes-II Haute-Bretagne; Breton: Skol-veur Roazhon 2) is a public university located in Upper Brittany, France. It is one of the four universities of the Academy of Rennes. The main campus is situated in the northwest of Rennes in the Villejean neighborhood, not far from the other campus, at La Harpe.

== History ==
=== Creation of the University of Brittany ===
At the request of Francis II, Duke of Brittany, the Pope created the first University of Brittany in Nantes in 1460. It taught arts, medicine, law, and theology. In 1728, the mayor of Nantes, Gérard Mellier, asked that the university be moved to Rennes, Nantes being a more trade oriented city. The law school was relocated to Rennes in 1730. The latter city was already home to the Parliament of Brittany, and therefore was considered better suited to host an academic institution. In 1793 the national government closed all universities in France. It was not until 1806 that the law school reopened in Rennes.

=== Development of the faculties in Rennes ===
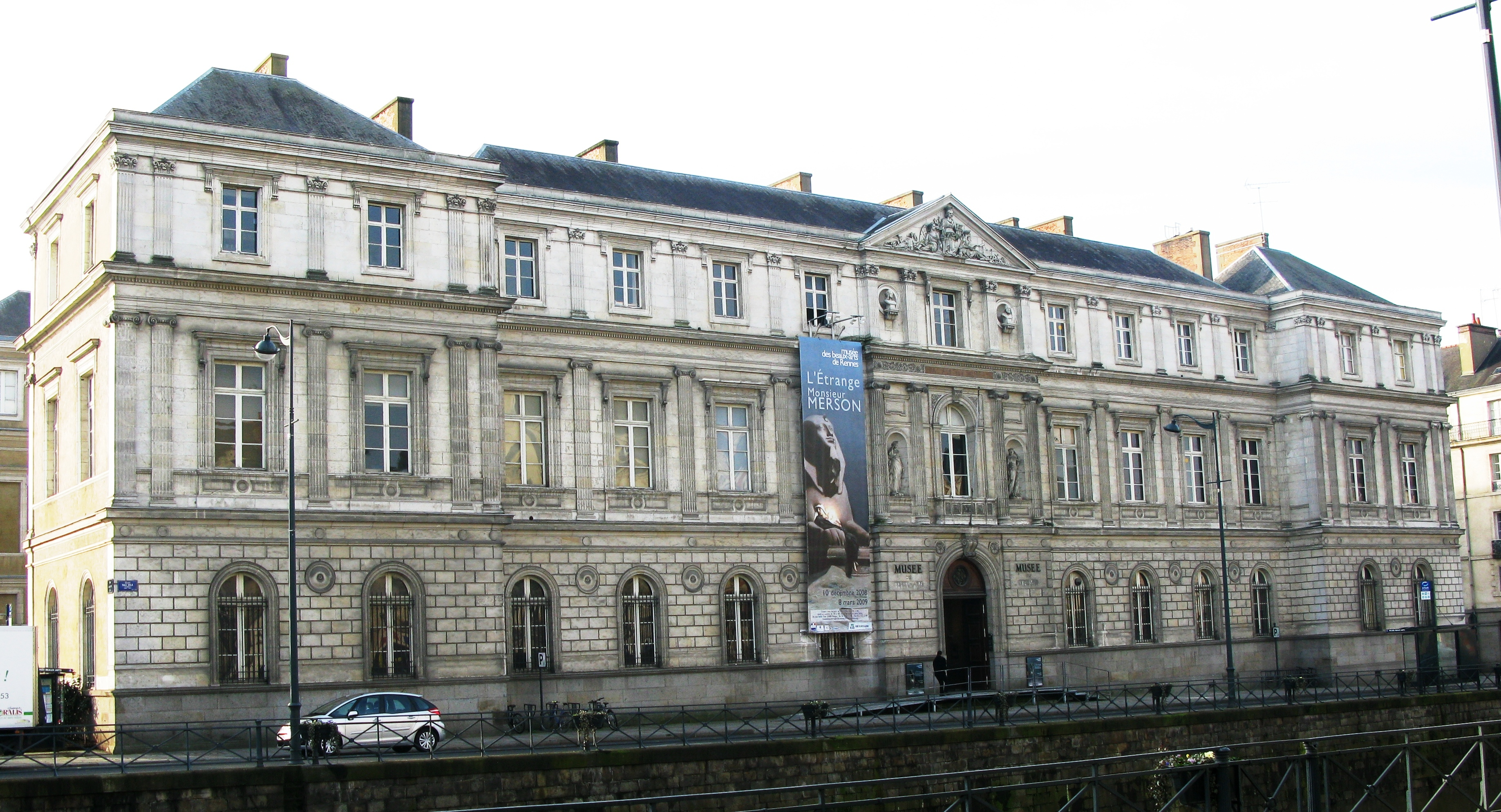
Former Palais Universitaire of the University of Rennes, currently Municipal Museum of Fine Arts

In 1808, Napoleon I reorganized the French university system, creating the University of France. Of the University of Brittany's two original sites, only Rennes was included in this organization. Nantes had to wait until 1970 for its university to be re-established. In 1810 a faculty of letters opened, which in 1835 consisted of five schools (French literature, foreign literature, ancient literature, history, and philosophy). The science faculty in Rennes opened in 1840. There were no clear boundaries between the three faculties until 1885 with the creation of a "Conseil des facultés", which in 1896 took the name of University of Rennes. In the middle of the 19th century, these were situated in the Palais Universitaire, located currently in the Quai Émile Zola, but were then scattered throughout the city. The Faculty of Letters was thus relocated in 1909 to the Séminaire, currently in the Place Hoche.

=== Creation of Rennes 2 University ===
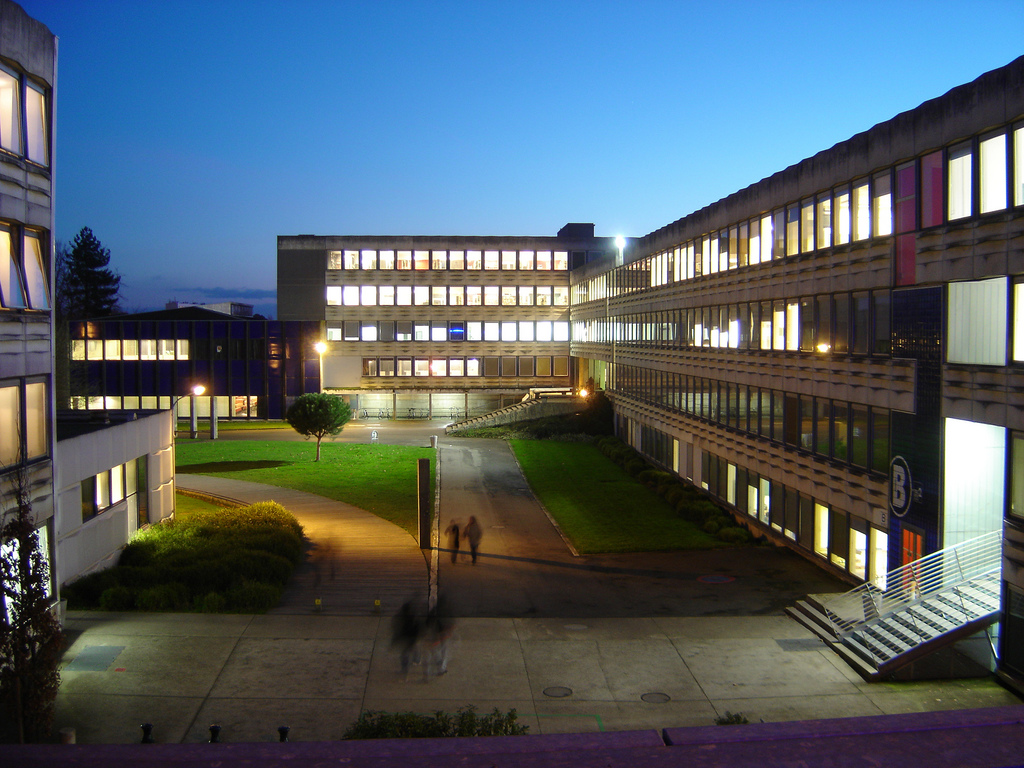
inside the campus, view on the ALC and Human Sciences buildings

In 1967, the Villejean campus opened, dedicated to arts, letters, and human sciences.

In 1969, legislation was passed to promote the growth of French universities, which had the effect of splitting the University of Rennes into two new entities. This new university assumed the name of 'University of Upper Brittany'. The Villejean neighborhood was then still in development; housing for students and other university facilities had to be built.

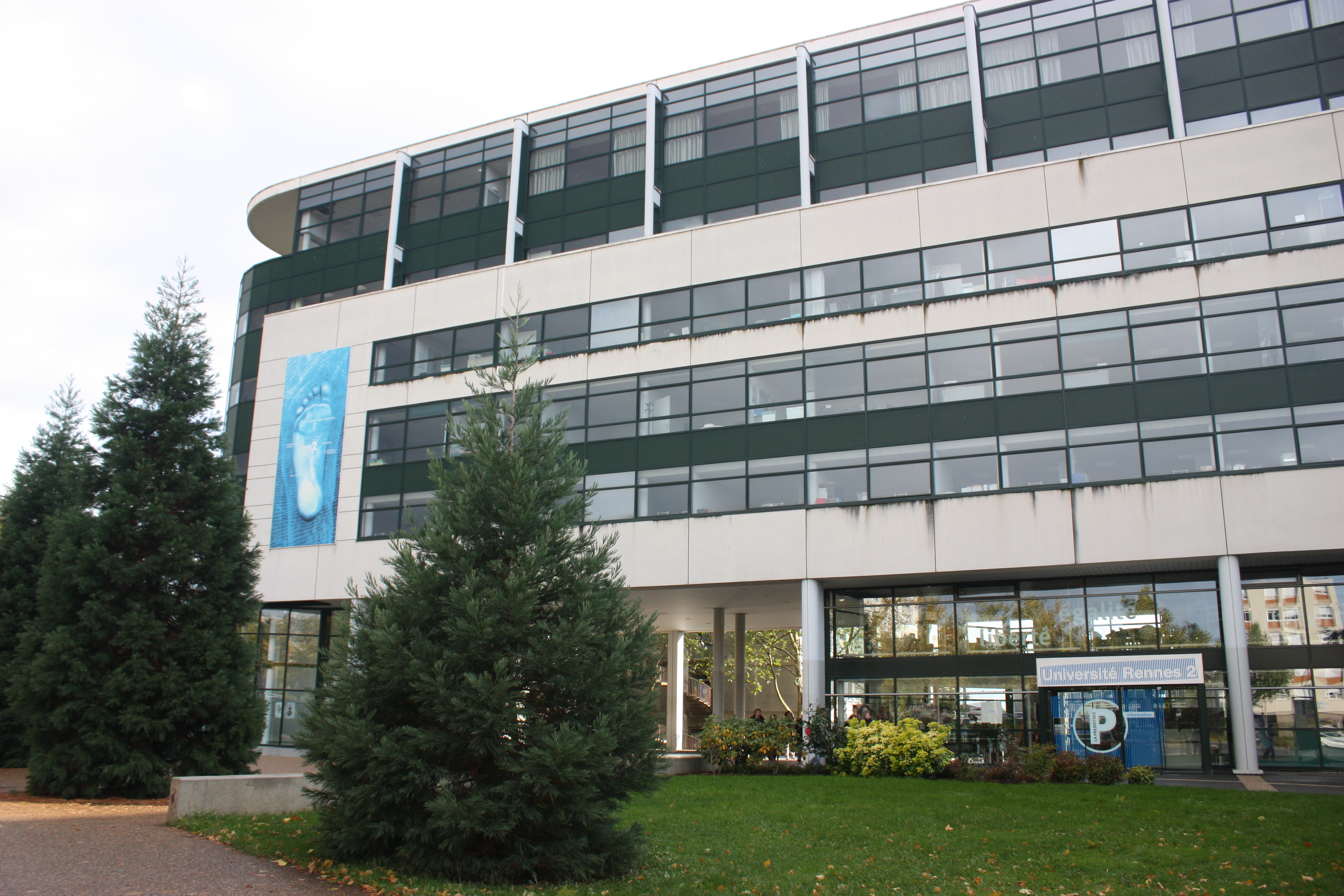

In the east of the city, the Beaulieu quarter hosts the departments of sciences and philosophy. In the west, Villejean is home to the Schools of Foreign Languages, Arts, Human Sciences and Social Sciences. The University of Rennes 1 School of Medicine is located on the edge of Villejean campus, and is also based in Brittany's largest hospital center, Pontchaillou.

=== 21st century ===
Since March 2002, the Villejean campus has been accessible by the VAL subway, via 'Villejean-Université' station, reducing the travel time between the inner city and the to only 5 minutes.

In 2015, the 12,000-capacity indoor athletics venue Robert-Poirier Stadium was opened on the Villejean campus.

On 1 January 2023, Rennes 1 University merged with five grandes écoles: EHESP, École nationale supérieure de chimie de Rennes, ENS Rennes, INSA Rennes and Sciences-Po Rennes to create the new University of Rennes. The University of Rennes 2, along with other research institutes (CNRS, INRAE, Inria, Inserm and CHU de Rennes), are associated with the 'UNIR' project. The six establishments will be grouped together in an 'Experimental Public Establishment' (EPE), with nearly 7,000 staff and teachers, including a thousand researchers, 156 research laboratories and 60,000 of the 68,000 students in the Breton capital, among them 7,000 international students.

=== List of presidents ===
Presidents of Rennes 2 University
Years	Name
2023–	Vincent Gouëset
2021–2023	Christine Rivalan-Guégo
2015–2021	Olivier David
2006–2010	Marc Gontard
2001–2006	François Mouret
1996–2001	Jean Brihault
1991–1996	André Lespagnol
1986–1991	Jean Mounier
1982–1986	Jean François Botrel
1976–1980	Michel Denis

== Academic programs ==
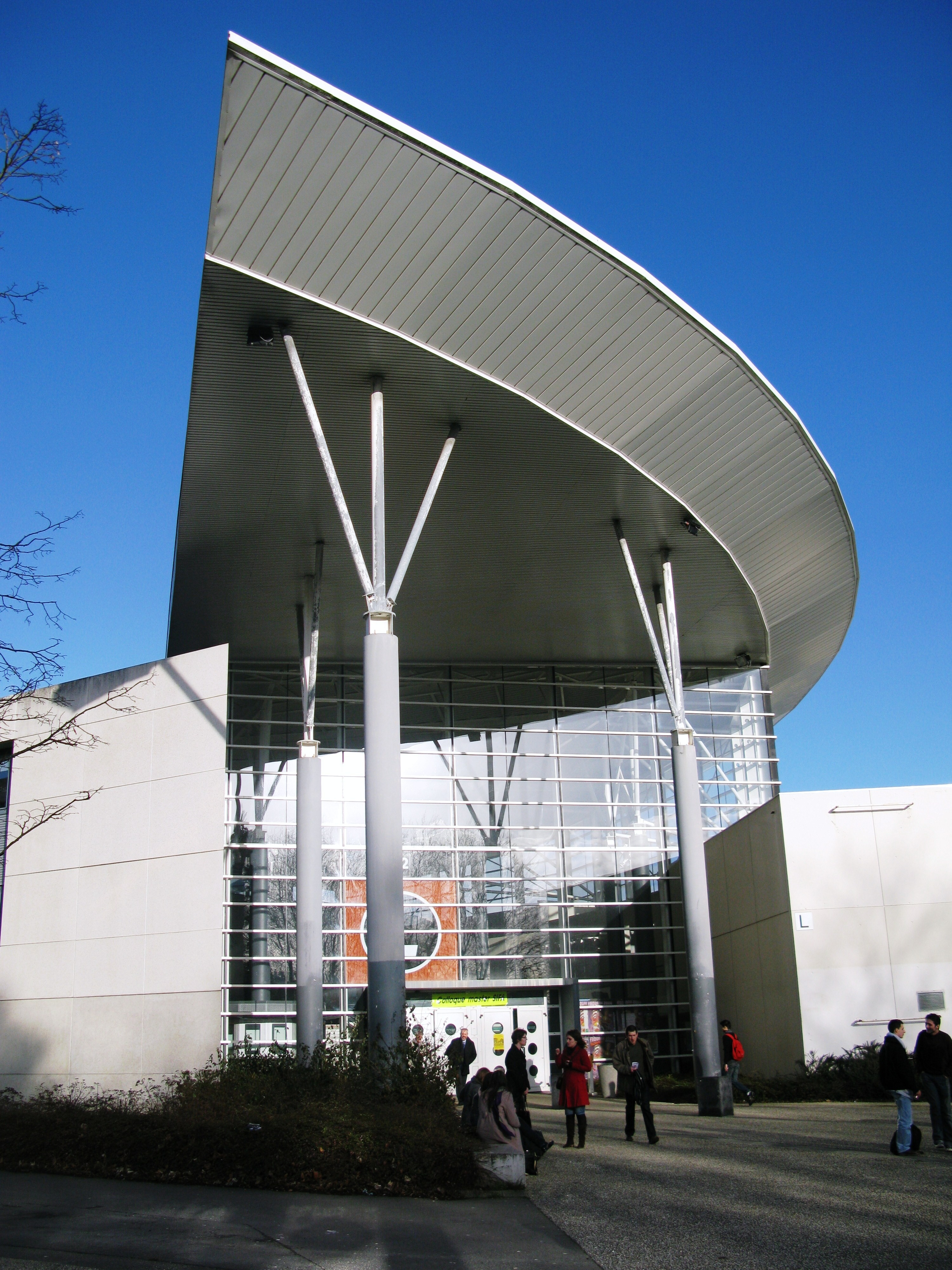
Entrance to the département of foreign languages

The university is structured around 5 UFRs, or teaching and research units. This UFR-based organization is common to all public universities in France.

- The UFR of Sports (APS):
  - 1 department: STAPS
  - 1 research unit
- The UFR of Arts, Letters, Communication (ALC):
  - 5 departments (Plastic arts, Performing arts, History of art, Literature, and Music)
  - 4 research units
- The UFR of Foreign Languages:
  - 11 departments: German, English, Arabic, Breton and Celtic languages, Chinese, Spanish, Italian, LEA (Applied Foreign Languages, students study 2 languages and a few courses in economics), Multilingualism, Portuguese and Russian. 21 different foreign languages are currently taught in these departements, from beginner to advanced level
  - 4 research units, including one belonging to the CNRS
  - 1 center for non-student teaching: Le Centre de Langues
  - 1 institute: L'Institut des Amériques de Rennes (IDA), the American Studies institute
- The UFR of Human Science:
  - 3 departments: Psychology / Teaching Sciences / Sociology, Language, and Communication
  - 4 research units
  - 1 training center: Cefocop
  - 1 institute: Institut de criminologie et Sciences Humaines (ICSH)
- The UFR of Social sciences:
  - 4 departments: Administration économique et sociale (AES), Geography and Spatial Planning, History, and Mathematics applied to Social Sciences (MASS)
  - 6 research units, including 5 belonging to the CNRS
  - 2 institutes: L'Institut des Amériques de Rennes (IDA), the American Studies institut, and the "Institut de formation et de recherche sur l'administration territoriale" (IFRAT)

== Campus life ==
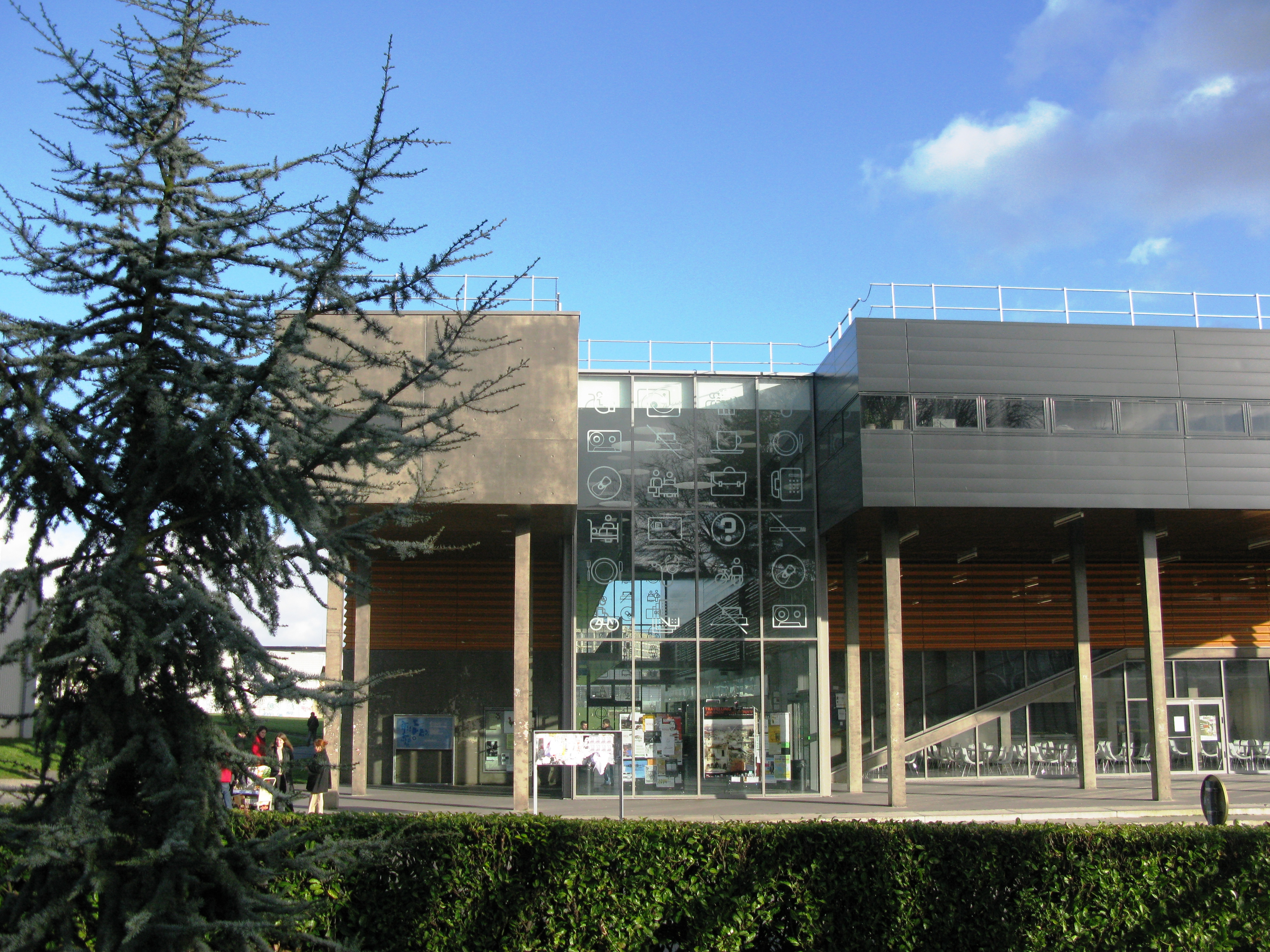
The EREVE building houses most unions as well as the book shop, information desk, banking and health services, and dining locations

=== Student organizations ===
With its 50 or so student societies, Rennes 2 University has the highest rate of organizations per student among French universities. There is a radio station, Radio Campus Rennes, for which the EREVE was built in 2005. Most of the organizations are located throughout different buildings on campus.

=== Festivals ===
Several festivals are organized by the students, some of which have been successful enough to establish themselves in the rest of the city. Among them are:

- "K-barré", focusing on performing arts
- "Roulements de tambour", focusing on music
- "Travelling", focusing on cinema, now a Citywide festival
- "Tubas d'or", focusing on short movies

== People ==
=== Alumni ===
- Louis Le Pensec (1937), Minister of Agriculture, Senator, Member of Parlement
- Marylise Lebranchu, Minister of Justice
- Jean-Yves Le Drian, Minister of Defense
- Bernard Bonnejean (1950), writer
- Étienne Daho (1956), singer
- Christophe Honoré (1970), film and theatre director, writer
- Regis Le Bris (1975), football manager and former footballer

=== Faculty ===
- Anne F. Garréta (1962), writer, prix Médicis 2002
- Jean Delumeau (1923), historian, elected to the Académie française, 27 September 1989
- Dominique Fernandez (1929), writer, prix Médicis 1974, Prix Goncourt 1982, elected to the Académie française, 8 March 2007
- Henri Fréville, Senator, Member of Parlement, Mayor of Rennes
- Milan Kundera (1929), writer, prix Médicis 1973
- Jean-Yves Le Drian (1947), Member of Parlement, Governor of the Brittany Region
- Jean-Claude Maleval, writer, psychoanalyst, professor of psychopathology
- Robert Merle (1908), writer, prix Goncourt 1949
- Juan José Saer (1937), writer, Premio Nadal 1986
- Mário Soares (1924), President of Portugal

== See also ==
- List of public universities in France by academy
