= Robert-Poirier Stadium =

Stadium in Rennes, France

stade Robert-Poirier
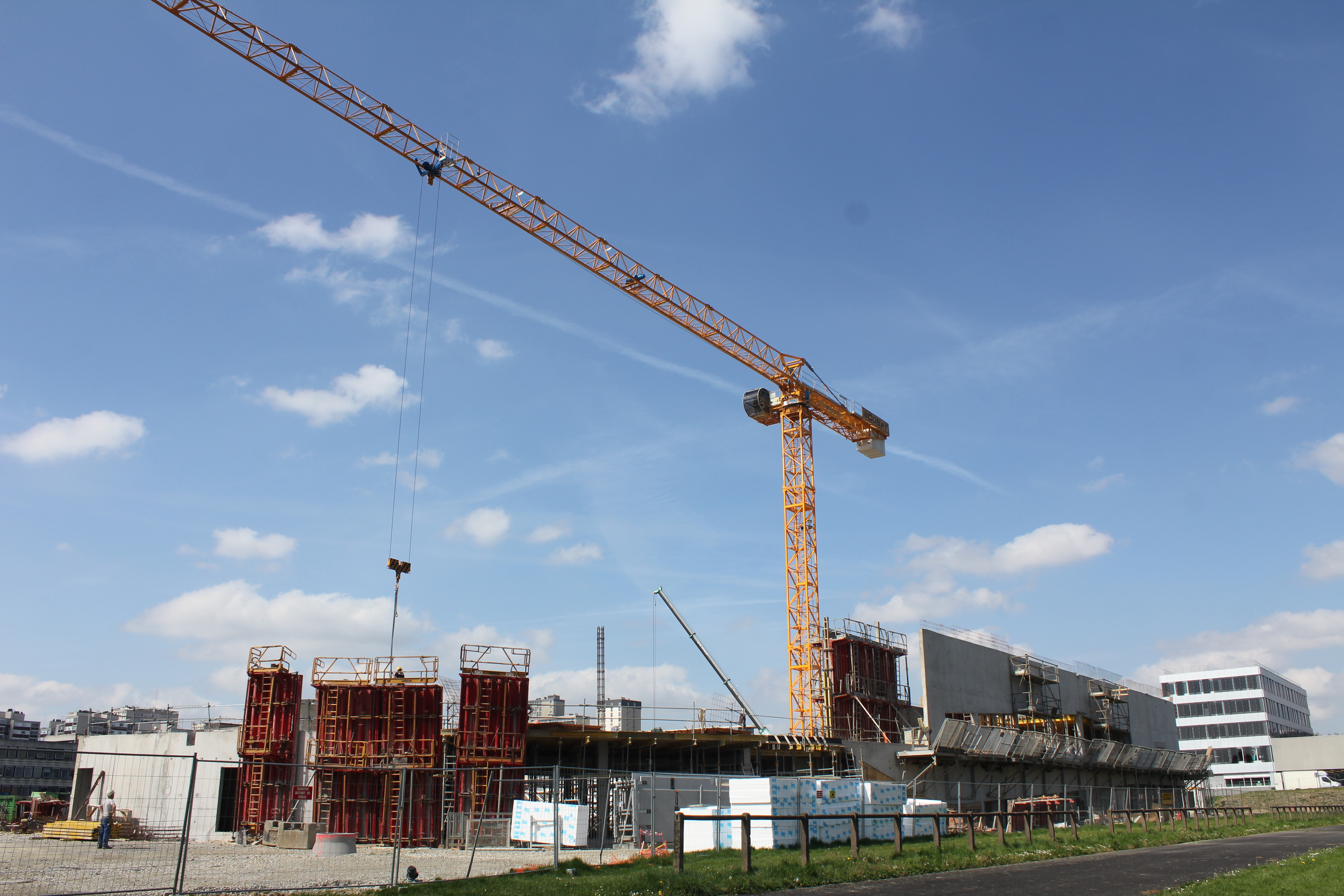
- Le stadium being constructed in March 2014

- Location within France
- Coordinates: 48.118°N 1.699°W
- Capacity: 1200, 734 seated

Construction
- Built: 2014-2015

The Robert Poirier Stadium, or Villejean Athletics Stadium, is an indoor athletics stadium, inaugurated on 5 July 2015 on the Villejean Campus at the University of Rennes. It is designed to develop sport excellence on campus. It is dependent on the University of Rennes 2 for resources. It accommodates 1200 spectators, including 734 seated.

The stadium originated during the development of the Campus de Ker Lann during the 1990s. Several covered multi-sport stadiums were planned there, but they were abandoned due to lack of funding. Only with the development of the Campus for Sport Excellence in Bretagne at the beginning of the 2010s did the project begin to be realized.

== History ==
=== First projects ===
The creation of the Campus de Ker Lann at Bruz, in the suburbs of Rennes, by the General Council of Ille-et-Vilaine in the 1990s was to include a multi-sports complex at a cost of €65 million to be paid for mainly by the Department of Ille-de-Vilaine. This was discussed in 1993 but did not come to pass. The majority of the right from the General Council supported the development of the campus, while the majority from the left at Rennes (and some of the local academics) were against it, preventing its realization.

The project was revived when the socialist Jean-Louis Tourenne became head of the General Council of Ille-et-Vilaine following the 2004 cantonal elections. The opening of the complex on the Campus de Ker Lann was scheduled for 2008. The €45 million cost of the building was to be borne entirely by the General Council But budget cuts following the 2008 financial crisis jeopardized the project.

=== Project recovery ===
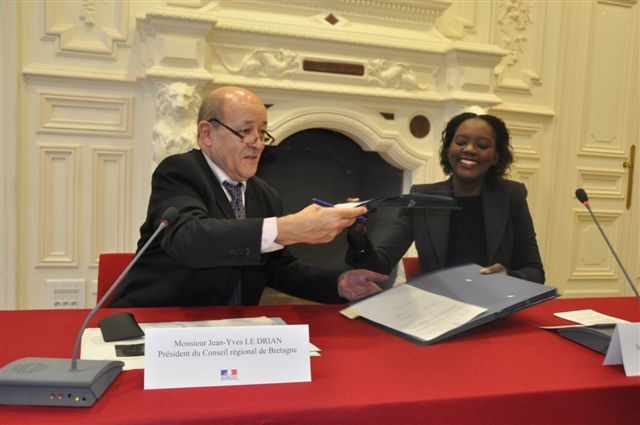
Signature de la convention entre Jean-Yves Le Drian et Rama Yade.

The project financing was resolved on 31 March 2008 when an agreement between Brittany and the state was reached for project funding, (Note: The funding comes from an investment by the region in four major sports facilities, including the Lanester Velodrome Stadium, a covered athletics stadium in Saint Brieuc, and a sports and sports hall in Brest.) bringing respectively €5 and €4 million. At the time, it was still the intention to locate the building on the Campus de Ker Lann.

At the same time, CREPS Dinard saw its existence threatened from 2008 and a closure was planned for 2010. A backup plan was then mounted by including the University Rennes 2 in creating a campus for sporting excellence in Brittany. This project was approved on 27 October 2009 and the agreement was signed in Rennes on 29 January 2010 in the presence of regional president Jean-Yves Le Drian and Secretary of State for Sport Rama Yade. The agreement then said that a stadium whose activities would be limited to athletics would be located at Rennes on the Villejean Campus near the Sports Education Building at the university.

=== Production ===
Financing was set at €12 million. The project was supported by the Department with €5.5 million, the Region with €3 million, and the State to the tune of €2 million. Rennes paid €1.5 million. A draft of the project was presented to sports bodies at the end of June 2011, and the choice of Villejean Campus was confirmed.

An architectural competition was launched in June 2011 by the General Council of Ille-et-Vilaine, and the winning project was presented by the architectural firm Chabanne and Partners on 1 July 2012. Work began in early 2014 with a ceremony of the laying of the first stone on 16 February 2014. It was decided that the stadium would be named after Robert Poirier, the former bronze medalist at the 1966 European Athletics Championships in the 400 meters hurdles, and former national technical director of French athletics.

== Infrastructure ==
=== Location ===
The stadium is located on the Villejean Campus, northwest of Rennes, in the Villejean-Beauregard area. It is located close to the Villejean-University metro station on the Rennes metro, and close to the University Hospital of Pontchaillou.

=== Architecture ===
The building was designed by the architectural from Chabanne and Partners. It has a surface of 5,830m^{2}. According to the firm, the look of the building evokes the hard work of sports in general. "The taut lines of the building symbolize the muscular effort of the athletes. The painting there is also a nod to the discipline of the athletes. It uses the colors gold, silver and bronze to symbolize the colors of the medals that the athletes compete for. " .

The complex is equipped with a 200m track for running and six 60m sprint lanes. For other athletic disciplines, there are areas for shot-put, for the long jump, and for the triple jump. Areas for the high jump and pole vaulting are planned.

The stadium's capacity is 1,293 places including 793 seated and 500 standing, with the possibility of adding 1,439 more people using mobile bleachers. One of the stands bears the name of John Huitorel, former director of the normal school at Rennes.
