= Jean Brihault =

French academic

His Excellency Dr. Jean Brihault
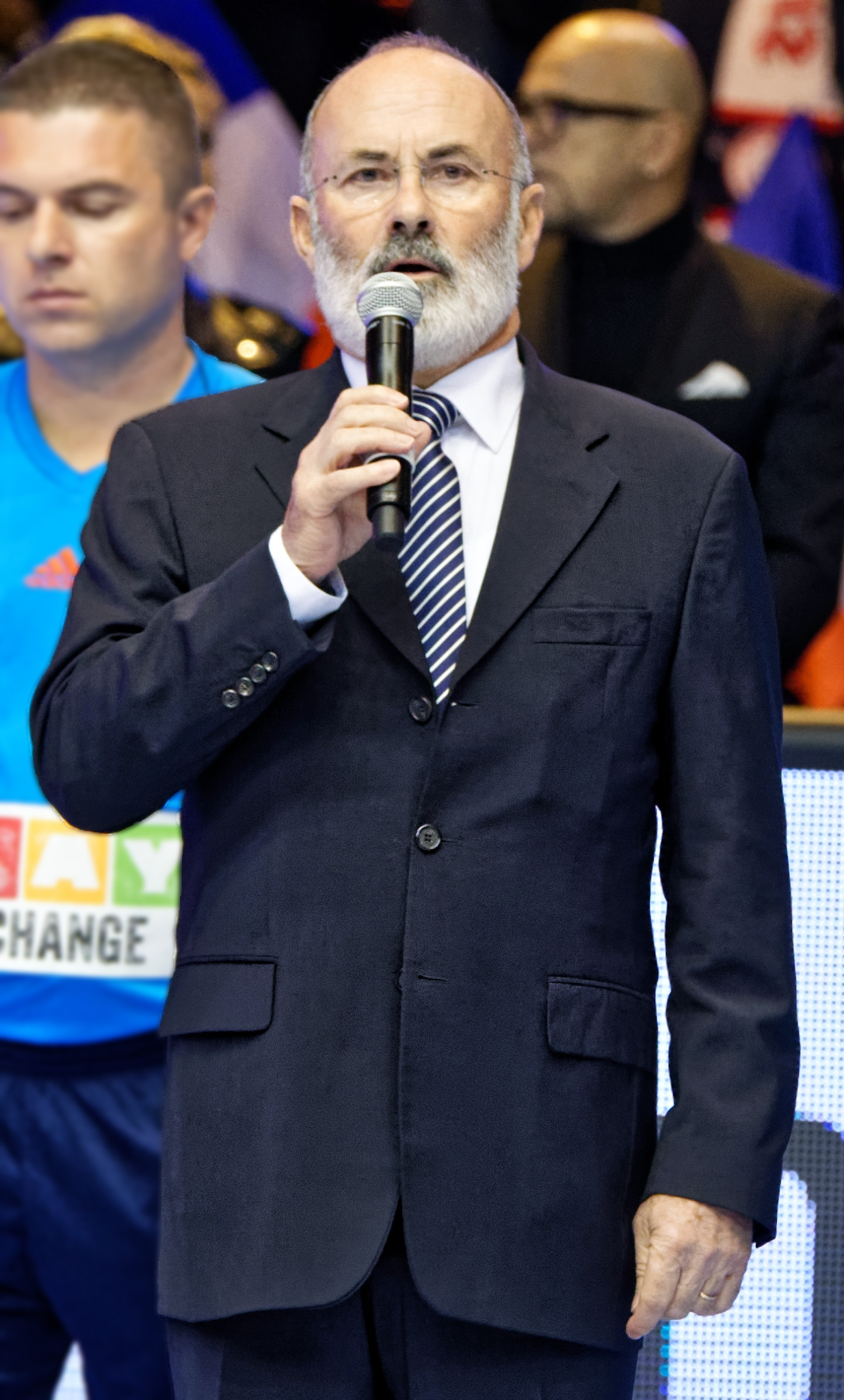
- Jean Brihault in preamble of the champions league match PSG Handball vs SG Flensburg-Handewitt, at the Halle Carpentier (Paris), on November 21, 2015.

3rd Honorary President of European Handball Federation
- Incumbent
- Assumed office 17 November 2016
- President: Michael Wiederer (Austria)
- Vice President: Predrag Bošković (Montenegro)
- Preceded by: Tor Lian (Norway)

3rd President of European Handball Federation
- In office 22 June 2012 – 17 November 2016
- Vice President: Arne Elovsson (Sweden)
- Honorary President: Tor Lian (Norway)
- Preceded by: Tor Lian (Norway)
- Succeeded by: Michael Wiederer (Austria)

Vice-President of European Handball Federation
- In office 18 December 2004 – 22 June 2012
- President: Tor Lian (Norway)
- Preceded by: Tor Lian (Norway)
- Succeeded by: Arne Elovsson (Sweden)

President of University of Rennes 2
- In office 15 March 1996 – 1 March 2001
- Preceded by: André Lespagnol
- Succeeded by: François Mouret

Personal details
- Born: 4 June 1947 (age 79)
- Education: Doctorate
- Alma mater: University of Rennes 2
- Occupation: Sports administrator, Professor

Jean Brihault is a professor at the University of Rennes 2 which he holds as position of president from 1996 to 2001. Alongside his teaching activities, he held executive positions in the world of handball. He was the president of European Handball Federation and the vice-president of International Handball Federation from 2012 to 2016.

== Biography ==
=== Education ===
In 1969 he obtained a degree in English language and general license. In 1970 he obtained an English mastery on research topic "The New Irish Question" and the theoretical CAPES. He obtained the aggregation in 1971. He obtained a doctorate in the research subject "Lady Morgan and Ireland" in the year 1985. His research director is Professor Jean Noel.

=== Career as a teacher ===
- 1971-1972: Associate trainee at Rennes Lycée Anne de Bretagne and University of Rennes 2.
- 1972-1974: Associate Professor at the Lycée Baimbridge to Pointe-à-Pitre in the framework of the Technical Support.
- 1974-1981: Assistant Professor of English at the University of Rennes 2.
- 1981-1982: Assistant Professor of English at the University of Rennes 1.
- 1982-1985: Assistant Professor of English at the University of Rennes 2.
- 1985-1989: Professor of English Conference
- 1989-1992: Second-class Professor of literature and Irish Civilization
- 1992: Professor of Literature and Irish Civilization.

== Elective function ==
On March 15, 1996 he was elected as president of the University of Rennes 2, a position he occupied until March 1, 2001.

== Handball career ==
Parallel to his teaching activities, he plays handball at the Cercle Paul Bert in Rennes at the position of center back, before arbitrating a thousand matches then become leader within the French Handball Federation. In 2006 he was elected vice-president of the European Handball Federation by appearing alongside Norwegian Tor Lian, and participates in the organization of many European Handball Championships, the 2010 European Men's Handball Championship. He became president of the European Handball Federation on 22 June 2012.

== Awards ==
Brihault was awarded the title of Knight of the Legion of Honor in February 2004.

Sporting positions
Preceded by Tor Lian	President of European Handball Federation; 2012 - 2016	Succeeded by Michael Wiederer
Academic offices
Preceded by André Lespagnol	President of University of Rennes 2; 1996 - 2001	Succeeded by François Mouret
