= Jean-Claude Maleval =

French psychoanalyst (born 1946)

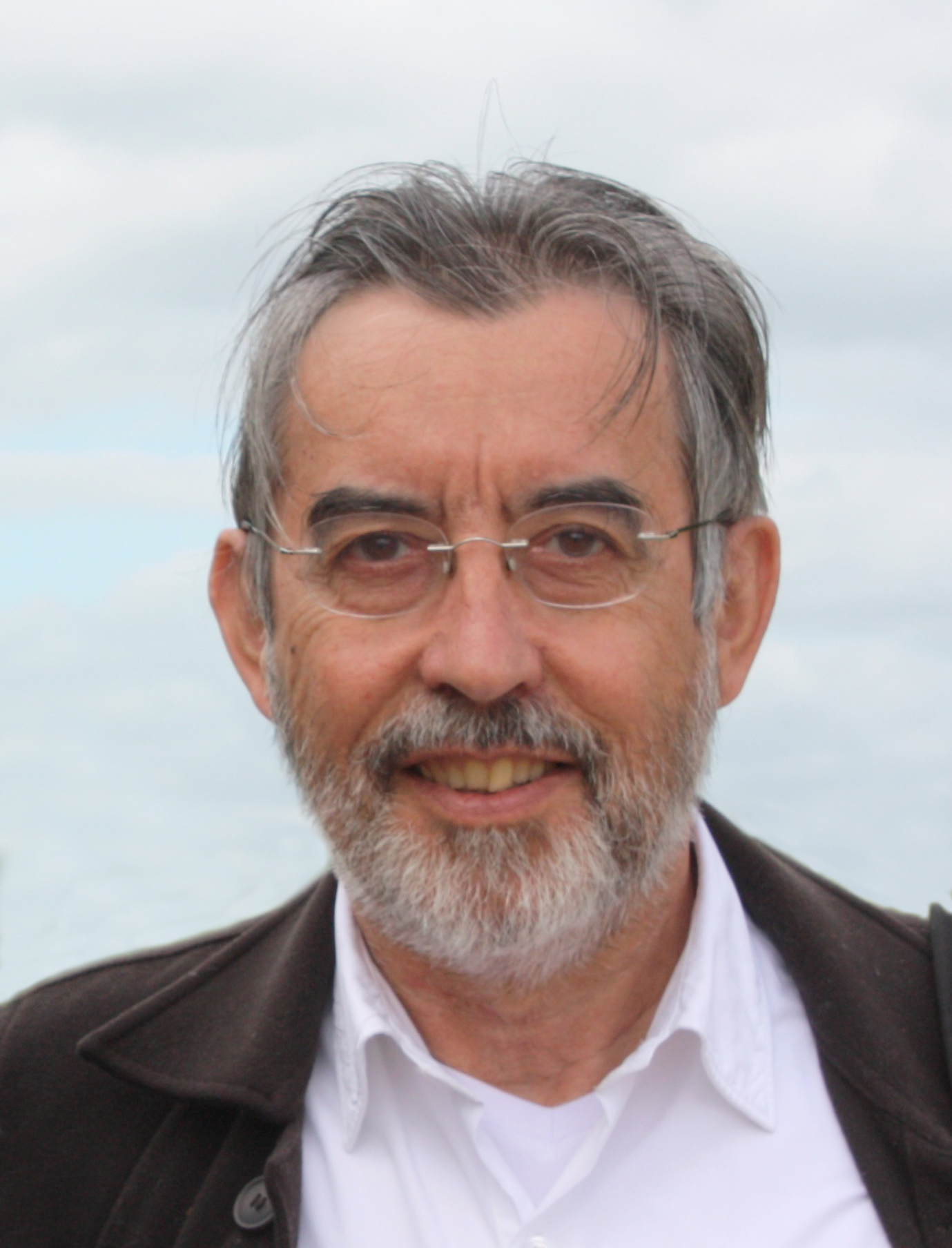

Jean-Claude Maleval (born 1946) is a French Lacanian psychoanalyst, member of the École de la Cause Freudienne and emeritus professor of clinical psychology at the University of Rennes 2 (retired since 2014).

== Biography ==
He studied philosophy and psychology at Paris Nanterre University in 1966. He took part in the events of May 1968 by participating in the March 22 Movement founded by Daniel Cohn-Bendit. He started his psychoanalytic formation in 1968 with G. Testemale but shortly interrupted and continued with Laurence Bataille. He then completed it with Jacques Lacan.

He started practising as a psychoanalyst in Reims in 1975. He was appointed Member of the École Freudienne de Paris in 1977. Jacques Lacan was his supervisor, then, after his death, with one of his students, member of the Fourth Group, François Perrier. In 1986, he wrote a thesis in psychology entitled The Foundations of the Lacanian Investigation of Psychosis under the direction of Professor Yves Baumstimler at Paris XIII-Villetaneuse University. He became a teacher-researcher at Rennes 2 University in 1988. He was appointed Professor of Clinical Psychology in 1991. He took charge of the training of clinical psychologists. He contributed to setting up a psychoanalytical orientation in the teaching of psychopathology at the University of Rennes 2. He was a member of the Board of Directors of this one between 1998 and 2004, then between 2008 and 2012. He has been professor emeritus since 2014.

He is married to Sophie Marret. She has been a psychoanalyst and professor in the department of psychoanalysis at Paris VIII University since 2009. They have two children, Flavien, born in 1992, and Lara, born in 1996.

He was president of "Psychoanalysis and University Research" (PERU) from 1992 to 2006.

In 1998, he contributed as an expert to the Belgian consensus conference on the treatment of schizophrenia. He defended the proposition that, in case of non-compliance with treatment, and in case of non-dangerousness, "it is necessary at all costs to respect the autonomy of the patient, and to rely on the therapeutic alliance".

He has been president of the University Psychological Aid Office (BAPU) in Rennes since 2005. An institution that offers psychoanalytic cures accessible to students.

He is among the founding members of the Ecole de la Cause Freudienne instituted by Jacques Lacan in 1981 and he has been a member of the World Association of Psychoanalysis since its creation in 1992. He did the pass twice, following Lacan's invention, to collect testimonies in order to shed light on the decision of becoming psychoanalyst. The first time, in 1979, the procedure was interrupted by the dissolution of the Freudian School of Paris in early 1980, so that his testimony remained unanswered. The second time, in 2016, it was not validated. However, he chose to publish his testimony as a clinical case. He says he wants to remain « Psychoanalyst Apprentice » (AP).

== Works ==
In 1981 in « Hysterical madness and Dissociative psychoses », Jean-Claude Maleval endeavors to retrace how the confusion between the clinic of psychoses and all the phenomena relating to that of neuroses has grown since 1910, seeking to rehabilitate the concept of Hysterical madness which would have been buried largely in the tentacular schizophrenia of Bleuler. With « The Logic of Delirium », he developed in 1997 an indication by Jacques Lacan concerning the existence of a "scale of delusions", by apprehending it from a consideration of the economy of jouissance. In this approach, the progression of chronic delirium follows the following stages: it begins in an initial state of perplexity, then seeks to structure itself in a paranoid mode, it achieves this by building a paranoid systematization, and ends with paraphrenia megalomaniac. « The foreclosure of the Name of the Father. The concept and its clinic », published in 2000, seeks to clarify and specify the concept that Lacan makes the characteristic of the psychotic structure. The first part traces the construction and evolution of the concept of the Name-of-the-Father foreclosure, while the second discusses the scope of the evolution of this concept with regard to therapy. « Landmarks for Ordinary Psychosis » published in 2019 specifies the clinic of a psychoanalytic notion which designates an original positioning of the « parlêtre ». Ordinary psychosis arises from the assumption that there is a psychotic structure in people who do not have overt psychotic disorders. Maleval approaches it from the last teaching of Lacan, in particular by relying on the latter's work devoted to the Irish writer James Joyce.

In 2013, he participated in the creation of a website, Listening to autistic persons (autistes-et-cliniciens.org) that seeks to promote a psychodynamic approach to autism. He advocates the idea of relying on the passions of autistic persons to promote their evolution, an idea that is not new, but according to him undeniably essential to their care. He shares the conclusions of some parents of autistic children that "showing a child that you take his passion seriously and that you want to share it with him is the most powerful of catalysts".

In 2013 he was in favor of marriage equality. According to him, analytical ethics does not judge the choice of subjects. It encourages everyone to do with the irreducible singularity of his enjoyment.

In 2019, following the work of Rosine and Robert Lefort, French lacanians psychoanalysts, he attempts to identify the characteristics of a subjective autistic structure which differs from that of psychosis.

Maleval inscribes his research on autism in the lineage of the Leforts who, from the 1990s, consider autism as an original subjective structure, that is to say a different affective and cognitive functioning, and not as a pathology, or as a handicap. This position is quite analogous to that of Baron-Cohen, who makes autism a "condition", and that of Mottron, for whom it is a "human variant".

"In the Lacanian clinic, reports Brenner, in "The Autistic Subject", autism is not designated as a physical or behavioral disorder, but, rather as a subjective structure [...] Accordingly, autism is not diagnosed on the basis of a set of accumulating behavioral traits but is determined by structural criteria that manifest in the subject's relationship with language and jouissance. In the last two decades, Maleval provided several perspectives through which the clinic of autism can be articulated in this way. The models Maleval presents in his different papers are somewhat independent and can be said to display a progression in the development of his understanding of the autistic mode of access to language and jouissance. It is in his paper "Extension du spectre de l'autisme" (Autism spectrum extension)(2015) that Maleval seems to integrate these different models on the basis of his notion of the "development" of the rim".

== Bibliography ==
=== Works ===
• Folies hystériques et Psychoses dissociatives. Payot. Paris.1981. 315 p. (2e édition: 1985; 3e édition: 1991, 4e édition : 2007) (ISBN 2-228-22170-8).

• Logique du délire. Masson. Paris. 1997. 215 p. (2e édition : 2000) (ISBN 2-294-00277-6)

• La forclusion du Nom-du-Père. Le concept et sa clinique. (Foreclosure of the Name-of-the-Father. The concept and its clinic ). Seuil. Paris. 2000. (ISBN 2-02-037377-7)

• L’ autiste et sa voix. (The autistic and his voice) Seuil. Paris. 2009. (ISBN 978-2-02-098033-3)

• Écoutez les autistes. (Listen to the autistics) Navarin / Le champ freudien. Paris. 2012. (ISBN 978-2-916124-15-5)

• Étonnantes mystifications de la psychothérapie authoritaire. ( Amazing mystifications of authoritarian psychotherapy) Navarin / Le champ freudien. 2012. (ISBN 978-2-916124-16-2)

• Repères pour la psychose ordinaire. (Landmarks for ordinary psychosis) Navarin/Le champ freudien. Paris. 2019. (ISBN 978-2-916124-63-6)

° La différence autistique. Presses Universitaires de Vincennes. 2021. (The autistic difference) (ISBN 978-2-37924-199-4)

° Conversations psychanalytiques avec des psychotiques ordinaires et extraordinaires. (Psychoanalytical conversations with ordinary and extraordinary psychotics) (ISBN 978-2-7492-7396-9)

° De la structure autistique et des faux autistes. Presses Universitaires de Vincennes. 2025. (ISBN 978-2-37924-573-2)

=== Translated works ===
In Spanish:

• Locuras histericas y psicosis disociativas. Buenos-Aires, Mexico. Paidos. 1987. (ISBN 950-12-3961-6)

• Logica del delirio. Ediciones Del Serbal. Barcelone. 1998. (ISBN 84-7628-260-5)

• La forclusion del Nombre del Padre. El concepto y su clinica. Buenos Aires. Paidos. 2002. (ISBN 950-12-3612-9)

• El autista y su voz. Gredos. Madrid. 2011.[ISBN 978-84-249-2106-4]

• !Escuchen a los autistas ! Grama.Ediciones. 2016.

. Coordenadas para la psicosis ordinaria. Grama Ediciones. 2020.[ISBN 978-987-8372-457]

° La Diferencia autistica. Grama ediciones. 2025. (ISBN 9786316643 -38-4)

In Italian:

• Isteria e follia. Logica del delirio come tentativo di guarigione. Bruno Mondadori. Milan. 2011. (ISBN 978-888-6159)

° La forclusione del Nome-del-Padre. Il concetto e la clinica. Quodlibet Studio. 2026.(ISBN 978-88-229-2363-9)

In Greek:

• Ο αυτιοτικοs και η φωνη τομ. EKKPEMEΞ. 2016. (The autistic and his voice).(ISBN 9766185076 -17-7)

In Portuguese:

• O Autista e a sua Voz. Blucher. 2017. (ISBN 978-85-212-1162-4)

=== Papers in english ===
« Why so many borderlines? », in Psychoanalytical Notebooks of the London Circle., 2000, 4, pp. 111–127.

« The «alien abduction» syndrome », in Lands of Darkness. (texts compiled by Nick Totton) . Karnac books. London. 2003.

« Rather verbose, the autistic subject », in Ornicar ? digital, revue électronique multilingue de psychanalyse, 299, avril 2007.

« From dementia praecocissima to autism sprectrum disorders », in International Lacanian Review. (with Grollier M and Druel G.) 2009, 5.

« Why is the Depression Bubble Bursting ? » Hurly-Burly. The International Lacanian Journal of Psychoanalysis. 2009, 2, pp. 207- 220

« Breaking the Frame to Free the Analyst's Desire ». Hurly-Burly. The International Lacanian Journal of Psychoanalysis, 2010, 3, pp. 149-154.

« Why is the ideology of evaluation pernicious ? » Psychoanalytic Notebooks. The London Society of the New Lacanian School. 2010, 21, pp. 127-135.

« Listen to the Autists ! » Hurly-Burly. The International Lacanian Journal of Psychoanalysis, 2012, 7, pp. 171-192.

« What Can Psychotics Hope for Today? (conference program)» (PDF). Quebec: International Forum for Psychoanalytic Education. 2008. p. 11. Archived from the original (pdf) on 2011-07-26.

« Why the hypothesis of an autistic structure ? » Psychoanalytic notebooks. The London Society of the New Lacanian School. 2012, 25, pp. 27-49.

« Treatment of the psychoses and contemporary psychoanalysis », in Lacan on Madness (Edited by Gherovici P. and Steinkoler M.). Routledge. London. 2015, pp. 99-111.

« Who are autists ? ». Lacunae. International Journal for Lacanian Psychoanalysis. Dublin. Issue 10, May 2015, pp. 19-58.

« Mottron's Happy autist is not Kanner's » (in collaboration with M. Grolllier). Lacunae. International Journal for Lacanian Psychoanalysis. Dublin., Issue 16, July 2018, pp. 6–53.

“ Foreword” of “The Autistic Subject. On the Threshold of Language” by Brenner L.S. Palgrave Macmillan. 2020, pp. VII-XXVI.

« Freezing and Thawing of S1 in the Autistic Subject » (in collaboration with M. Grollier). The Lacanian Review. Journal of the New Lacanian School and the World Association of Psychoanalysis. Spring 2021, Issue 11, pp. 183–213.

« Can the autistic rim become Sinthome? » (in collaboration with M . Grollier) Lacunae. International Journal for Lacanian Psychoanalysis. Dublin. June 2022, Issue 24, pp. 8–54.
