= André Lespagnol =

French politician and professor (1943–2020)

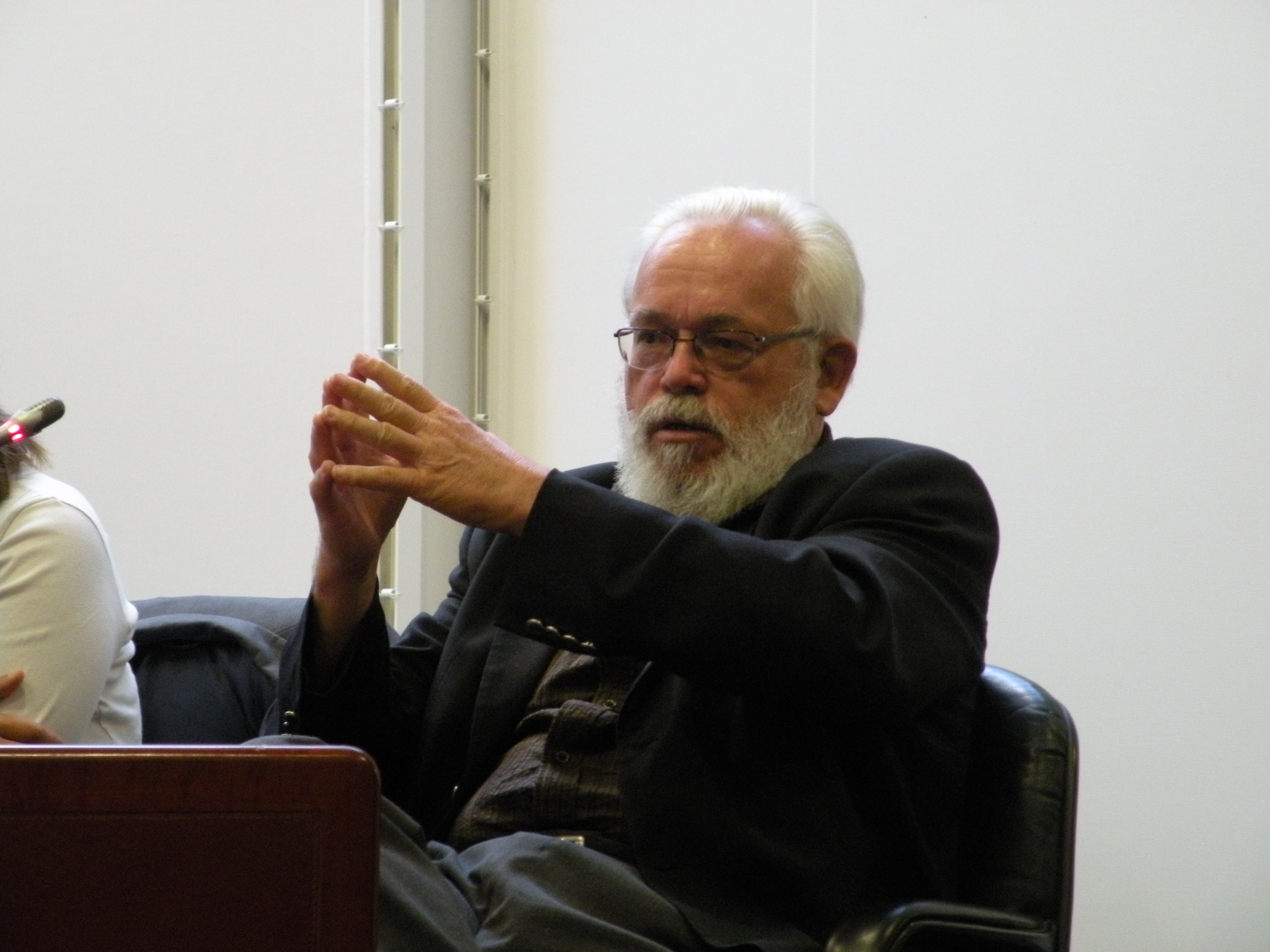
- Lespagnol in 2009

President of the University of Rennes 2
- In office 1991–1996
- Preceded by: Jean Mounier
- Succeeded by: Jean Brihault

Personal details
- Born: 26 July 1943 Crozon, France
- Died: 13 September 2020 (aged 77) Saint-Grégoire, France
- Education: University of Nantes; University of Rennes
- Profession: Politician professor

André Lespagnol (26 July 1943 – 13 September 2020) was a French politician and professor. He held an Agrégation in history and first taught in Quebec before heading to the University of Rennes 2, focusing on the history of Saint-Malo. He was president of the University of Rennes 2 from 1991 to 1996 before becoming Rector of the Academy of Reims, then Créteil. In 2004, he was elected vice-president of the Regional Council of Brittany, serving until 2010.

== Biography ==
Lespagnol attended Lycées in La Baule-Escoublac and Saint-Nazaire before beginning his studies in history at the University of Nantes and subsequently, the University of Rennes. He received an agrégation in history in 1965 and began teaching at the Lycée Ambroise-Paré in Laval before working as a research assistant at the Université de Montréal in Canada until 1970. He returned to France to work as an assistant at the newly-formed University of Rennes 2. He became an assistant professor in 1978, a lecturer in 1984, and finally became a professor of history in 1990 after defending his doctoral thesis the prior year.

Lespagnol was elected president of the University of Rennes 2 in 1991. The university developed much of its infrastructure during his presidency, with the opening of the Harp Campus in 1993 being a major step. A social science research center was also created as part of the Modernization plans of French universities. Several structural changes were also made. The Presses Universitaires de Rennes revised its statutes. The university also signed an agreement with the French National Centre for Scientific Research in 1995. Jean Brihault, elected on 15 March 1996, would succeed Lespagnol as president of the university.

Lespagnol was appointed Rector of the Academy of Reims on 25 November 1998 and took office on 2 December. He would take care of several tasks, such as the revival of priority zones, reform in lycées, decentralized movement of lycée staff, and the establishment on multi-site middle schools in rural areas to help avoid their closure. He helped prepare contracts between the Ministry of Education and the French Government.

André Lespagnol died on 13 September 2020 at the age of 77.

== Decorations ==
- Knight of the Legion of Honour (1998)

== Books ==
- Histoire de Saint-Malo et du pays malouin (1984)
- Les Mutations économiques et sociales au xixe siècle (1984)
- Jacques Cartier (1984)
- Saint-Malo (1990)
- Messieurs de Saint-Malo : Une élite négociante au temps de Louis XIV (1991)
- La Course malouine au temps de Louis XIV : entre l'argent et la gloire (1995)
- Les Bretons et la Mer (2005)
- Les Français, la Terre et la Mer : XIIIe-XXe siècle (2005)
- Mutations économiques et sociales : 1780–1880 (2005)

Academic offices
Preceded by Jean Mounier	President of University of Rennes 2; 1991 - 1996	Succeeded by Jean Brihault
