= Dominique Briquel =

French archeologist (born 1946)

- Born: 21 January 1946 (age 80); Nancy, France
- Occupations: archaeologist, Classical scholar, Etruscologist

Academic background
- Education: École Normale Supérieure, Université de Paris-Sorbonne, École pratique des hautes études,

Academic work
- Discipline: Archeology
- Sub-discipline: Etruscan studies
- Institutions: École française de Rome, University of Burgundy, École pratique des hautes études, Université de Paris-Sorbonne.

Dominique Briquel (born 21 January 1946) is a French scholar, a specialist in both archaeology and etruscology. Briquel studied at the École Normale Supérieure from 1964 to 1969 and was a member of the École française de Rome from 1971 to 1974. Since 1974, he has taught Latin at the École Normale Supérieure. From 1984 to 1996, he was a professor of Latin at the University of Burgundy in Dijon. Since 1992, he has been Director of studies at the École pratique des hautes études, in the department of historical and philological sciences, and since 1996, professor of Latin at the Université de Paris-Sorbonne.

His fields of research are the language and civilization of the Etruscans, as well as the earliest periods of Roman history.

He is married to the CNRS research director and Syriac scholar Françoise Briquel-Chatonnet.

== Honours ==
- corresponding members of the Académie des Inscriptions et Belles-Lettres.
- foreign corresponding member of the Académie Royale de Belgique.
- foreign member of Istituto Nazionale di Studi Etruschi ed Italici, Florence.
- foreign corresponding member of the Istituto Lombardo, Accademia di Scienze e Lettere, Milan.

== Main publications ==
Research works:

- Les Pélasges en Italie, recherches sur l’histoire de la légende, Bibliothèque des Écoles Françaises d’Athènes et de Rome, n° 252, Rome, 1984.
- L’origine lydienne des Étrusques, histoire du thème dans la littérature antique, series of the École Française de Rome, n° 139, Rome, 1991.
- Les Tyrrhènes, peuple des tours, l’autochtonie des Étrusques chez Denys d’Halicarnasse, series of the École Française de Rome, n° 178, 1993.
- Chrétiens et haruspices : la religion étrusque, dernier rempart du paganisme romain, Presses de l’École Normale Supérieure, Paris, 1997.
- Le regard des autres, les origines de Rome vues par ses ennemis (début du IVe siècle/ début du Ier siècle av. J.-C.), Annales Littéraires de l’Université de Franche-Comté, n° 623, Besançon, 1997.
- 18-19 mars 210 av. J.-C., le Forum brûle : un épisode méconnu de la deuxième guerre punique, series Kubaba, série Antiquité, L’Harmattan, Paris, 2002.
- Mythe et révolution. La fabrication d’un récit : la naissance de la république à Rome, series Latomus, n° 308, Brussels, 2007
- La prise de Rome par les Gaulois, lecture mythique d¹un événement historique, Presses de l’Université Paris-Sorbonne, series Religions dans l’Histoire, Paris, 2008

Research publications:

- Les Étrusques, peuple de la différence, series Civilisations U, éditions Armand Colin, Paris, 1993.
- La civilisation étrusque, éditions Fayard, Paris, 1999.
- Les Étrusques, series Que sais-je?, PUF, Paris, 2005.
- Tite-Live, les origines de Rome (Histoire romaine, livre I), bilingual edition presented and annotated by Dominique Briquel), series Folio classique, Éditions Gallimard, Paris, 2007.

Works in collaboration:

- Les religions de l’Antiquité, under the direction of Y. Lehmann, series Premier Cycle, PUF, Paris, 1999; contribution personnelle : Partie "La religion étrusque", p. 7-75.
- Histoire romaine, tome I, Des origines à Auguste, éditions Fayard, under the direction of François Hinard, Paris, 2000;
  - chapter I: "Le sillon du fondateur",
  - II: "La lente genèse d’une cité",
  - III: "Des rois venus du nord",
  - IV: "Les débuts difficiles de la liberté",
  - V: "La nuit du Ve siècle",
  - VI: "Le tournant du IVe siècle"; in collaboration with G. Brizzi,
  - VII: "La marche vers le sud",
  - VIII: "La rencontre de Rome et de l’hellénisme", p. 11-336, bibliography p. 923-968.
- Les urnes cinéraires étrusques de l’époque hellénistique, Musée du Louvre, catalogue RMN, with M.-F. Briguet, Paris, 2002; contribution personnelle : 2nd part, « Les inscriptions », p. 181-243.
