= Louis Rabinowitz =

Louis Rabinowitz may refer to:

- Louis Isaac Rabinowitz (1906–1984), Orthodox rabbi, historian and philologist
- Louis M. Rabinowitz (1887–1957), American businessman, philanthropist and art collector
