= Agrippina the Elder =

Member of the Julio-Claudian dynasty (died AD 33)

- Bust at Museo Torlonia
- Born: c. 14 BC; Athens, Greece
- Died: AD 33 (aged 46); Pandataria
- Burial: AD 33; Pandataria relocated in March AD 37 to the Mausoleum of Augustus
- Spouse: Germanicus
- Issue: 9, including: Nero Caesar; Drusus Caesar; Gaius Caesar (Caligula); Agrippina the Younger; Julia Livilla; Julia Drusilla
- Dynasty: Julio-Claudian
- Father: Marcus Vipsanius Agrippa
- Mother: Julia the Elder

Vipsania Agrippina the Elder (also, in Latin, Agrippina Germanici, "Germanicus's Agrippina"; c. 14 BC – AD 33) was a prominent member of the Julio-Claudian dynasty. She was the daughter of Marcus Vipsanius Agrippa (a close supporter of the first Roman emperor, Augustus) and Augustus' daughter, Julia the Elder. Her brothers Lucius and Gaius Caesar were the adoptive sons of Augustus, and were his heirs until their deaths in AD 2 and 4, respectively. Following their deaths, her second cousin Germanicus was made the adoptive son of Tiberius, Augustus' stepson, as part of the succession scheme in the adoptions of AD 4 (in which Tiberius was adopted by Augustus). As a result of the adoption, Agrippina was wed to Germanicus in order to bring him closer to the Julian family.

Agrippina the Elder is known to have traveled with Germanicus throughout his career, taking her children wherever they went. In AD 14, Germanicus was deployed in Gaul as a governor and general, and, while there, the late Augustus sent her son Gaius to stay with her. Agrippina liked to dress him in a little soldiers' outfit for which Gaius earned the nickname "Caligula" ("little soldier's boots"). After three years in Gaul, they returned to Rome, and her husband was awarded a triumph on 26 May AD 17 to commemorate his victories. The following year, Germanicus was sent to govern over the eastern provinces. While Germanicus was active in his administration, the governor of Syria Gnaeus Calpurnius Piso began feuding with him. During the feud, her husband died of illness on 10 October AD 19.

Germanicus was cremated in Antioch, and she transported his ashes to Rome where they were interred at the Mausoleum of Augustus. Agrippina was vocal in claims of her husband being murdered in order to promote Tiberius' son, Drusus Julius Caesar ("Drusus the Younger"), as heir. Following the model of her stepgrandmother Livia, she spent the time following Germanicus' death supporting the cause of her sons Nero and Drusus Caesar. This put her and her sons at odds with the powerful Praetorian prefect Lucius Aelius Sejanus, who began eliminating their supporters with accusations of treason and sexual misconduct in AD 26. Her family's rivalry with Sejanus would culminate with her and Nero's exile in AD 29. Nero was exiled to Pontia and she was exiled to the island of Pandateria, where she would remain until her death by starvation in AD 33.

== Name ==
Following the Roman custom of parents and children sharing the same nomen and cognomen, people in the same family often shared the same name. Accordingly, Marcus Vipsanius Agrippa's first daughter with Attica was named Vipsania Agrippina. (Note: This is the name given in CIL VI 40321, although the text is almost entirely a reconstruction. Tacitus calls her "Vipsania" in his Annals.) To distinguish Agrippa and Julia's daughter from their granddaughter Julia Agrippina, historians refer to this daughter as "Agrippina the Elder" (Latin: Agrippina Maior). Likewise, Agrippina's daughter is referred to as "Agrippina the Younger" (Minor). Like her father, Agrippina the Elder avoided her nomen and has not been found to have used "Vipsania" in inscription. An inscription in Rhodiapolis records her with the nomen "Julia", although this appears to be a mistake.

== Background ==
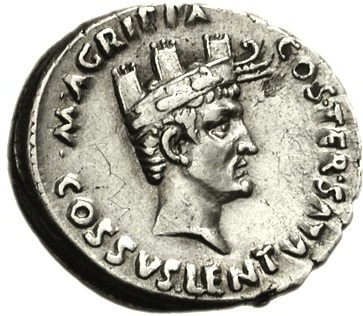
A denarius depicting Agrippa wearing a combination of the corona muralis and the corona rostalis.

Marcus Vipsanius Agrippa was an early supporter of Augustus (then "Octavius"). He was a key general in Augustus' armies, commanding troops during the wars against Sextus Pompey and Mark Antony. From early in the emperor's reign, Agrippa was trusted to handle affairs in the eastern provinces and was even given the signet ring of Augustus, who appeared to be on his deathbed in 23 BC, a sign that he would become princeps were Augustus to die. It is probable that he was to rule until the emperor's nephew, Marcus Claudius Marcellus, came of age. However, Marcellus died that year of an illness that became an epidemic in Rome.

Now, with Marcellus dead, Augustus arranged for the marriage of Agrippa to his daughter Julia the Elder, who was previously the wife of Marcellus. Agrippa was given tribunicia potestas ("the tribunician power") in 18 BC, a power that only the emperor and his immediate heir could hope to attain. The tribunician power allowed him to control the Senate, and it was first given to Julius Caesar. Agrippa acted as tribune in the Senate to pass important legislation and, though he lacked some of the emperor's power and authority, he was approaching the position of co-regent.

After the birth of Agrippa's second son, Lucius, in 17 BC, Lucius and his brother Gaius were adopted together by Augustus. Around the time of their adoption in the summer, Augustus held the fifth ever Ludi Saeculares ("Secular Games"). Cassius Dio says the adoption of the boys coupled with the games served to introduce a new era of peace – the Pax Augusta. It is not known what Agrippa thought of their adoption; however, following their adoption, Agrippa was dispatched to govern the eastern provinces, bringing his family with him.

== Early life and family ==
Agrippina was born in 14 BC to Marcus Vipsanius Agrippa and Julia the Elder, before their return to Rome in 13 BC. She had several siblings, including half-sisters Vipsania Agrippina, Vipsania Attica, Vipsania Marcella and Vipsania Marcellina (from her father's marriages to Pomponia Caecilia Attica and Claudia Marcella Major); and four full siblings, with three brothers; Gaius, Lucius, and Postumus Agrippa (all were adopted by Augustus; Gaius and Lucius were adopted together following Lucius' birth in 17 BC; Postumus in AD 4), and a sister Julia the Younger.

She was a prominent member of the Julio-Claudian dynasty. On her mother's side, she was the younger granddaughter of Augustus. She was the Stepdaughter of Tiberius by her mother's marriage to him, and sister in law of Claudius, the brother of her husband Germanicus. Her son Gaius, better known as "Caligula", would be the third emperor, and her grandson Nero would be the last emperor of the dynasty.

In 13 BC, her father returned to Rome and was promptly sent to Pannonia to suppress a rebellion. Agrippa arrived there that winter (in 12 BC), but the Pannonians gave up that same year. Agrippa returned to Campania in Italy, where he fell ill and died soon after. After her father's death, she spent the rest of her childhood in Augustus' household where access to her was strictly controlled.

Some of the currency issued in 13–12 BC, the aurei and denarii, make it clear that her brothers Gaius and Lucius were Augustus' intended heirs. Their father was no longer available to assume the reins of power if the Emperor were to die, and Augustus had to make it clear who his intended heirs were in case anything should happen. Lucius' and Gaius' military and political careers would steadily advance until their deaths in AD 2 and 4, respectively.

The death of her brothers meant that Augustus had to find other heirs. Although he initially considered Agrippina's second cousin Germanicus a potential heir for a time, Livia convinced Augustus to adopt Tiberius, Livia's son from her first marriage with Tiberius Claudius Nero. Although Augustus adopted Tiberius, it was on condition that Tiberius first adopt Germanicus so that Germanicus would become second in the line of succession. It was a corollary to the adoption, probably in the next year, that Agrippina was married to Germanicus.

By her husband Germanicus, she had nine children: Nero Julius Caesar, Drusus Julius Caesar, Tiberius Julius Caesar, a child of unknown name (normally referenced as Ignotus), Gaius the Elder, the Emperor Caligula (Gaius the Younger), the Empress Agrippina the Younger, Julia Drusilla, and Julia Livilla. Only six of her children came of age; Tiberius and Ignotus died as infants, and Gaius the Elder in his early childhood.

== Marriage ==
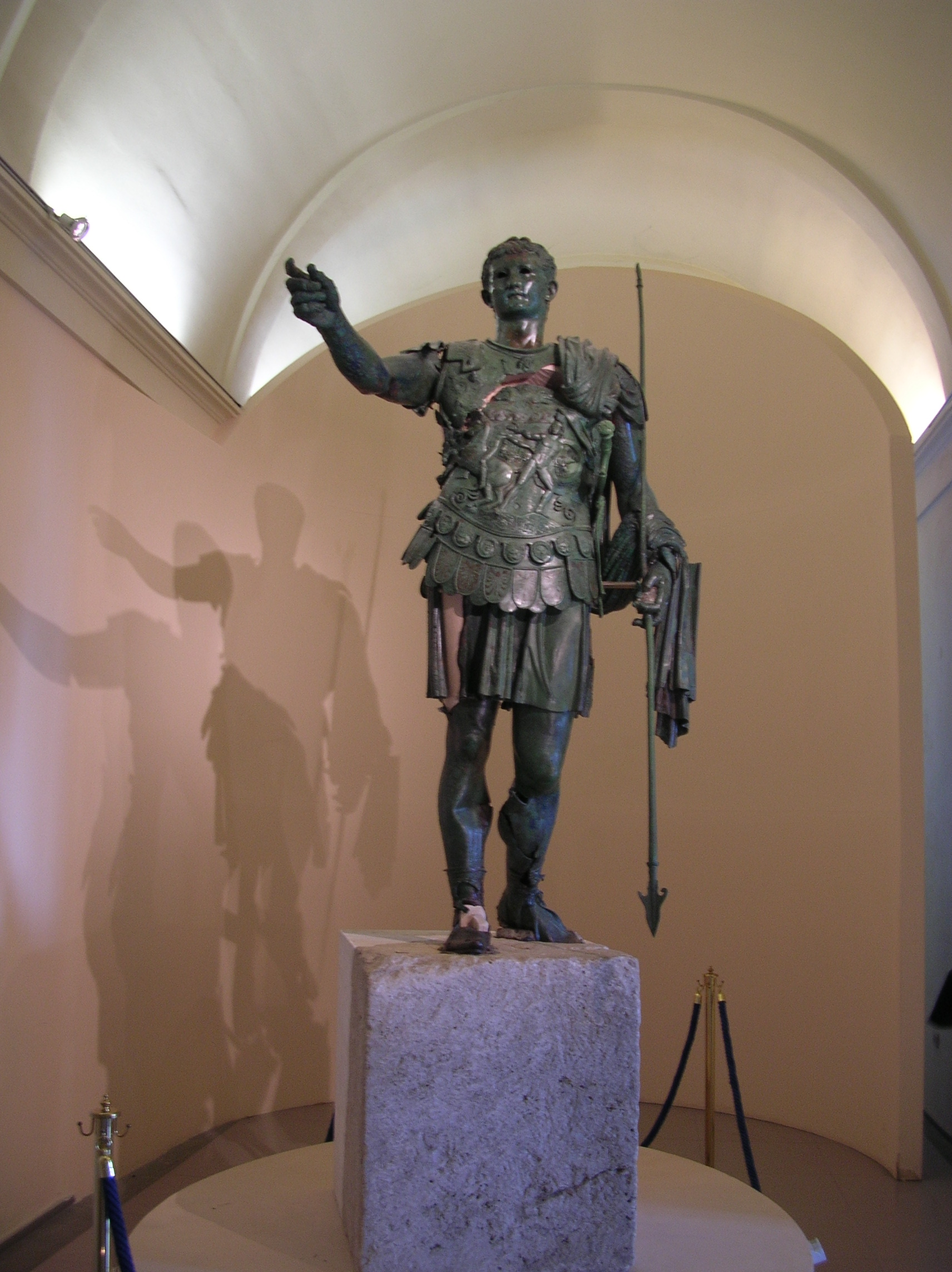
Bronze statue of her husband Germanicus, from Amelia, Umbria

Her husband's career in the military began in AD 6, with the Batonian War in Pannonia and Dalmatia. Throughout Germanicus' military career, Agrippina is known to have traveled with her husband and their children. Germanicus' career advanced steadily as he advanced in ranks following the cursus honorum until, in AD 12, he was made consul. The following year, he was given command over Gaul and the forces on the Rhine, totaling eight legions.

On 18 May AD 14, her one-year-old son Gaius was sent by Augustus from Rome to join her in Gaul. She was pregnant at the time and, while Germanicus was collecting taxes across Gaul, she remained at an unspecified separate location, presumably for her safety. Augustus sent her a letter with her son's party, which read:

Yesterday I arranged with Talarius and Asillinus to bring your boy Gaius on the fifteen day before the Kalends of June, if it be the will of the gods. I send with him besides one of my slaves who is a physician, and I have written to Germanicus to keep him if he wishes. Farewell, my Agrippina, and take care to come in good health to your Germanicus.

Later that year, on 19 August, Augustus died while away in Campania. As a result, Tiberius was made princeps. While Germanicus was administering the oath of fealty to Tiberius, a mutiny began among the forces on the Rhine. During the mutiny, Agrippina brought out their sixth child, Gaius, and made preparations to take him away to a safer town nearby. He was in a full army outfit including the legionary hobnailed boots (caligae). These military-booties earned Gaius the nickname "Caligula" (lit. "little boots"), and garnered sympathy for Agrippina and the child among the soldiery. Tacitus attributes her actions as having quelled the mutiny (Tacitus, Annals 1.40–4).

Once the mutiny was put to an end, Germanicus allowed the soldiers to deal with the ringleaders, which they did with brutal severity. He then led them against the Germanic tribes, perhaps in an effort to prevent future mutiny. Germanicus would remain in Gaul fighting against the Germanic tribes until AD 16, at which time he was recalled to Rome by Tiberius. His campaigns won him much renown among the Roman people, and he was awarded a triumph on 26 May AD 17.

=== Widowhood ===
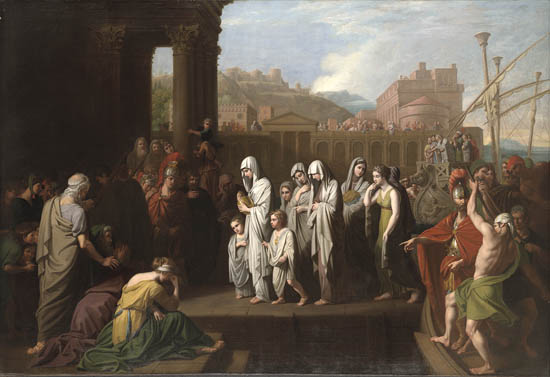
Benjamin West, Agrippina Landing at Brundisium with the Ashes of Germanicus (1768), oil on canvas. Yale University Art Gallery, New Haven.

In AD 18, Agrippina left for the eastern provinces with her family. Germanicus was sent the east to govern the provinces, the same assignment her father was given years earlier. Agrippina was pregnant on their journey east and, on the way to Syria, she gave birth to her youngest daughter Julia Livilla on the island of Lesbos. Inscriptions celebrating her fertility have been found on the island.

Tiberius sent Gnaeus Calpurnius Piso to assist her husband, naming him governor of Syria. During their time there, Germanicus was active in his administration of the eastern regions. Piso did not get along well with Germanicus and their relationship only got worse. In AD 19, Germanicus ordered Piso to leave the province, which Piso began to do. On his way back to Rome, Piso stopped at the island of Kos off the coast of Syria. Around that time Germanicus fell ill and he died on 10 October AD 19 at Antioch. Rumours spread of Piso poisoning her husband on the emperor's orders.

After Germanicus' cremation in the forum of Antioch, Agrippina personally carried the ashes of her husband to Rome. The transportation of the ashes witnessed national mourning. She landed at the port of Brundisium in southern Italy where she was met with huge crowds of sympathizers; a praetorian escort was provided by the emperor in light of her rank as the wife of a governor-general. As she passed each town, the people and local magistrates came out to show their respect. Drusus the Younger (son of Tiberius), Claudius, and the consuls journeyed to join the procession as well. Once she made it to Rome, her husband's ashes were interred at the Mausoleum of Augustus. Tiberius and Livia did not make an appearance.

== Life after Germanicus ==
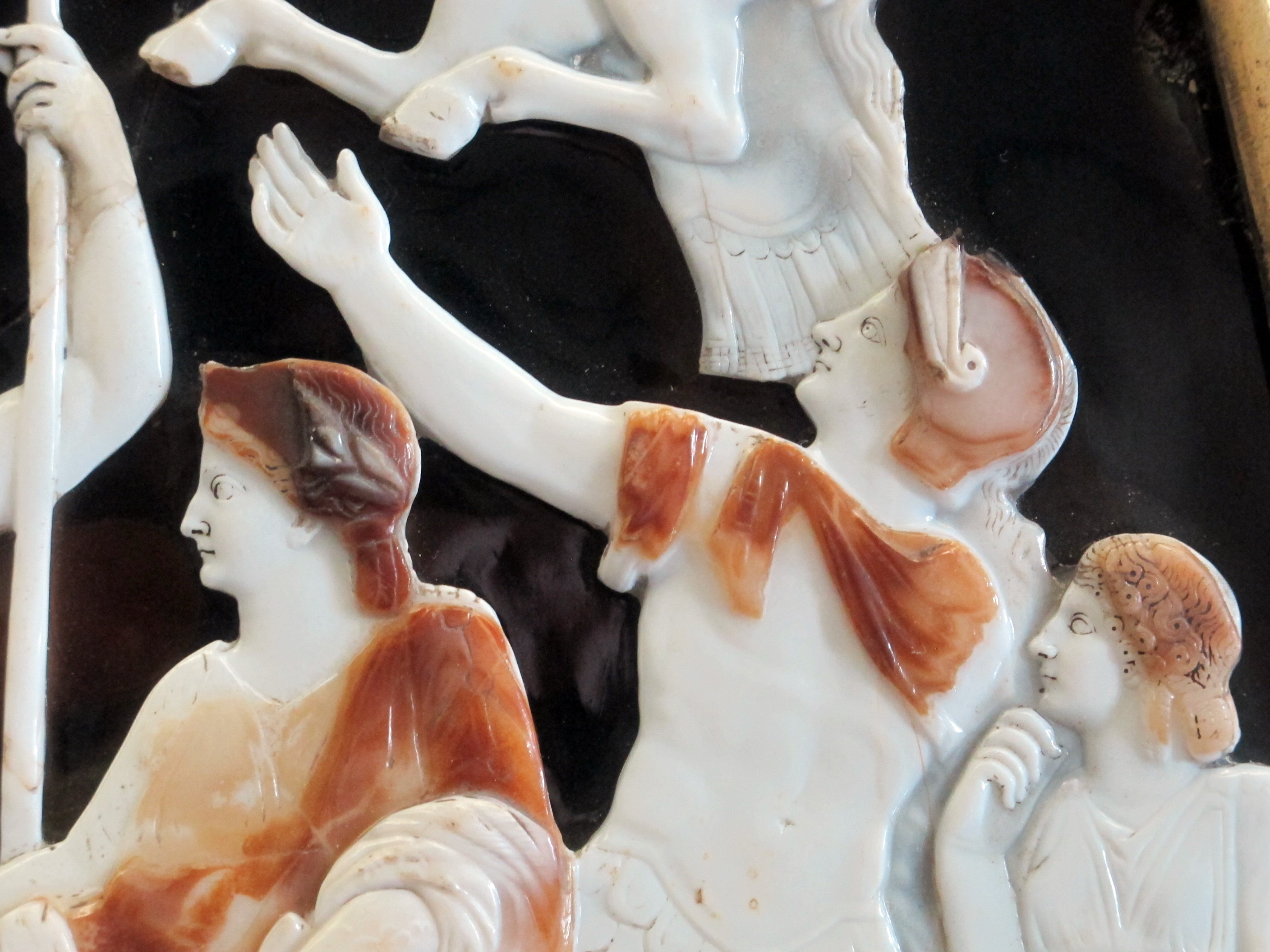
Great Cameo of France detail depicting Livia (left), Drusus (center), and Agrippina the Elder (right).

Her marriage to Germanicus had served to unite the imperial family. Agrippina may have suspected Tiberius' involvement in the death of her husband and, with Germanicus dead, she no longer had any familial ties to the emperor. Historian Richard Alston says it is likely that either Tiberius or Livia were behind the exile of Agrippina's sister Julia the Younger and the death of Postumus. He notes the death of Agrippina's mother, who starved herself to death amidst her exile in AD 14, linking her death to Tiberius' disdain for her.

Agrippina was vocal about her feelings claiming that Germanicus was murdered to promote Drusus the Younger as Tiberius' heir, and worried that the birth of the Younger Drusus' twin sons would displace her own sons in the line of succession.

At about this time, Tiberius' Praetorian Prefect Sejanus was becoming powerful in Rome and began feuding with Drusus the Younger. While the exact causes of the feud are unknown, it ended when the Younger Drusus died of seemingly natural causes on 14 September AD 23. After the death of Tiberius' son, Agrippina wanted to advance the careers of her sons, who were all potential heirs for Tiberius. It has been suggested that to achieve this, Agrippina commissioned the Great Cameo of France and presented it to Tiberius as a personalized gift that positioned the family of Germanicus around the emperor. The work was designed to convince Tiberius to choose her children as his heirs.

Ultimately, the death of Tiberius' son elevated her own children to the position of heirs. Her sons were the logical choice, because they were the sons of Germanicus and Tiberius' grandsons were too young. Nero was becoming popular in the Senate due in part, Tacitus says, to his resemblance with his father. The rise of her children was threatening to Sejanus' position. Resultantly, Sejanus began spreading rumors about Agrippina in the imperial court. The coming years were marked with increasing hostility between Sejanus and Agrippina and her sons. This effectively caused factions to rise in the aristocracy between her family and Sejanus.

=== Political rivalry ===
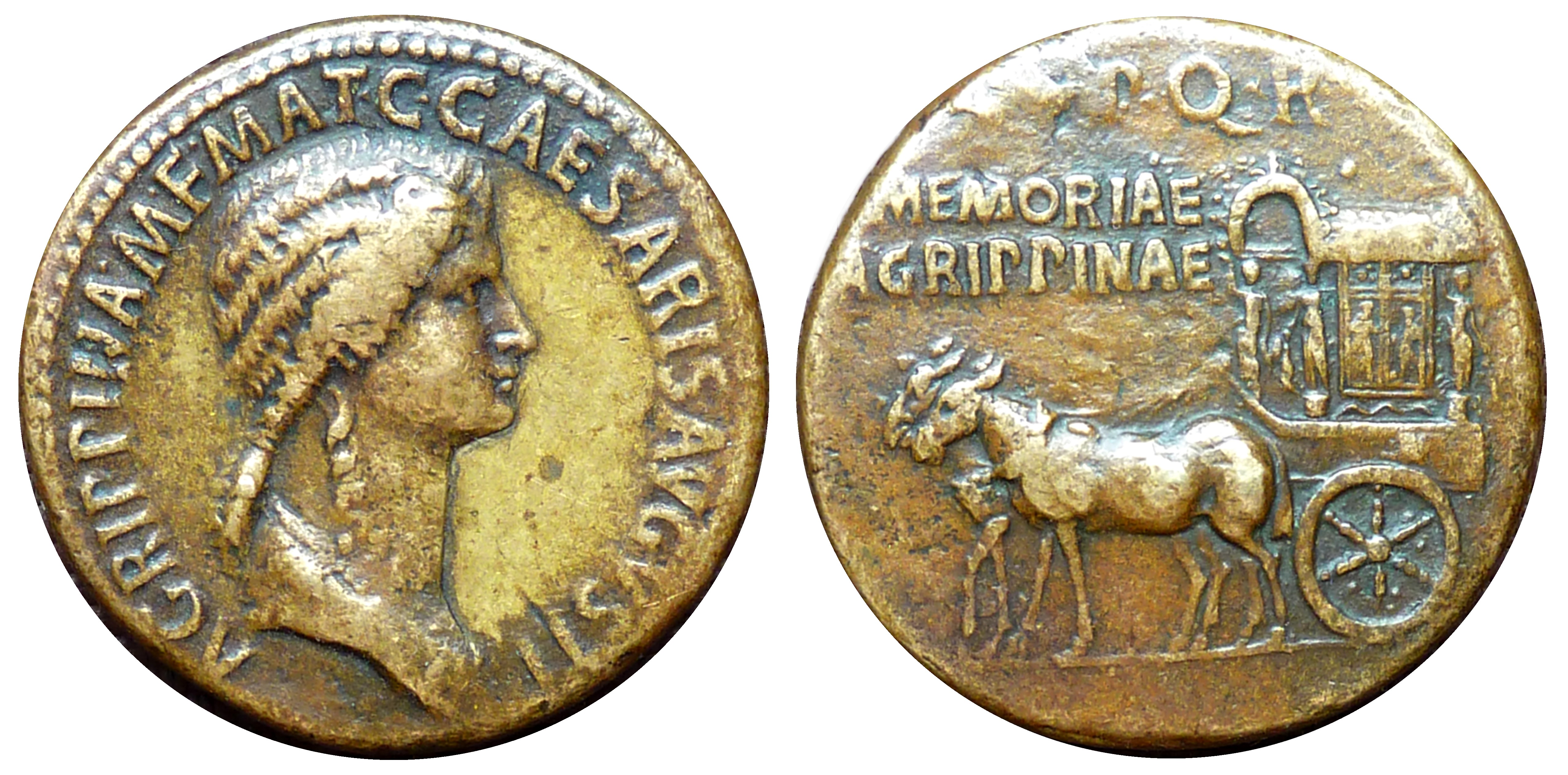
Bronze sestertius of Caligula with Agrippina on the obverse, minted circa AD 37.

On New Year's Day, AD 24, Sejanus had the priests and magistrates add prayers for the health of Nero and Drusus in addition to those normally offered to the emperor on that day. Tiberius was not happy with this and he voiced his displeasure in the Senate. In addition, he questioned the priests of the Palatine. Some of the priests who offered the prayers were relatives of Agrippina and Germanicus. This made Tiberius suspicious of her and marked a change in his attitude toward her and her older sons, but not Caligula.

In AD 25, Sejanus requested Livilla's hand in marriage. Livilla was a niece of the emperor, which would have made him a member of the imperial family. While this did make his ambitions clear, his request was denied. The loss may have been huge for Sejanus had the dissensions in the imperial household not been deteriorating. Relations were so bad that Agrippina refused to eat at Tiberius' dinner parties for fear of being poisoned. She also asked Tiberius if she could be allowed to remarry, which he also refused.

If either of them were allowed to remarry it would have threatened the line of succession that Tiberius was comfortable with. By refusing Sejanus' request, Tiberius made it clear he was content with the children of Germanicus and his own grandchildren being his successors. Had Sejanus married Livilla, their children would have provided another line of possible successors. The implication of Agrippina's request was that she needed a man from outside the imperial family to serve as protector and step-father of possible imperial heirs, a powerful position. It was also an implied reprimand: Tiberius was meant to be the guardian of the imperial family.

Tiberius was in a tough position. He was faced with a conflict between his family and his friend. His solution was surprising. In AD 26, he left Rome altogether and retired to the island of Capri in the Bay of Naples. He cut himself off from the factions altogether and abandoned politics. He left Rome in the care of Sejanus. This allowed Sejanus to freely attack his rivals.

=== Downfall ===
With Tiberius away from Rome, the city would see a rise of politically motivated trials on the part of Sejanus and his supporters against Agrippina and her associates. Many of her friends and associates were subsequently accused of maiestas ("treason") by the growing number of accusers. It was also common to see charges of sexual misconduct and corruption. In AD 27, Agrippina found herself placed under house arrest in her suburban villa outside Herculaneum.

In AD 28, the Senate voted that altars to Clementia (mercy) and Amicitia (friendship) be raised. At that time, Clementia was considered a virtue of the ruling class, for only the powerful could give clemency. The altar of Amicitia was flanked by statues of Sejanus and Tiberius. By this time, his association with Tiberius was such that there were those in Roman society who erected statues in his honor and gave prayers and sacrifices to Sejanus. Sejanus' birthday was honored as if he were a member of the imperial family. According to Richard Alston, "Sejanus' association with Tiberius must have at least indicated to the people that he would be further elevated."

Sejanus did not begin his final attack on Agrippina until after the death of Livia in AD 29. Tacitus reports a letter being sent to the Senate from Tiberius denouncing Agrippina for her arrogance and prideful attitude, and Nero for engaging in shameful sexual activities. The Senate would not begin these highly unpopular prosecutions against her or her son until it received clear instructions from Tiberius to do so. Despite public outcry, Agrippina and Nero were declared public enemies (hostes) following a repeat of the accusations by the emperor. They were both exiled; Nero to Pontia where he was killed or encouraged to commit suicide in AD 31, and Agrippina to the island of Pandateria (the same place her daughter was exiled to).

Suetonius says that while on the island of Pandateria, she lost an eye when she was beaten by a centurion. She would remain on the island until her death in AD 33. Accounts of her death vary. She is said to have died from starvation, but it is not certain whether or not it was self-imposed. Tacitus says food was withheld from her in an effort to make her death seem like a suicide.

== Post mortem ==
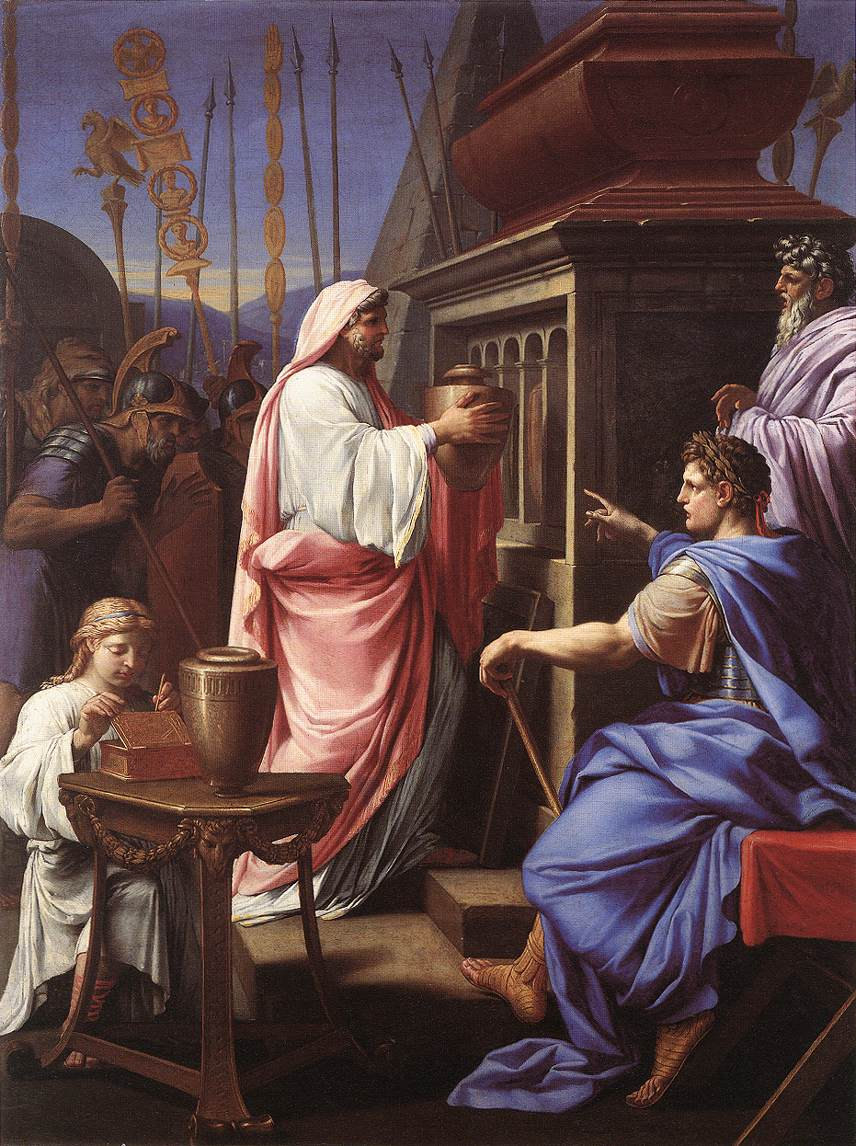
Caligula Depositing the Ashes of his Mother and Brother in the Tomb of his Ancestors, painting by Eustache Le Sueur (1647)

Inscription on the marble block that held the cinerary urn of Agrippina in the Mausoleum of Augustus (now in the Capitoline Museums)

Her son Drusus was later also exiled on charges of sexual misdemeanors. Sejanus remained powerful until his sudden downfall and summary execution in October AD 31, just after the death of Nero, the exact cause for which remains unclear. Alston suggests that Sejanus may have been acting in Tiberius' favor to remove Germanicus' family from power, noting that Agrippina and Nero's brother Drusus were left in exile even after Sejanus' death.

The deaths of Agrippina's older sons elevated her youngest son Caligula to the position of successor and he became princeps when Tiberius died in AD 37. Drusus the Younger's son Tiberius Gemellus was summoned to Capri by his grandfather Tiberius, where he and Caligula were made joint-heirs. When Caligula assumed power he made Gemellus his adopted son, but Caligula soon had Gemellus killed for plotting against him. According to Philo, Caligula's pretended reason was a conspiracy.

After he became emperor, Caligula took on the role of a dutiful son and brother in a public show of pietas ("piety"). He went out to the islands of Pontia and Pandateria in order to recover the remains of Agrippina and Nero. It was not easy to recover Nero's bones as they were scattered and buried. Moreover, he had a stormy passage; however, the difficulty in his task made his devotion seem even greater. The ashes were brought to Ostia, from where they were carried up the Tiber and brought to the Campus Martius, from where equestrians placed them on briers to join the ashes of Germanicus in the mausoleum of Augustus. The move was reminiscent of when Agrippina carried the ashes of her husband just over 17 years earlier. The large marble block that held Agrippina's cinerary urn still survives; the inscription reads Ossa / Agrippinae M(arci) Agrippae f(iliae) / divi Aug(usti) neptis uxoris / Germanici Caesaris / matris C(ai) Caesaris Aug(usti) / Germanici principis ("The bones of Agrippina, daughter of Marcus Agrippa, granddaughter of Divus Augustus, wife of Germanicus Caesar, mother of the princeps Gaius Caesar Germanicus"). (Note: In the 13th century the block was moved from the Mausoleum of Augustus to the Capitoline hill, where the cavity that held the urn served as an official measure for grain. It is now in the Capitoline Museums (inv. 751 / NCE 2924).)

== Personality ==
Agrippina was fiercely independent, a trait she shared with her mother. Dio described her as having ambitions to match her pedigree. However, Anthony A. Barrett notes that Agrippina was fully aware that a woman in ancient Rome could not hold power in her own right. Instead, Agrippina followed the model of Livia in promoting the careers of her children.

She and her daughter, Agrippina the Younger, are both described as being equally ambitious for their sons. Whereas the elder Agrippina's son failed to become emperor, the younger Agrippina's son, also named Nero, succeeds. In a contrast, Tacitus has Agrippina the Elder merely standing on a bridge waving the soldiers passing by, whereas her daughter eclipses her by presiding over a military tribunal and accepting gifts from foreign ambassadors.

Tacitus also records serious tension between Agrippina and Livia. He describes Livia as having visited "stepmotherly provocations" on Agrippina. He says of Agrippina: "were it not that through her moral integrity and love for her husband she converted an otherwise ungovernable temper to the good" (Tacitus, Annals 1.33). Despite being sympathetic to her as a victim of imperial oppression, he uses expressions like "excitable", "arrogant", "proud", "fierce", "obstinate", and "ambitious" to describe Agrippina. His comments are echoed by other sources.

== Historiography ==
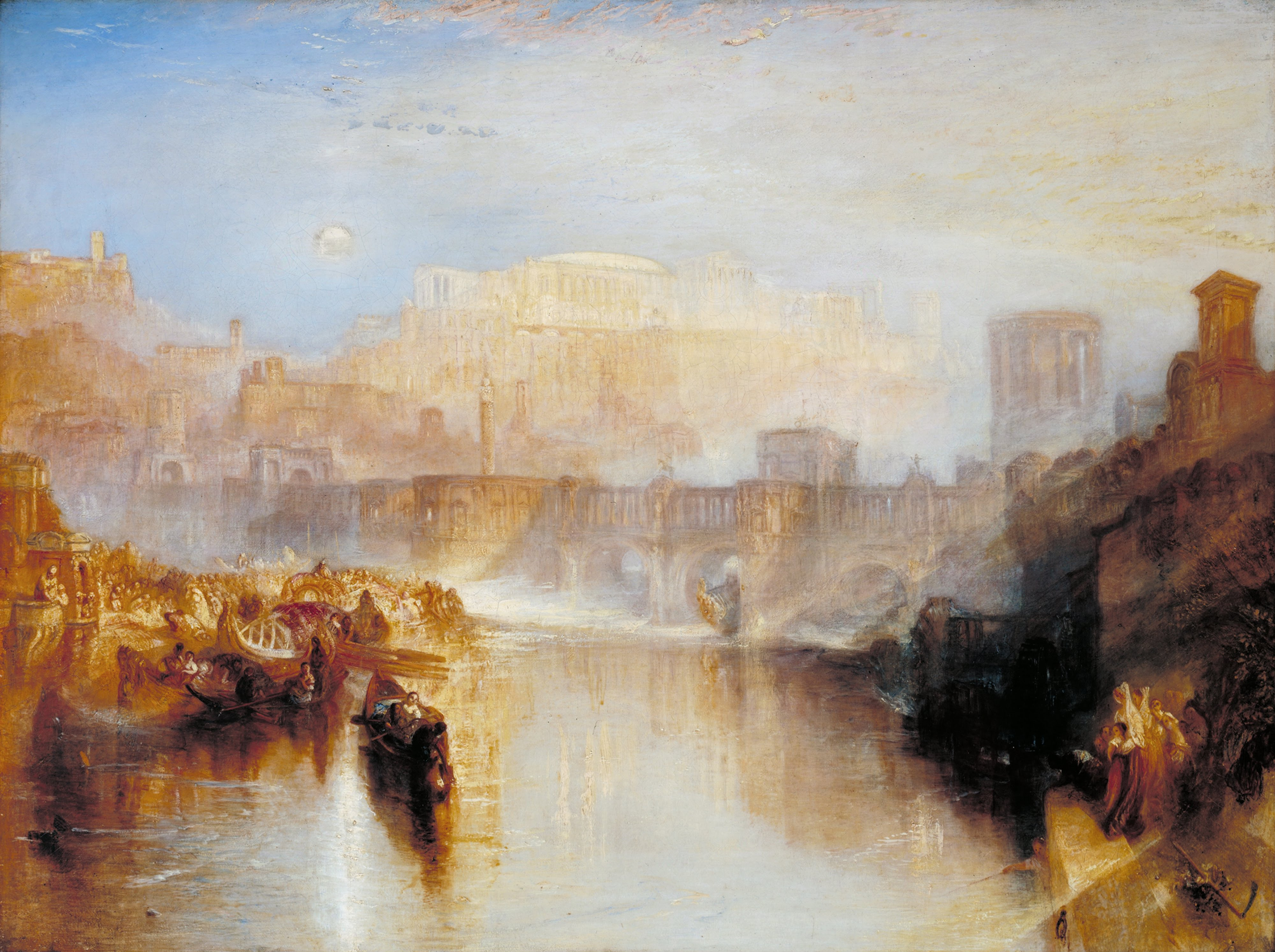
Agrippina Landing with the Ashes of Germanicus by J.M.W. Turner, 1839

Historian Lindsay Powell says Agrippina enjoyed a normal marriage and continued to show her devotion to Germanicus after his death. He says she was regarded by the Roman people as, quoting Tacitus, "the glory of the country, the sole surviving offspring of Augustus, the solitary example of the good old times."

Alston cautions against accepting the stories of Agrippina's feud with Sejanus at face value, as these accounts reflect a tradition hostile to Tiberius and Sejanus. They may have been circulated by Agrippina's supporters or they may have emerged after Sejanus' fall in AD 31. He adds: "These stories are plausible, though not certain to be true."

=== Suetonius ===
Augustus was proud of Agrippina. Suetonius claims that Augustus wrote her a letter praising her intellect and directing her education. Suetonius also records that Augustus, who held strict views on self-restraint and respectable speech, cautioned Agrippina not to speak "offensively". When she next appears, she is being chastised by Tiberius in Greek for making irritating remarks, and the tone of the Greek verse quoted by Tiberius suggests that she should have heeded the advice of her grandfather not to speak offensively.

=== Tacitus ===
The Annals of Tacitus is a history of the Julio-Claudian dynasty beginning with the death of Augustus. In it, he portrays women as having a profound influence on politics. The women of the imperial family in particular are depicted by Tacitus as having a notable prominence in the public sphere as well as possessing a ferocity and ambition with which they pursue it. Tacitus presents them as living longer than the imperial men and thus being more wise as they advance in age. Among the most broad of his portrayals is that of Agrippina. He emphasizes their role in connecting genetically back to Augustus, a significant factor in the marriages of the emperors and princes of the dynasty. The Annals repeatedly has Agrippina competing for influence with Tiberius simply because she is related to Augustus biologically.

Tacitus presents Agrippina as being kindred to aristocratic males, and has her reversing gender roles, which showcases her assumption of male auctoritas ("authority") with metaphors of her dressing and undressing. In an example of Agrippina assuming auctoritas, he says:

Sed femina ingens animi munia ducis per eos dies induit militibusque, ut quis inops aut saucius, vestem et fomenta dilargita est. tradit C. Plinius, Germanicorum bellorum scriptorum, stetisse apud principium po[n]ti[s], laudes et grates reversis legionibus habentum

— Tacitus, 1.69.1
Translation:

But throughout those days, a femina, mighty of spirit, donned the apparel of a dux, and she distributed clothing or bandages to the soldiers, whoever might be needy or suffering. Gaius Plinius, the chronicler of the German wars, relates that she stood at the head of the bridge, offering congratulatory praises to the legions as they returned.

— L'Hoir 2006, pp. 136–7

Using the above epithet, "(femina) ingens animi" ("..[a woman], great for her courage"), he assigns a haughty attitude to Agrippina that compels her to explore the affairs of men. He records her as having reversed the natural order of things when she quelled the mutiny of the Rhine in AD 14. In so doing, he describes her as having usurped her husband's power, a power rightfully belonging only to a general.

== Portraiture ==
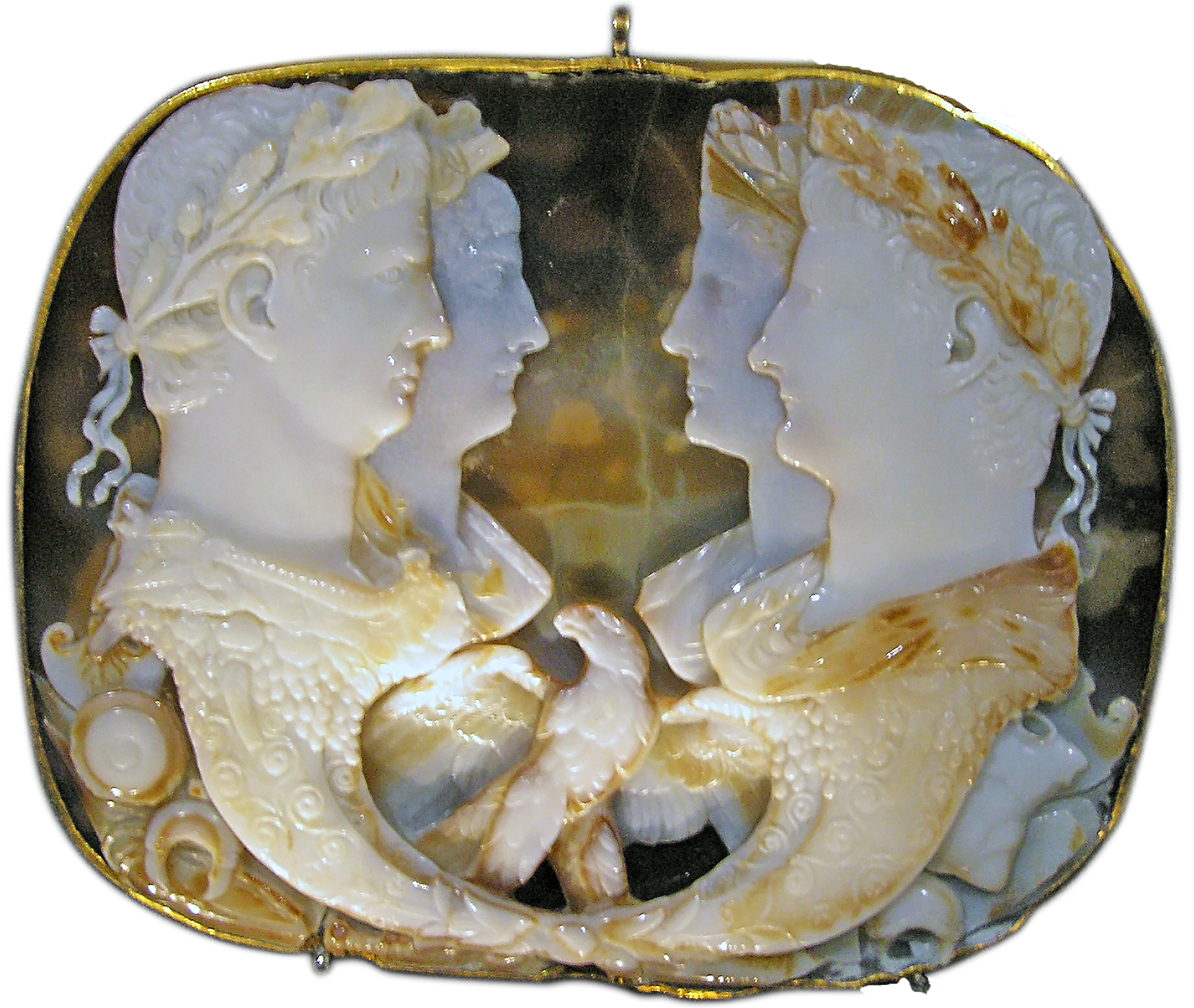
The Gemma Claudia (AD 50) depicting Claudius (front left), Agrippina the Younger (back left), Germanicus (front right), and Agrippina the Elder (back right). (Note: It has also been proposed that the two on the right are Tiberius and Livia; however historian Kleiner notes that Claudius and Agrippina the Younger would probably be paired with another married couple, i.e., pairing them with a mother and son would be an unusual juxtaposition. In addition, if the man on the right were Tiberius, it is unlikely he would be depicted as being so young.)

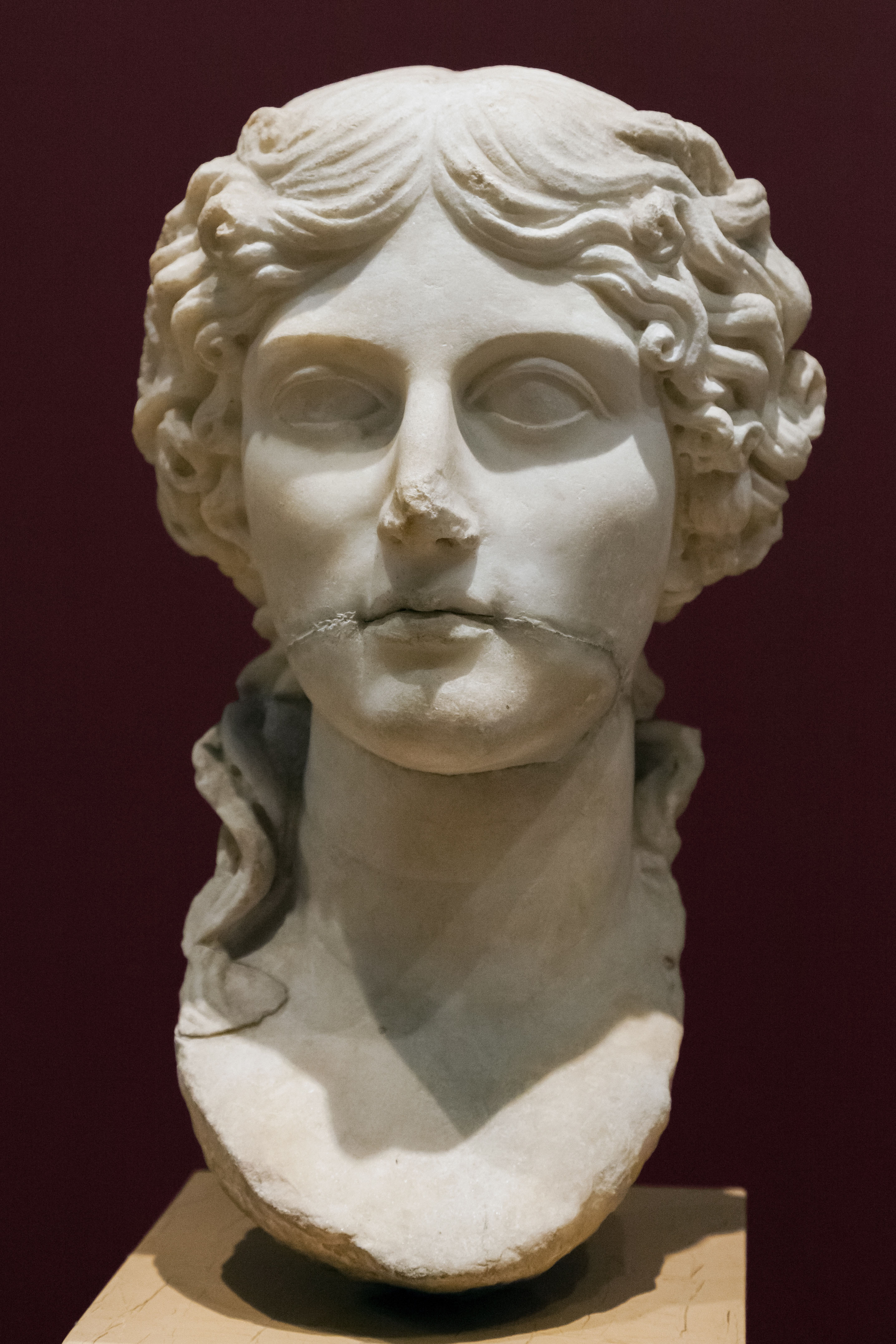
Marble bust, Istanbul Archaeology Museum

Portraits of Roman women from the Julio-Claudian dynasty display a freer hair treatment than those of traditional Roman men and are more keen on the sensitivity of recording on different textures. These changes in style served to make reproducing them more popular in the mid-first-century AD. Reproductions of her image would continue to be made into that period. In the portrait, she is given a youthful face despite the fact that she lived to middle age. Agrippina's hair is a mass of curls that covers both sides of her head and is long going down to her shoulders. Her portraiture can be contrasted with that of Livia who had a more austere Augustan hairstyle.

There are three different periods during the first-century AD when portraits were created for Agrippina: at the time of her marriage to Germanicus (which made her the mother of a potential emperor); when her son Caligula came into power in AD 37, and collected her ashes from the island of Pandateria for relocation to the Mausoleum of Augustus; and at the time of Claudius' marriage to Agrippina the Younger, who wanted to connect himself to the lineage of Augustus by evoking Agrippina's image. Coins and inscriptions cannot act as a method of discerning her age, because her hairstyle remains unchanged in all the representations.

The easiest phase of portraits to identify are those dating to the time of Caligula, when a fair abundance of coins were minted with an image of his mother on them. It is a posthumous portrait of her with idealized features. In the phase following Claudius' marriage, her features are made to more closely resemble those of her daughter. The goal was to strengthen Agrippina the Younger's connection with her mother. Finally, the portraits of her dating to the time of Tiberius are still idealized, but not as much as those from the period of Caligula's reign. Images of Agrippina from this period are the most lifelike.

== Cultural depictions ==
Agrippina is one of the few women from the Roman imperial period whose story was recounted in later centuries as an example of moral character. Her journey to deposit the ashes of her husband was popular with eighteenth century painters, including William Turner, Gavin Hamilton, and Benjamin West whose painting Agrippina Landing at Brundisium with the Ashes of Germanicus (1768) began the trend.

She is also remembered in De Mulieribus Claris, a collection of biographies of historical and mythological women by the Florentine author Giovanni Boccaccio, composed in 1361–62. It is notable as the first collection devoted exclusively to biographies of women in Western literature. Other notable works of which include:

- Agrippina Mourning over the ashes of Germanicus (1775), an etching by Scottish painter Alexander Runciman.
- The Caesars (1968), a television series by Philip Mackie for Granada TV. She was played by Caroline Blakiston.
- I, Claudius (1976), a television series by Jack Pulman for the BBC. She was played by Fiona Walker.

== See also ==
- Julio-Claudian family tree
- Gaius Silius

== Bibliography ==
- Adams, Geoff W. (2007), The Roman Emperor Gaius "Caligula" and His Hellenistic Aspirations, BrownWalker Press, ISBN 9781599424231
- Henry Gardiner Adams, ed. (1857), "Agrippina", A Cyclopaedia of Female Biography: 19, Wikidata Q115393559
- Alston, Richard (1998), Aspects of Roman History AD 14–117, Routledge, ISBN 0-203-20095-0
- Barrett, Anthony A. (2015), Caligula: The Abuse of Power, Routledge, ISBN 978-0-415-65844-7
- Bingham, Sandra J. (1999), The praetorian guard in the political and social life of Julio-Claudian Rome, Ottawa: National Library of Canada, ISBN 0612271064
- Boccaccio, Giovanni (2003), Famous Women, I Tatti Renaissance Library, vol. 1, translated by Virginia Brown, Cambridge, MA: Harvard University Press, ISBN 0-674-01130-9
- Bunson, Matthew (2014), Encyclopedia of the Roman Empire, Infobase Publishing, ISBN 9781438110271
- Dando-Collins, Stephen (2008), Blood of the Caesars: How the Murder of Germanicus Led to the Fall of Rome, Wiley, ISBN 9780470137413
- Davies, Mark Everson; Swain, Hilary (2010), Aspects of Roman History 82BC-AD14: A Source-based Approach, Routledge, ISBN 9781135151607
- Dessau, Hermann; Rohden, Paul von; Klebs, Elimar (1898), Prosopographia imperii romani saec I. II. III., vol. III, apvd Georgivm Reaimervm
- Dunstan, William E. (2010), Ancient Rome, Rowman & Littlefield Publishers, ISBN 9780742568341
- Facos, Michell (2011), An Introduction to Nineteenth-Century Art, Taylor & Francis, ISBN 9781136840715
- Feldherr, Andrew (2009), The Cambridge Companion to the Roman Historians, Oxford University Press, ISBN 9781139827690
- Ferrero, Guglielmo (1911), The Women of the Caesars, Century Company
- Fischer, Julia C. (2016), More Than Mere Playthings: The Minor Arts of Italy, Cambridge Scholars Publishing, ISBN 9781443896498
- Freisenbruch, Annelise (2011), Caesar's Wives: Sex, Power, and Politics in the Roman Empire, Simon and Schuster, ISBN 9781416583059
- Giroire, Cécile; Roger, Daniel (2007), Roman Art from the Louvre, Hudson Hills, ISBN 9781555952839
- Gordon, Arthur A. (1958), Album of Dated Latin Inscriptions I: Rome and the Neighborhood, Augustus to Nerva, Berkeley: University of California Press
- Hawley, Richard; Levick, Barbara (2002), Women in Antiquity: New Assessments, Routledge, ISBN 9781134828906
- Hill, George Francis (1903), Illustrations of school classics, Macmillan and Co.
- Kleiner, Fred S. (2016), A History of Roman Art, Cengage Learning, ISBN 9781305885127
- Levick, Barbara (1999), Tiberius the Politician, Routledge, ISBN 0-415-21753-9
- L'Hoir, Francesca Santoro (2006), Tragedy, Rhetoric, and the Historiography of Tacitus' Annales, University of Michigan Press, ISBN 9780472115198
- Lott, J. Bert (2012), Death and Dynasty in Early Imperial Rome: Key Sources, with Text, Translation, and Commentary, Cambridge University Press, ISBN 978-0-521-86044-4
- MacLachlan, Bonnia (2013), Women in Ancient Rome: A Sourcebook, A&C Black, ISBN 9781441153852
- Mellor, Ronals (1998), The Historians of Ancient Rome, Psychology Press, ISBN 9780415912686
- Newcomb, Horace (1997), Encyclopedia of Television, Routledge, ISBN 978-0-203-93734-1
- Nuorluoto, Tuomo (2021), Roman Female Cognomina: Studies in the Nomenclature of Roman Women (PDF), Department of Linguistics and Philology, Uppsala University, ISBN 9789150628586
- Pagán, Victoria Emma (2012), A Companion to Tacitus, John Wiley & Sons, ISBN 9781444354164
- Pettinger, Andrew (2012), The Republic in Danger: Drusus Libo and the Succession of Tiberius, Oxford University Press, ISBN 9780199601745
- Perry, Gillian; Rossington, Michael (1994), Femininity and Masculinity in Eighteenth-century Art and Culture, Manchester University Press, ISBN 9780719042287
- Phang, Sara E.; Spence, Iain; Kelley, Douglas; Londey, Peter (2016), Conflict in Ancient Greece and Rome: The Definitive Political, Social, and Military Encyclopedia, ABC-CLIO, ISBN 9781610690201
- Powell, Lindsay (2013), Germanicus: The Magnificent Life and Mysterious Death of Rome's Most Popular General, Pen and Sword, ISBN 9781473826922
- Powell, Lindsay (2015), Marcus Agrippa:Right-hand Man of Caesar Augustus, Pen and Sword, ISBN 9781473854017
- Power, Tristan; Gibson, Roy K. (2014), Suetonius the Biographer: Studies in Roman Lives, Oxford University Press, ISBN 9780191018015
- Rowe, Greg (2002), Princes and Political Cultures: The New Tiberian Senatorial Decress, University of Michigan Press, ISBN 0472112309
- Salisbury, Joyce E. (2001), Women in the ancient world, ABC-CLIO, ISBN 978-1-57607-092-5
- Scullard, H. H. (2013), From the Gracchi to Nero: A History of Rome 133 BC to AD 68, Routledge, ISBN 9781136783869
- Southern, Patricia (2013), Augustus, Routledge, ISBN 9781134589562
- Swan, Michael Peter (2004), The Augustan Succession: An Historical Commentary on Cassius Dio's Roman History, Oxford University Press, ISBN 0-19-516774-0
- Wells, Peter S. (2003), The Battle That Stopped Rome, Norton, ISBN 978-0-393-32643-7
- Wood, Susan E. (1999), Imperial Women: A Study in Public Images, 40 B.C. – A.D. 68, Brill Academic Publishers, ISBN 9789004119505
- Zirpolo, Lilian H. (2010), Historical Dictionary of Baroque Art and Architecture, Rowman & Littlefield, ISBN 9780810861558
