= Ancient Rome – Agrippina Landing with the Ashes of Germanicus =

Painting by J. M. W. Turner

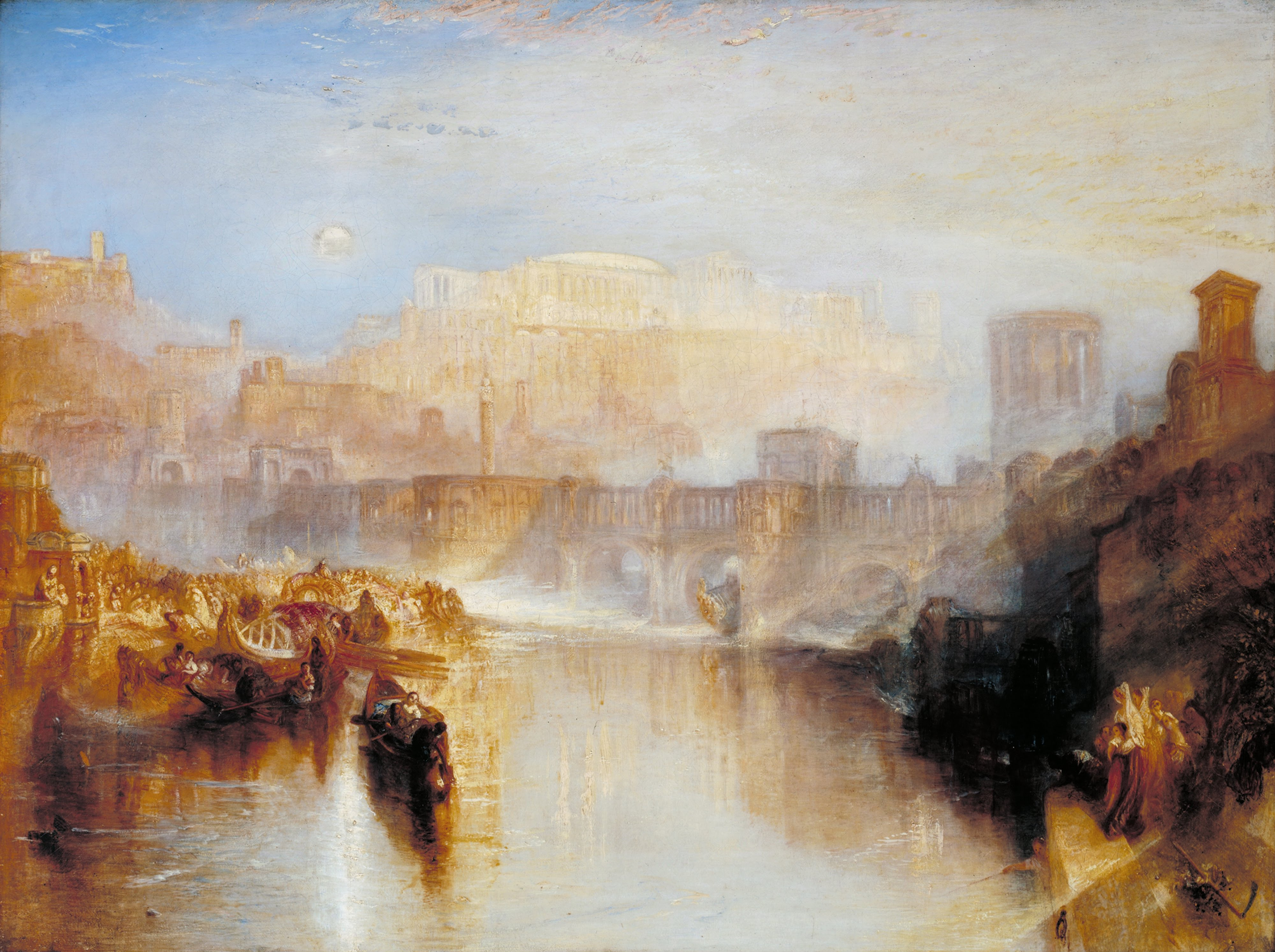
- Artist: J. M. W. Turner
- Year: 1839
- Type: Oil on canvas, historical landscape painting
- Dimensions: 91.4 cm × 121.9 cm (36.0 in × 48.0 in)
- Location: Tate Britain, London
- Website: tate.org.uk/...-n00523

Ancient Rome – Agrippina Landing with the Ashes of Germanicus is an 1839 historical landscape painting by the British artist J.M.W. Turner. It features a scene from the early years of the Roman Empire. The remains of Germanicus, who had died in Antioch, are brought back to Rome his wife Agrippina who is met by a crowd of mourners. Germanicus was the nephew and adopted son of Emperor Tiberius.

Turner often selected classical themes for his landscapes paintings, despite their generally Romantic style. This was produced along with a companion piece Modern Rome – Campo Vaccino.

The painting was featured at the Royal Academy Exhibition of 1839 at the National Gallery in London. In 1851 Turner donated it to the nation as part of the Turner Bequest. It is today part of the collection of the Tate Britain in Pimlico.

== See also ==
- Agrippina Landing at Brundisium with the Ashes of Germanicus, a 1768 painting by Benjamin West.
- List of paintings by J. M. W. Turner

== Bibliography ==
- Bailey, Anthony. J.M.W. Turner: Standing in the Sun. Tate Enterprises Ltd, 2013.
- Costello, Leo. J.M.W. Turner and the Subject of History. Taylor and Francis, 2017.
- Hull, Anthony. English Romanticism. Minerva, 2000.
- Shanes, Eric. The Life and Masterworks of J.M.W. Turner. Parkstone International, 2019.
