= Agrippina Landing at Brundisium with the Ashes of Germanicus =

1768 painting

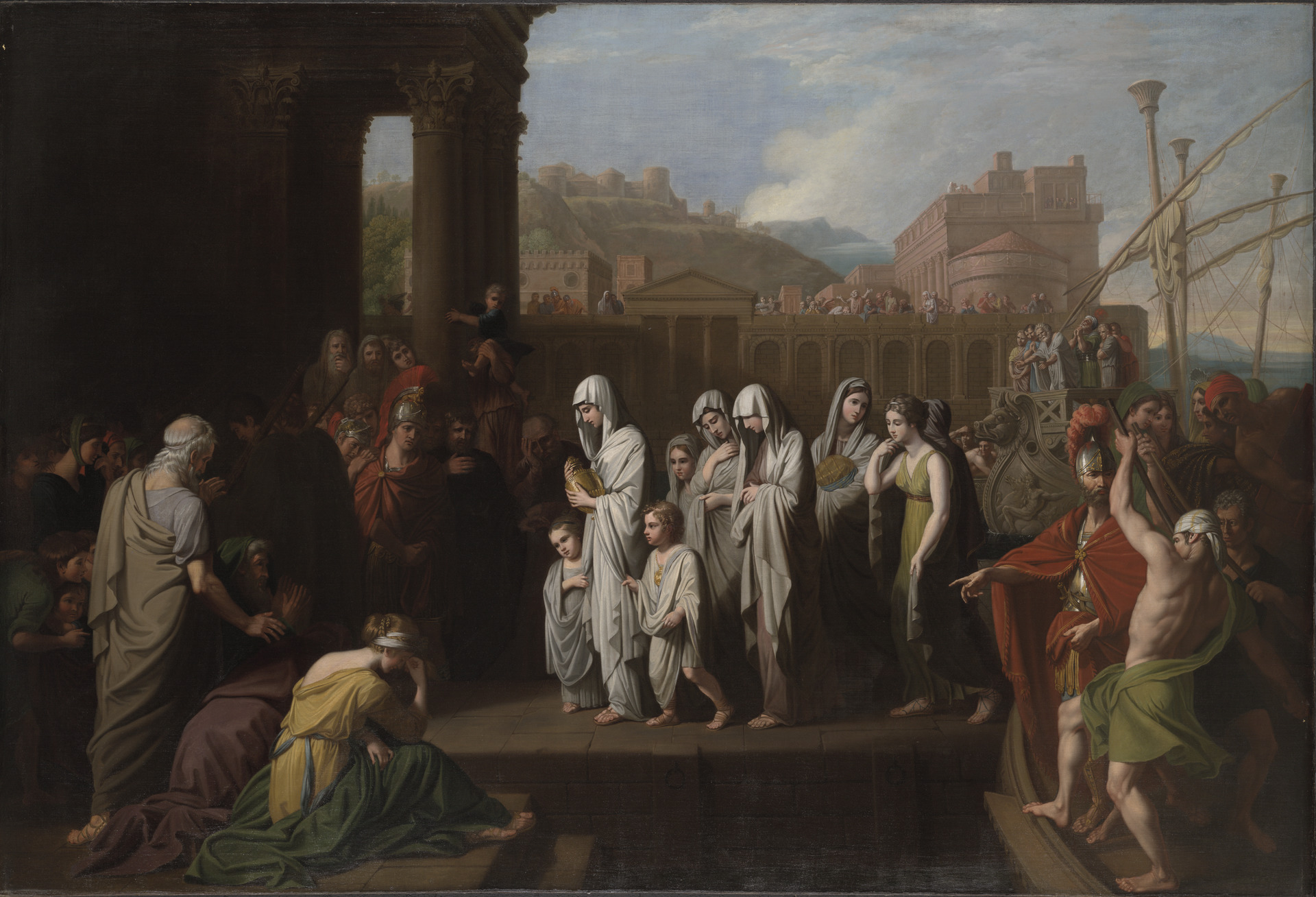
- Artist: Benjamin West
- Year: 1768
- Medium: Oil on canvas
- Dimensions: 164 cm × 240 cm (64.5 in × 94.5 in)
- Location: Yale University Art Gallery; New Haven

Agrippina Landing at Brundisium with the Ashes of Germanicus is a 1768 painting by Anglo-American artist Benjamin West, depicting widow Agrippina the Elder arriving at Brundisium with the ashes of her husband Germanicus to perform the last rites. The likeness of Agrippina and her children are based on the frieze of the Ara Pacis Augustae in which the family is depicted. The temples in the background are inspired by those from the Ruins of the Emperor Diocletian's Palace at Spalato (1764) by Robert Adam.

== Context ==
Germanicus was the intended heir of his adoptive father Tiberius, the second emperor of Rome. He had been sent to look after the eastern provinces of the empire where he came into dispute with Gnaeus Calpurnius Piso, the governor of Syria. Germanicus became ill during the dispute and died on 10 October AD 19 in Antioch. Poison was suspected by many, and a trial was held during which Piso committed suicide.

After Germanicus' cremation in the forum of Antioch, Agrippina personally carried the ashes of her husband to Rome. The transportation of the ashes witnessed national mourning. She landed at the port of Brundisium in southern Italy where she was met with huge crowds of sympathizers; a praetorian escort was provided by the emperor in light of her rank as the wife of a governor-general. As she passed each town, the people and local magistrates came out to show their respect. Drusus the Younger (son of Tiberius), Claudius, and the consuls journeyed to join the procession as well. Once she made it to Rome, her husband's ashes were interred at the Mausoleum of Augustus.

As a famous general, he was widely popular and regarded as the ideal Roman long after his death. Primary sources (incl. Suetonius and Tacitus) often compared him to great men like Alexander the Great and hailed his qualities, contrasting them with the "tyrannical" qualities of Tiberius. Agrippina continued to show devotion to Germanicus after his death. Historian Lindsay Powell says she was regarded by the Roman people as, quoting Tacitus, "the glory of the country, the sole surviving offspring of Augustus, the solitary example of the good old times."

== Description ==
Agrippina Landing in Brundisium with the Ashes of Germanicus is a 64 1/2 x 94 1/2 oil-on-canvas painting. West's painting depicts the events from the beginning of Tacitus' third book as read to him by his client, the Archbishop of York, Dr. Robert Drummond. (Note: Tacitus 3.1 (trans. by Alfred John Church and William Jackson Brodribb, 1876): "WITHOUT pausing in her winter voyage Agrippina arrived at the island of Corcyra, facing the shores of Calabria. There she spent a few days to compose her mind, for she was wild with grief and knew not how to endure. Meanwhile on hearing of her arrival, all her intimate friends and several officers, every one indeed who had served under Germanicus, many strangers too from the neighbouring towns, some thinking it respectful to the emperor, and still more following their example, thronged eagerly to Brundisium, the nearest and safest landing place for a voyager. As soon as the fleet was seen on the horizon, not only the harbour and the adjacent shores, but the city walls too and the roofs and every place which commanded the most distant prospect were filled with crowds of mourners, who incessantly asked one another, whether, when she landed, they were to receive her in silence or with some utterance of emotion. They were not agreed on what befitted the occasion when the fleet slowly approached, its crew, not joyous as is usual, but wearing all a studied expression of grief. When Agrippina descended from the vessel with her two children, clasping the funeral urn, with eyes riveted to the earth, there was one universal groan. You could not distinguish kinsfolk from strangers, or the laments of men from those of women; only the attendants of Agrippina, worn out as they were by long sorrow, were surpassed by the mourners who now met them, fresh in their grief.") She has just arrived in Italy with her children, holding the ashes of her husband the assassinated hero of the Roman Republic. She takes her place in front of the crowd of mourners to lead the procession. Agrippina's likeness is derived from classical friezes found on the Ara Pacis Augustae and other various funeral steles. She was to embody civic virtue and self-restraint.

West meticulously arranges the buildings in the painting's background to recall those of Robert Adam's Ruins of the Palace of the Emperor Diocletian, at Spalato, in Dalmatia, publicized only a few years prior with funding by the Society of Dilettanti. Robert Adam was an archaeologist who visited the site of Diocletian's Palace to study the architecture in-person and recreate it.

== History ==
Dr. Drummond read Tacitus to West over dinner one evening with his own commentary on events, which West depicted in his work. West was enthused for the project as he himself was a neoclassicist. The work was unveiled in 1768 to great approval from King George III. This occurs during a propaganda war in the royal court between members with influence over the king's mother, Princess Augusta, to which the work owes its sudden popularity. Agrippina publicly draws analogies between the grieving widow at Brundisium and the mother of King George III. Agrippina's grief at Brundisium was an obscure story in the history of art before this.

The historical precision of Agrippina impressed King George III enough he commissioned West for a painting himself (The Departure of Regulus from Rome). The work would eventually find a place in the Royal Academy's inaugural exhibition in 1769. West would continue producing paintings for the king over the coming years, numbering some sixty in all.

Agrippina was a renowned model of noble grief in eighteenth-century neoclassical art. Conventions changed going into the Victorian period, however, with more expressive renderings of grief coming into vogue than that established by West.

It was displayed at the Exhibition of 1768 held by the Society of Artists in Spring Gardens. The painting was later gifted to Yale University Art Gallery by Louis M. Rabinowitz where it remains today.

== Sources ==
- Alston, Richard (1998), Aspects of Roman History AD 14–117, Routledge, ISBN 0-203-20095-0
- Barrett, Anthony A. (1993), Caligula: The Corruption of Power, Routledge, ISBN 0-415-21485-8
- Freisenbruch, Annelise (2011), Caesar's Wives: Sex, Power, and Politics in the Roman Empire, Simon and Schuster, ISBN 9781416583059
- Mehl, Andreas (2011), Roman Historiography, translated by Mueller, Hans-Friedrich, Blackwell Publishers, Ltd., ISBN 978-1-4051-2183-5
- Miller, John; Woodman, Anthony (2010), Latin Historiography and Poetry in the Early Empire: Generic Interactions, Brill, ISBN 978-90-04-17755-0
- Powell, Lindsay (2015), Marcus Agrippa:Right-hand Man of Caesar Augustus, Pen and Sword, ISBN 9781473854017
- Lubin, David M.; et al. (1994), Picturing a Nation: Art and Social Change in Nineteenth-century America, Yale University Press, ISBN 9780300057324
- Smith, Anthony D. (2013), The Nation Made Real: Art and National Identity in Western Europe, 1600-1850, OUP Oxford, ISBN 9780199662975
- Wagner, Christoph (2011), Pictorial Cultures and Political Iconographies: Approaches, Perspectives, Case Studies from Europe and America, Walter de Gruyter, ISBN 9783110237863
- Wood, Susan E. (1999), Imperial Women: A Study in Public Images, 40 B.C. – A.D. 68, Brill Academic Publishers, ISBN 9789004119505
