= Joanne Grant =

American journalist (1930–2005)

- Born: March 30, 1930; Utica, New York, U.S.
- Died: January 9, 2005 (aged 74); Manhattan, New York, U.S.
- Education: Syracuse University (BA)
- Occupations: Journalist, activist
- Political party: Communist Party USA
- Spouse: Victor Rabinowitz (m. 1967)
- Children: 2
- Relatives: Louis M. Rabinowitz (father-in-law)

Joanne Grant (March 30, 1930 – January 9, 2005) was an African-American journalist and Communist activist. She was a reporter for the National Guardian, where she covered the American Civil Rights Movement in the American South in the 1960s. She was the author of three books about the era and the director of a documentary about Ella Baker. Her 1968 book, Black Protest, is "required reading" for African-American studies classes.

== Early life ==
Joanne Grant was born on March 30, 1930, in Utica, New York. Her father was white and her mother was mixed race. As a result, she was light-skinned.

Grant graduated from Syracuse University, with a bachelor's degree in journalism.

== Career ==
Grant began her career in public relations in New York City. Meanwhile, she attended the 6th World Festival of Youth and Students in Moscow, Soviet Union in 1957, alongside 140 other Americans. She also visited China alongside 56 other Americans, even though US citizens were not allowed to visit the communist nation at the time. She also visited India, Africa and Cuba. Upon her return to New York City, she served as an assistant to civil rights leader W. E. B. Du Bois. On February 3, 1960, she was named before the House Un-American Activities Committee as a member of the Communist Party USA. Grant was involved in the Fair Play for Cuba Committee.

Grant became a reporter for the National Guardian, a radical leftist newspaper, in the 1960s. She covered the American Civil Rights Movement, and she wrote about her encounters with blacks in small towns across Alabama, Mississippi and Georgia. She wrote about lynching in the American South. Meanwhile, she became a member of the Student Nonviolent Coordinating Committee.

Grant served as the news director of WBAI, a left-wing radio station, in 1965. She wrote, directed and produced Fundi: The Story of Ella Baker, a documentary about civil rights leader Ella Baker, in 1981. Actor Harry Belafonte was the narrator; the film was shown on PBS and at the London Film Festival.

Grant was the author of three books about the Civil Rights Movement. The first book, Black Protest, was published in 1968. According to The Los Angeles Times, it was "required reading in many African American history classes" by 2005. Her second book, Confrontation on Campus, was published in 1969. It was about the Columbia University protests of 1968. Her third book, Ella Baker: Freedom Bound, was a biography of Ella Baker.

== Personal life and death ==
Grant married Victor Rabinowitz, co-founder of the National Lawyers Guild, in 1967. They had a son, Mark, and a daughter, Abby.

Grant died on January 9, 2005, in Manhattan, New York City. She was 74 years old. Her papers are held at the Columbia University Library and The Ohio State University's Rare Books & Manuscripts Library.

== Works ==
- Black Protest: History, Documents, And Analysis 1619 To The Present. Greenwich, Connecticut: Fawcett Publications. 1968. OCLC 424043.
- Confrontation on Campus: The Columbia Pattern for the New Protest. New York: New American Library. 1969. OCLC 32244.
- Ella Baker: Freedom Bound. New York: Wiley & Sons. 1998. ISBN 9780585270197. OCLC 45728915.
