= Louis M. Rabinowitz =

American philanthropist (1887–1957)

Louis Mayer Rabinowitz
- Born: October 16, 1887; Raseiniai, Lithuania
- Died: April 27, 1957 (aged 69); New York City, U.S.
- Occupations: Businessman, philanthropist
- Spouse: Rose Netter Rabinowitz
- Children: 2, including Victor Rabinowitz
- Relatives: Joanne Grant (daughter-in-law)

Louis M. Rabinowitz (1887–1957) was an American businessman, philanthropist and art collector. Born in Lithuania (then part of the Russian Empire), he emigrated to the United States, where he founded a manufacturing company and became a millionaire. He established endowments at Yale University and the Hebrew University of Jerusalem. He funded Nelson Glueck's archaeological trips to the Negev of Israel. His art collection is held posthumously at the Yale University Art Gallery.

== Background ==
Louis M. Rabinowitz was born on October 16, 1887, in Rosanne (Raseiniai), now Lithuania. He emigrated to the United States in 1901, at the age of 14.

== Career ==
Upon his arrival, Rabinowitz worked menial jobs and learned English by reading books in the Cooper Union library.

He founded L.M. Rabinowitz & Co., a corset manufacturing company based in Brooklyn, New York City. He served as its chairman. He sold it to Holland Furnace Co., a Holland, Michigan-based home furnace company, for US$2 million in 1966.

Rabinowitz served on the board of directors of the Municipal Bank of Brooklyn.

== Philanthropy ==
Rabinowitz established the Rabinowitz Fund for Judaica Research at Yale University. He also endowed the chair in Semitic Languages and Literature at Yale; it was held by Franz Rosenthal. He received an honorary Doctorate of Humane Letters from the Jewish Theological Seminary of America. He also received a citation from National Jewish Welfare Board for his support of Jewish literature in 1956.

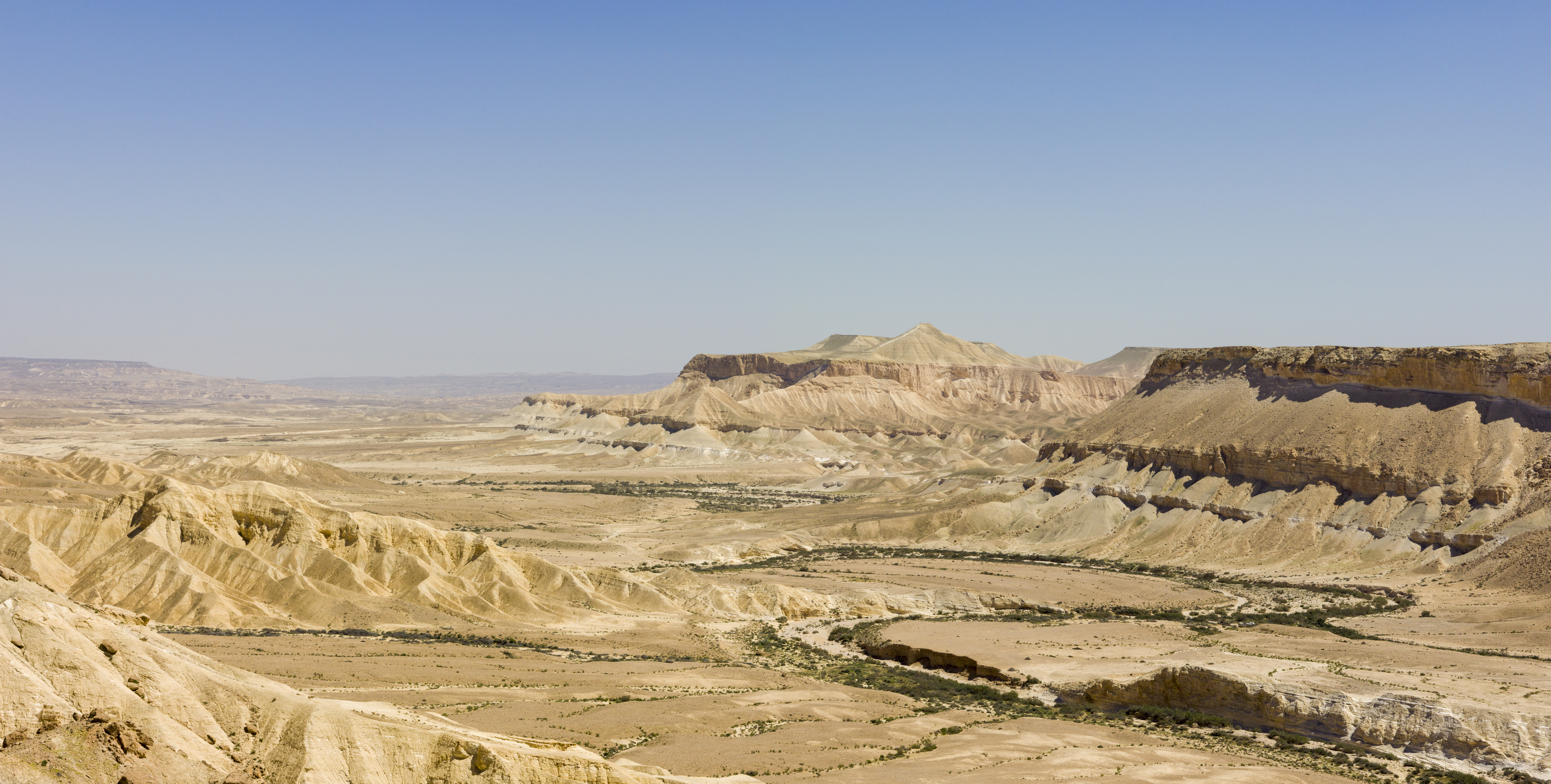
The Negev in Israel, where Rabinowitz sponsored archeological trips in the 1950s.

Rabinowitz donated US$50,000 to the Hebrew University of Jerusalem for the research of synagogues in the Near East in 1949. This led to the exploration of ancient synagogues in Caesarea, Yafa an-Naseriyye, Sha'alvim and other places in Israel. He also funded a trip to Syria, which led to the exploration of the Dura-Europos synagogue.

Rabinowitz served on the board of trustees of the American Schools of Oriental Research from 1949 to 1957. He funded Nelson Glueck's archaeological trips to the Negev in 1952, 1953, and 1954, where many ancient Jewish sites were found.

== Personal life and death ==
Rabinowitz had a wife, Rose, a son, Victor, who became a lawyer and a daughter, Lucille. His daughter-in-law, Joanne Grant, was a journalist and Civil Rights activist.

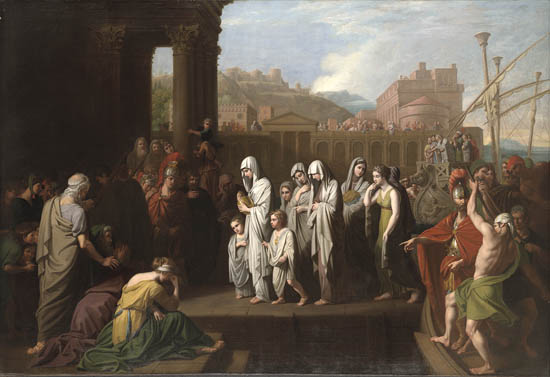
Benjamin West, Agrippina Landing at Brundisium with the Ashes of Germanicus (1768), formerly owned by Rabinowitz.

Rabinowitz was an art and antique book collector. For example, he owned four First Folios. He also owned paintings by Benjamin West, like his 1768 Agrippina Landing at Brundisium with the Ashes of Germanicus, later donated to the Yale University Art Gallery.

Rabinowitz died on April 27, 1957, in New York City. He was 69 years old. By December 1957, the Yale University Library established the Louis M. Rabinowitz Memorial Fund in his honor.

== Legacy ==
The Louis M. Rabinowitz Foundation was chaired by his son Victor Rabinowitz posthumously. A 1967 file from the Federal Bureau of Investigation showed that it supported Civil Rights leader Floyd McKissick.

== See also ==
- Louis M. Rabinowitz Foundation
- Victor Rabinowitz
