= Richard Alston (classicist) =

English academic (born 1965)

Richard Alston (born 4 April 1965) is professor of Roman history at Royal Holloway, University of London. Alston's research is in the area of "Roman imperialism, the Roman and Byzantine city, issues of individuality in the early Roman empire, and the relationship between modern and ancient political ideologies."

== Selected publications ==
- Aspects of Roman History: AD 14 - 117, Routledge, 1998.
- The City in Roman and Byzantine Egypt, London, New York: Routledge, 2002.
- Feeding the Ancient City, Alston, R. & van Nijf, O. (ed.) 2008 Peeters. (The Greek City in the Post-Classical Age)
- Reading Ancient Slavery, Alston, R., Hall, E. & Proffitt, L. (ed.) 2010 Duckworth.
- Ancient Slavery and Abolition: From Hobbes to Hollywood, Alston R., Hall, E. & McConnell, J. (ed.) 2011 Oxford University Press.
- Political Culture in the Greek City after the Classical Age, Alston, R. & van Nijf, O. (ed.) 2011 Peeters.
- Reflections of Romanity: Discourses of Subjectivity in Imperial Rome, Alston, R. & Spentzou, E. 2011 The Ohio State University Press.
- Aspects of Roman History 31 BC - AD 117, London, New York: Routledge, 2014.
- Rome's Revolution: Death of the Republic and Birth of the Empire, Alston R. New York, Oxford: Oxford University Press, 2015.
- Classicism and the Construction of Capital Cities: London, Athens and Rome in the Nineteenth Century, Bloomsbury Academic, 2025.
