= Capitoline Museums =

Museum in Rome, Italy

- Musei Capitolini
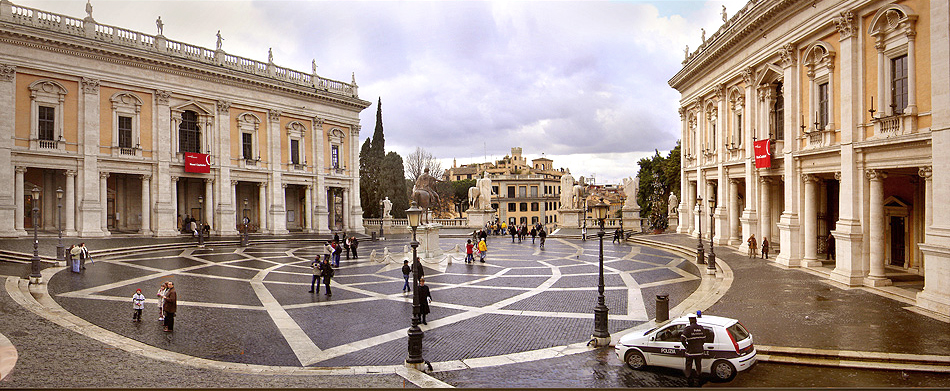
- The Capitoline Museums and the trapezoidal central Piazza del Campidoglio in 2007
- Click on the map for a fullscreen view
- Established: 1734 open to public, 1471 bronzes donated by Pope Sixtus IV to the people of Rome
- Location: Capitoline Hill; Piazza del Campidoglio 1, 00186 Rome, Italy
- Coordinates: 41°53′35″N 12°28′58″E
- Type: Archaeology, art museum, historic site
- Director: Claudio Parisi Presicce
- Website: museicapitolini.org

The Capitoline Museums (Italian: Musei Capitolini) are a group of art and archaeological museums located on the Capitoline Hill in Rome, Italy, and constitute the main civic museum complex of the city. Their principal buildings are the Palazzo dei Conservatori and the Palazzo Nuovo, which face each other across Piazza del Campidoglio, the square designed by Michelangelo in 1536 and completed over the course of the following centuries.

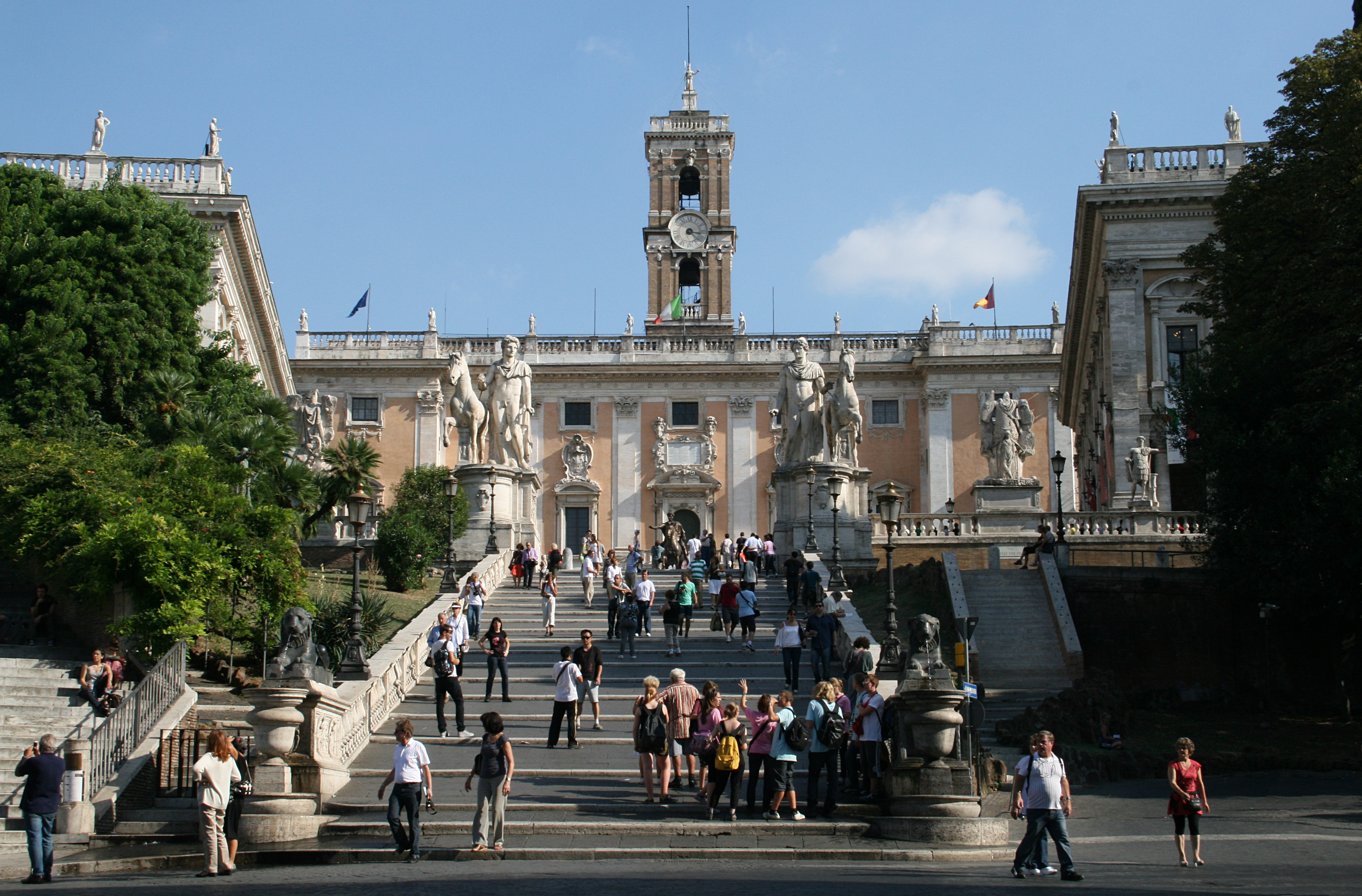
The monumental Cordonata with the Dioscuri, which allow access to the Campidoglio

The museums are primarily dedicated to the art and history of ancient Rome, with a particular emphasis on Roman sculpture. The collection include celebrated works such as the Equestrian Statue of Marcus Aurelius, the Capitoline Wolf and the Dying Gaul, alongside inscriptions, coins, and other artifacts illustrating the civic and religious life of the city. The museums also include Renaissance and Baroque paintings, as well as the richly frescoed walls of the Conservators' Apartment in the Palazzo dei Conservatori, which depict scenes from Rome's early history.

The Capitoline Museums traces the collection's origins to 1471, when Pope Sixtus IV donated to the people of Rome a collection of ancient bronzes from the Lateran. In 1734 Pope Clement XII opened the museum to the public, making them among the earliest museums in the world accessible to all citizens. Today, the Capitoline Museums continue to attract visitors from around the world, hosting temporary exhibitions alongside their permanent collections and serving as a major cultural landmark in Rome.

== History ==
=== 15th century ===
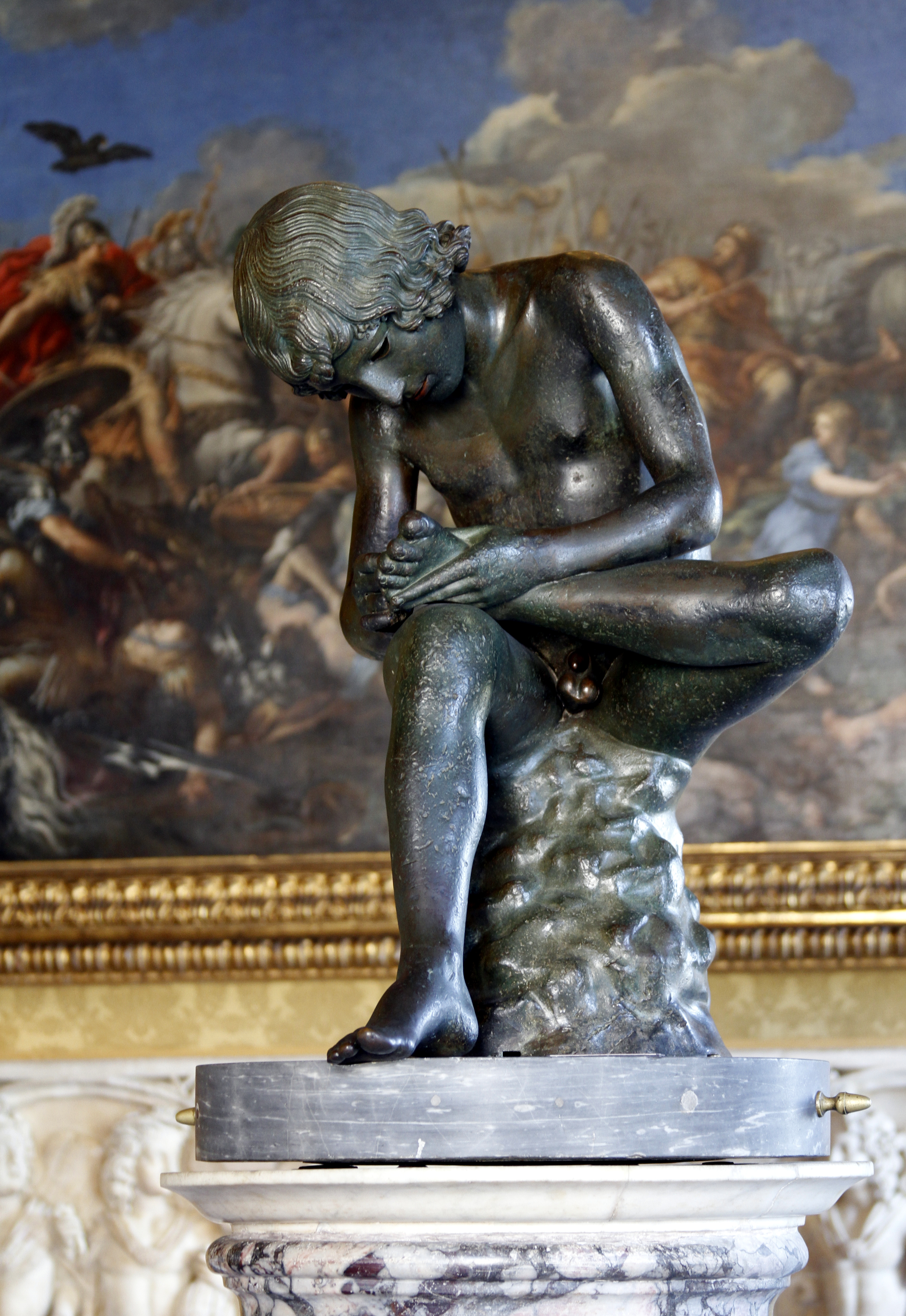
The Boy with Thorn, The oldest version of the bronze statue. 1st–3rd century BC.

The history of the museum can be traced to 1471, when Pope Sixtus IV donated a collection of important ancient bronzes to the people of Rome, until then kept in the Lateran Palace and donated to the Roman people: the Capitoline Wolf, the Camillus (statue), the Boy with Thorn and two fragments of a colossal statue of Domitian (the head and a hand holding a globe). As the inscription preserved in the Palazzo dei Conservatori specifies, it is not a donation but a "restitution": «he judged that these remarkable bronze statues, testimony to the ancient greatness of the Roman people who had them made, had to be returned and donated without reservations» : these works of art had constituted the thesaurus Romanitatis, representing a sort of heritage of the ancient world that the Church had collected and jealously guarded throughout the Middle Ages.

Sixtus IV chose to house the bronzes on the Capitoline Hill, then dominated by the ancient Palazzo Senatorio, also built on the remains of the Tabularium, home of the Roman archives. The Wolf is placed on the facade of the Palazzo dei Conservatori and becomes the symbol of Rome, replacing the group of the Lion slaughtering a horse, present until then, symbol of the legal functions of the senatorial authority and the only sculpture present on the Capitoline Hill before the donation of Sixtus IV. This donation symbolizes the continuity between imperial Rome and the temporal power of the Church, affirming the predominance of papal power on the Capitoline Hill, making this ancient hill the very symbol of the historical memory of Rome, in contrast to the role of driving force of civil autonomy that the Capitoline magistrates later strenuously defended.

=== 16th century ===
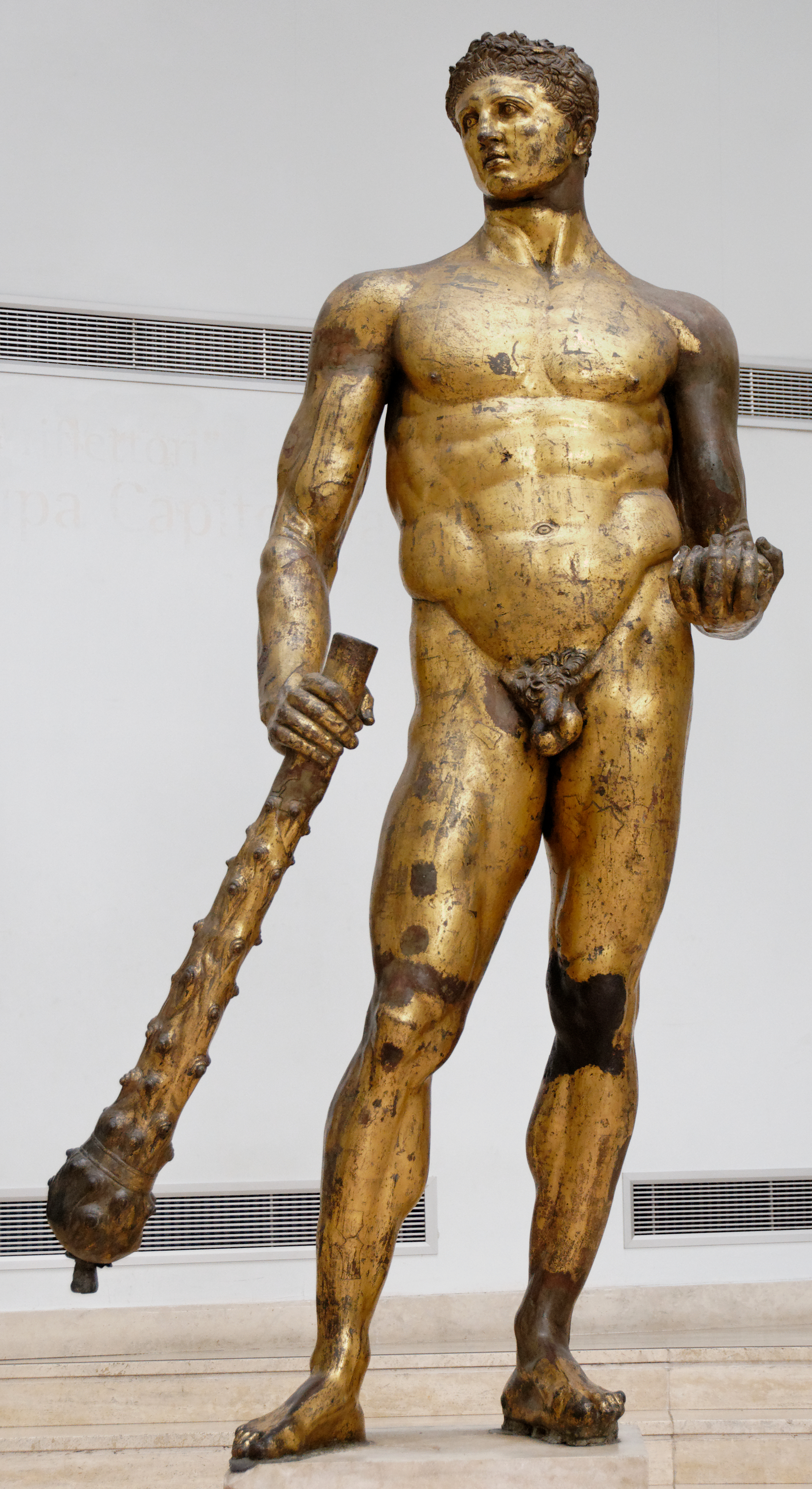
Hercules of the Forum Boarium; 2nd century BC, height: 241 cm

The collection of antiquities was enriched over time by donations from various popes who increased the museum's collections. Between the end of the 15th century and the middle of the 16th century, important ancient sculptures, piled up in front of the Palazzo dei Conservatori, of immense historical and artistic value, flowed into the Campidoglio, confirming the role of the hill as a public museum of antiquities. Thus the gilded Hercules, found in the Forum Boarium at the time of Sixtus IV, quickly joined the original group of bronzes. Purchased by the conservators, it was placed on a high plinth in front of their palace as a "monument to the glory of Rome", before being moved to the courtyard, where it was represented by Maarten van Heemskerck (1532–1537), then transferred inside the palace to the apartment of the Conservators.

In 1513, two colossal statues of river gods, found in the Baths of Constantine (Rome) at the Quirinale, were placed next to the entrance to the palace: these sculptures from the era of Trajan were added in 1588–1589, to those that already decorated the monumental staircase leading to the Palazzo Senatorio.

In 1515, three large high-relief panels depicting scenes from the life of Marcus Aurelius were purchased. They belonged to the sculptural decoration of an honorary monument erected to this emperor on the occasion of his triumph in 176 AD. Complete expressions of sculpture with a historical subject in Roman art, they serve to underline the ideal continuity between the ancient world and the Renaissance in the Campidoglio. As early as 1523, the Venetian ambassadors defined the Capitoline collections as "the most beautiful and most famous in the world".

In 1541, on the main facade of the courtyard, in a niche overlooking the entrance, a large statue of Athena was installed, discovered and donated to the civil magistracy at the time of Paul III. It was used under Sixtus V as a central element of the decoration of the grand staircase of the senatorial palace designed by Michelangelo. Michelangelo, according to the testimony of Onofrio Panvinio, contributed himself to the recomposition of the fragments found and to their architectural presentation in the Campidoglio: the Fasti Capitolini, transferred in 1583 from the current room of the Louvre, were then recomposed according to the artist's design while undergoing, on this occasion, profound modifications.

In 1566, Pius V donated a lot of thirty statues from the Palazzo del Belvedere (Vatican), considering it inappropriate for the successor of Peter (apostle) to keep pagan idols in his home. A considerable number of works of art thus arrived at the Campidoglio, where they enriched the "statuario", subsequently transferred to the ground floor of the Palazzo dei Conservatori. Some statues are placed on the former bell tower of Palazzo Senatorio and on the facade of the same building, thus realizing Michelangelo's project, as documented by the engravings of Étienne Dupérac. In the second half of the century the collections included the two statues of Julius Caesar and Navarch, the Capitoline Brutus and the Lex de imperio Vespasiani.

=== 18th century ===
The museum was opened to the public at the request of Pope Clement XII in 1734, making it the oldest public museum in the world, understood as a place where art could be enjoyed by all and not only by the owners.

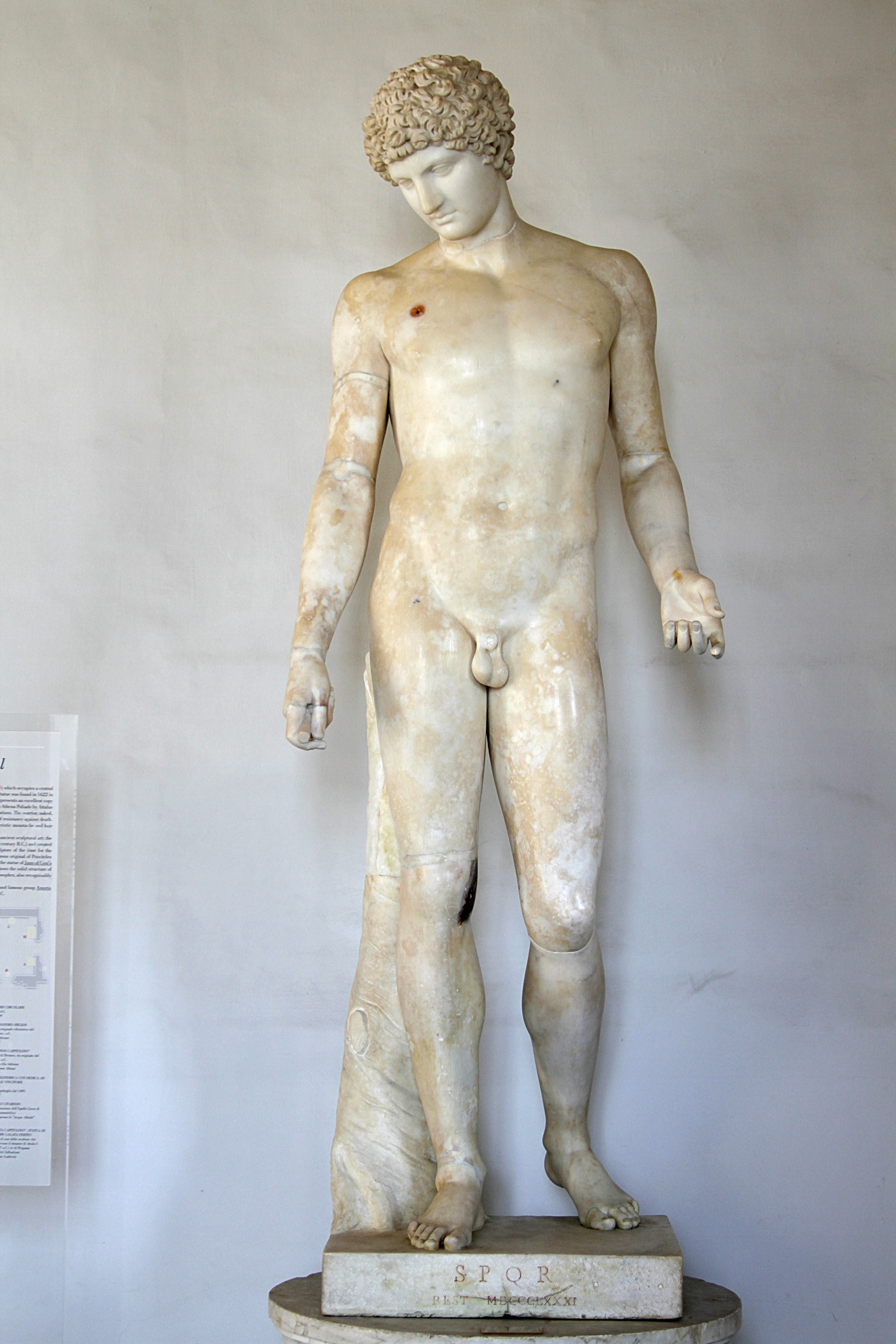
The Capitoline Antinous, Palazzo Nuovo, 2nd century AD

The enrichment of the collections resumed in the 18th century. In 1714 Pope Clement XI (1700–1721) donated to the museum five Egyptian statues found near the Porta Salaria. In 1733, under Pope Clement XII (1730–1740), the museum purchased the collection of Cardinal Alessandro Albani, including important pieces such as the Satyrs of the Valley, the Juno Cesi and a statue of Antinous found in Hadrian's Villa, but also a series of portraits preserved today in the Hall of Emperors and Philosophers.

The end of the eighteenth century was not favorable to the museum: the foundation of the Pio-Clementino museum in the Vatican Museums revived the competition between the municipal and papal collections. This caused an abrupt halt in the growth of the Capitoline archaeological collections: the attention of the pontiff was therefore entirely absorbed by this new museum. In 1797 Napoleon Bonaparte imposed the Treaty of Tolentino which provided for the transfer of some of the most famous pieces to the Louvre Museum. Antonio Canova, delegated by the Holy Father for the so-called "recoveries", remedied the Napoleonic spoliations through obstinacy (or more probably the clauses of the Congress of Vienna), reported in 1815 after the fall of Napoleon the Boy with Thorn, the Capitoline Brutus, the Dying Gaul and other works. Some, however, such as the Sarcophagus of the Muses, already in the museums of the Campidoglio through the Albani collection, remain in the Louvre.

=== 19th and 20th century ===
Pope Gregory XVI assigned the administration of the museums to the Roman city authorities in 1838.

The transfer of the capital of the new Kingdom of Italy to Rome in 1870 and the events of the end of the century marked a fundamental stage in the life and development of the city that led to the transformation and expansion of the museums of the Campidoglio.

The collections were reorganized in 1903 by Rodolfo Lanciani according to more rigorous museographic criteria, further highlighting the archaeological context of the works. The works are distributed in the rooms according to their original context, favoring a more careful reading of the archaeological data rather than an inspirational vision more linked to the aesthetic value of the sculptures as masterpieces of ancient art.

=== Treaties of Rome of 1957 ===
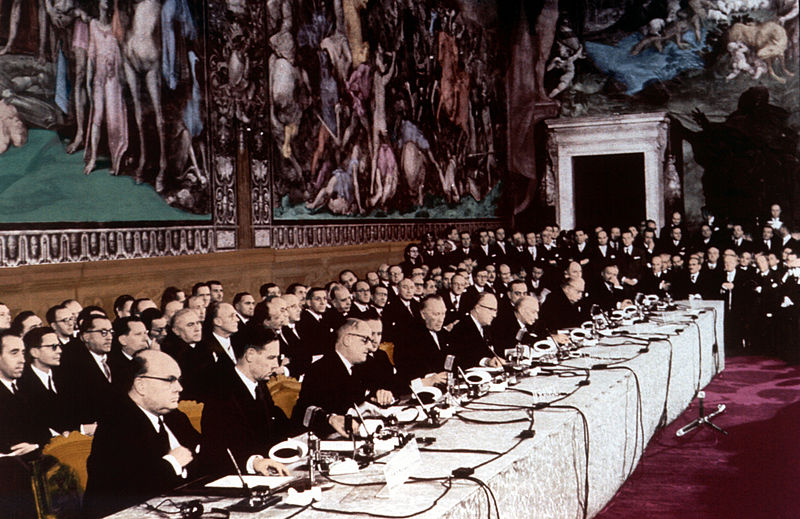
The moment of the signing of the Treaties of Rome, in the Hall of the Horatii and Curiatii of the Palazzo dei Conservatori.

The Capitoline Museums and in particular the Palazzo dei Conservatori are remembered as the place where the Treaties of Rome were signed, which established the European Economic Community, the precursor of today's European Union. The six states that were already members of the European Coal and Steel Community took part in it, namely Belgium, France, West Germany, Italy, Luxembourg and the Netherlands, which, after the success of this latter treaty, decided to expand their cooperation agreements to other sectors. To this day, they are among the most important documents in the history of the European Union.

=== 21st century ===
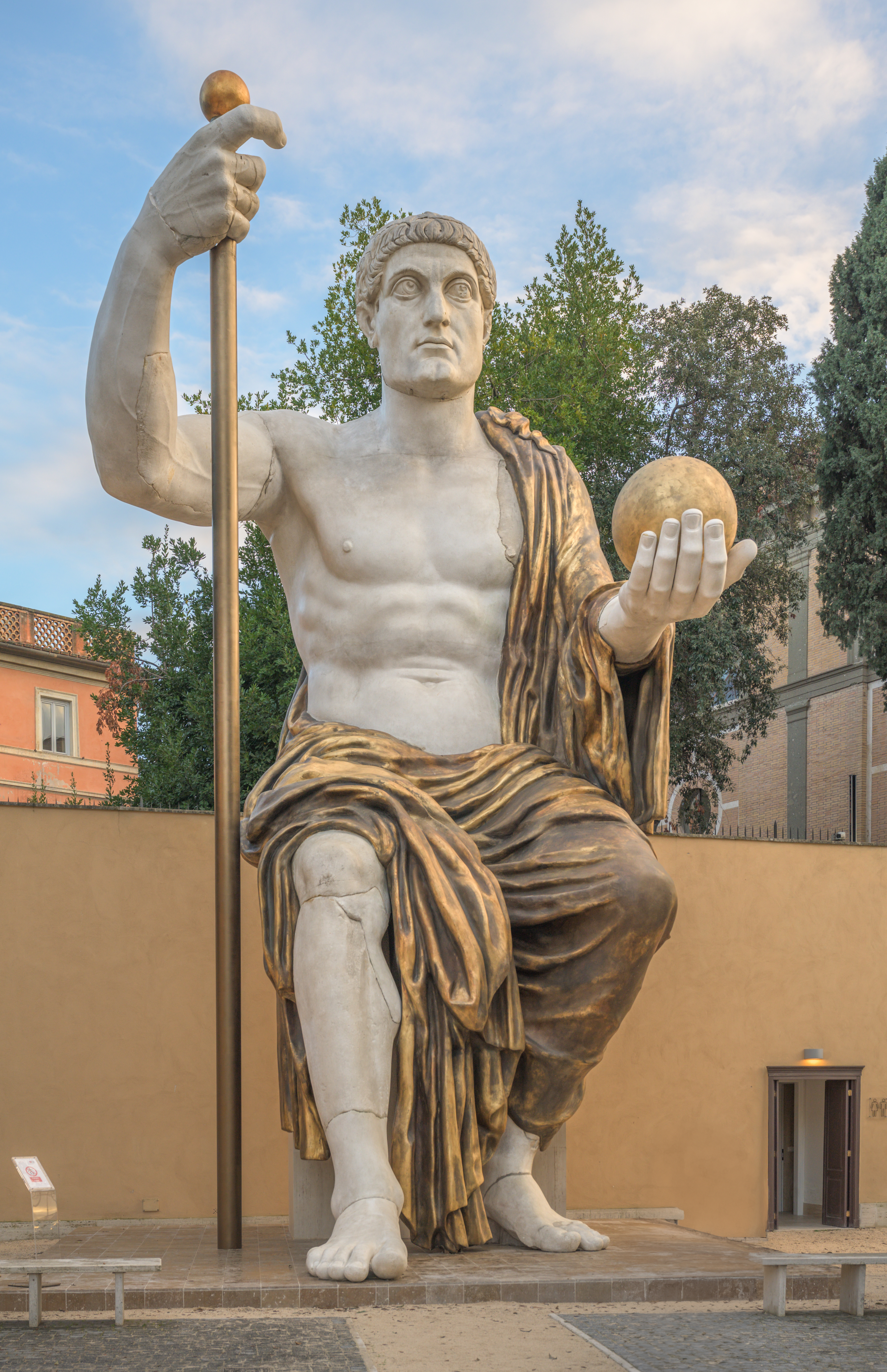
Colossus of Constantine full-scale reconstruction in the gardens of Villa Caffarelli.

In 1997, a branch was opened in the former Centrale Montemartini, a former thermoelectric factory in the Ostiense district, creating an original solution of fusion between industrial and classical archaeology. Its rooms allow in particular to present the grandiose remains of the Temple of Jupiter Capitolinus and the architectural complex of the temple of Apollo Sosianus with a monumental character. In 2005, a new wing of the museum, called the Exedra of Marcus Aurelius, was added. Today, the Capitoline Museums are part of the Civic Museums system of Rome. Finally, at the beginning of the 21st century, the "Grand Capitole" project led to the redevelopment of a large part of the Palazzo dei Conservatori.

In 2016, the museum enclosed several of its nude statues in white-colored wooden panels ahead of a meeting between Iranian president Hassan Rouhani and Italian Prime Minister Matteo Renzi that it hosted. The move was criticized by Italian Culture Minister Dario Franceschini as "incomprehensible," while the museum said that it had done so following a request from the prime minister's office, although Franceschini said that the government had not been informed of the matter in advance. Rouhani also denied asking Italian officials to cover up the artefacts but expressed his thanks to his hosts for making his visit "as pleasant as possible".

On 6 February 2024, a full-scale (1:1) reconstruction of the Colossus of Constantine was installed in the gardens of Villa Caffarelli. The reconstructed statue of Constantine the Great, approximately 13 m (42 ft 8 in) in height, was produced by the Factum Foundation for Digital Technology in Preservation, in collaboration with Fondazione Prada, based on technical analysis of the original fragments preserved in the courtyard of the Palazzo dei Conservatori supported by literary and epigraphic sources.

== Collection ==
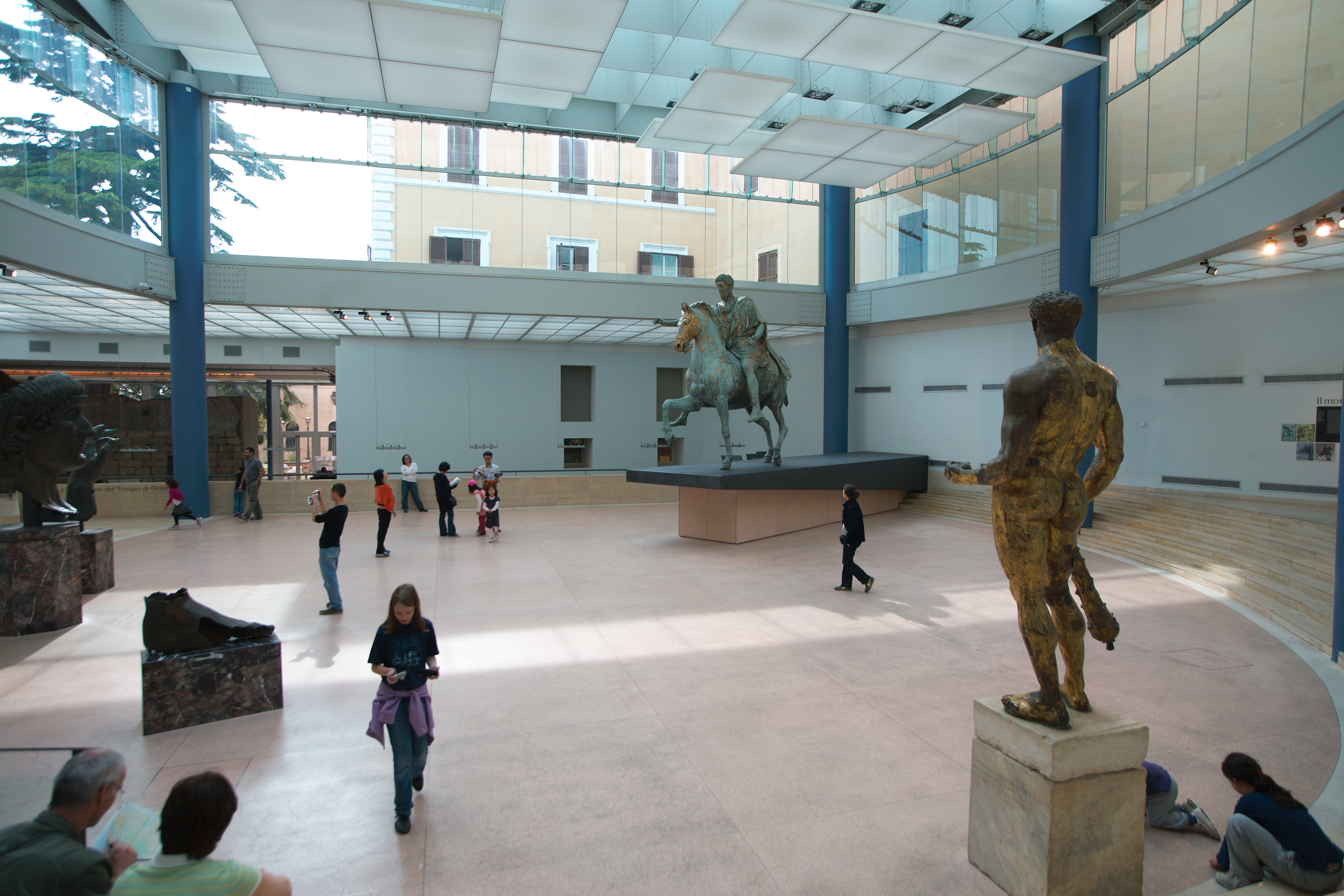
Hall of the Exedra of Marcus Aurelius, Palazzo dei Conservatori, the most popular attraction in the museum

The Capitoline Collection is the oldest public collection in the world, covering an exhibition area of 12,997 m^{2} (139,900 sq ft).

Among the most famous sculptures kept in the Capitoline Museums is the Equestrian Statue of Marcus Aurelius, originally located in the center of Piazza del Campidoglio and transferred to the museums in 1990, in a specially set up glass room: the Exedra of Marcus Aurelius, which is located where the Roman Garden used to be, between Palazzo dei Conservatori and Palazzo Caffarelli. In the center of the square, in 1996, the statue of Marcus Aurelius was replaced by a copy, perfectly compliant in terms of volumes but not in terms of gilding.

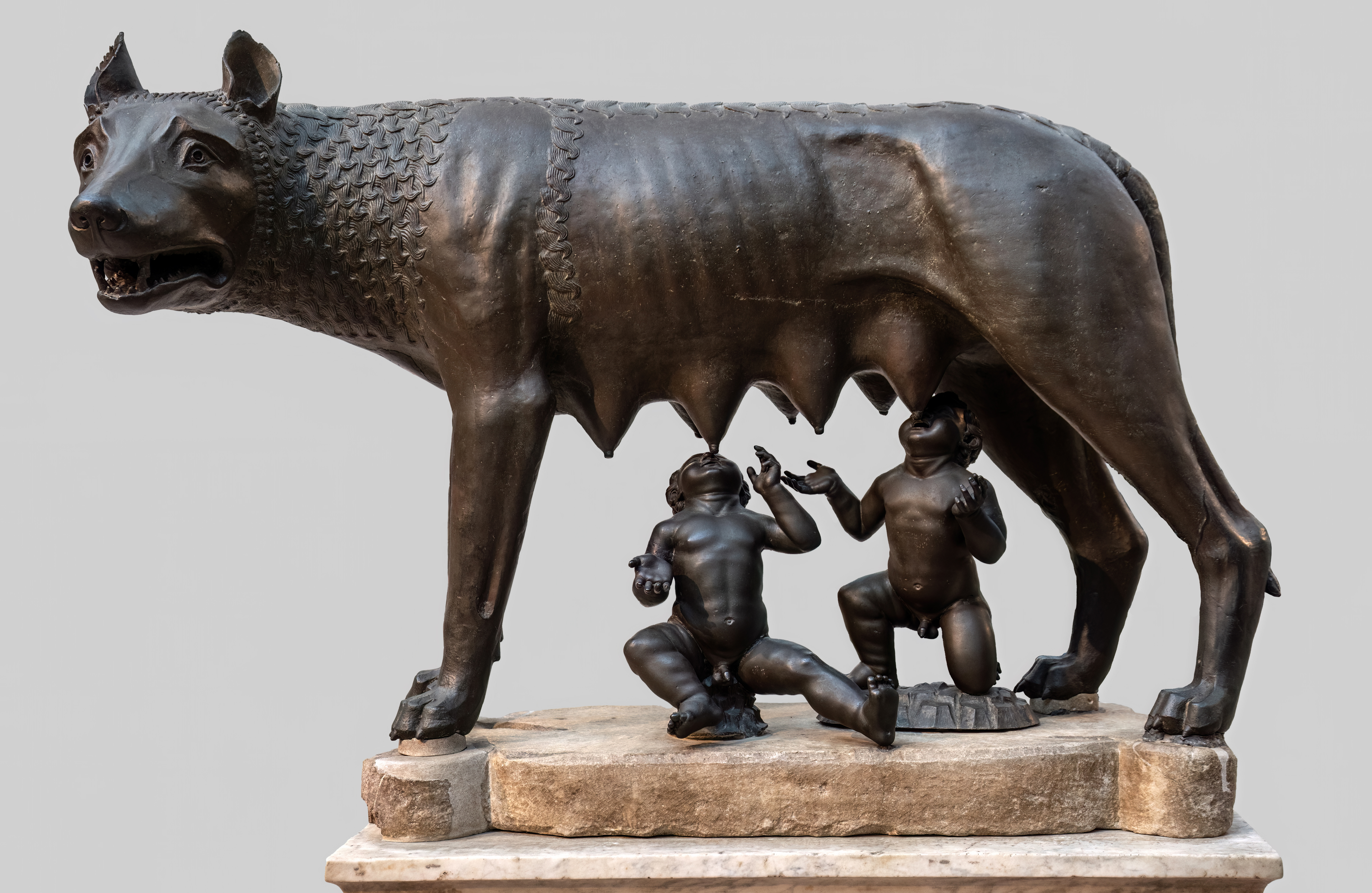
The bronze statue of the Capitoline Wolf, the symbol of Rome, who breastfeeds Romulus and Remus according to the legend of the Foundation of Rome; 5th century BC or 11th–12th centuries AD (wolf) Late 15th century AD (twins), height: 75 cm

There is also the symbol of the city, the bronze Capitoline Wolf, believed to be an Etruscan work from the 5th century BC; the original statue did not include the twins Romulus and Remus, added in the 15th century and attributed to the sculptor Antonio del Pollaiolo. Recently some restorers have hypothesized that the statue is not ancient, but medieval and that it dates back to the 12th century.

The Colossus of Constantine, visible in the courtyard, dates back to the 4th century. Other masterpieces of bronze sculpture are the Hercules of the Forum Boarium and the Boy with Thorn.

A masterpiece of medieval sculpture is the Portrait of Charles I of Anjou by Arnolfo di Cambio (1277), the first lifelike portrait of a living character sculpted in Europe that has reached us from the post-classical era.

Over time, other and numerous historical collections were exhibited here, such as the Protomoteca (collection of busts and herms of illustrious men transferred from the Pantheon to the Campidoglio by order of Pius VII in 1820); the collection of Cardinal Alessandro Albani; the one donated by Augusto Castellani in the second half of the 19th century, consisting of archaic ceramic materials (from the 8th century BC to the 4th century BC), mainly of Etruscan area, but also of Greek and Italic production.

The connection between the two museum locations, the Palazzo Nuovo and the Palazzo dei Conservatori, is guaranteed by the underground Galleria di conaccordo specially excavated in the 1930s and later used as a Galleria lapidaria, from which it is also possible to access the temple of Veiovis and the gallery of the Tabularium.

On the second floor of the Palazzo dei Conservatori is the Pinacoteca Capitolina, which houses works by Guercino, Caravaggio, Rubens, Titian and Velázquez.

== Location and palaces ==
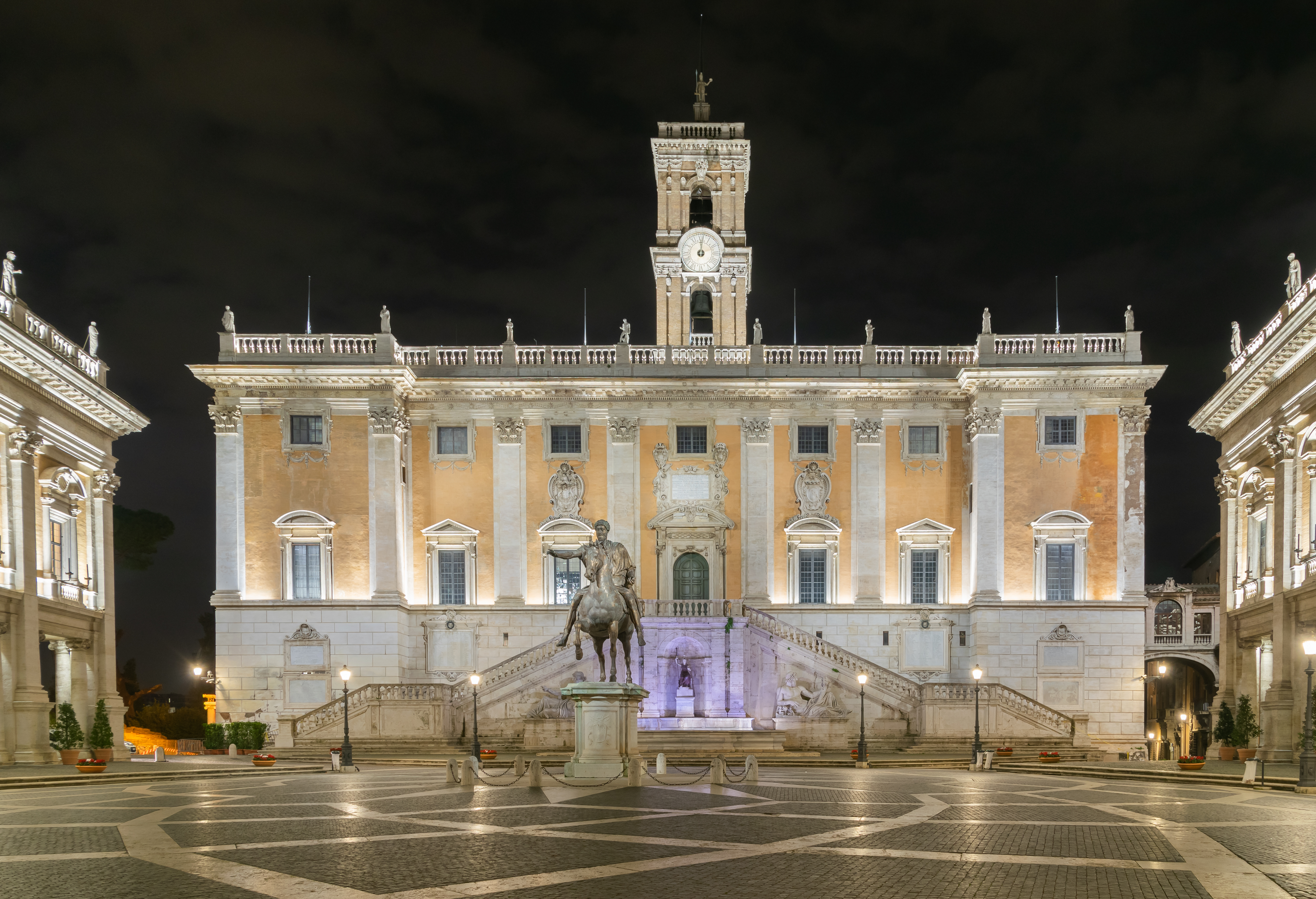
Night view of the Campidoglio from the Cordonata

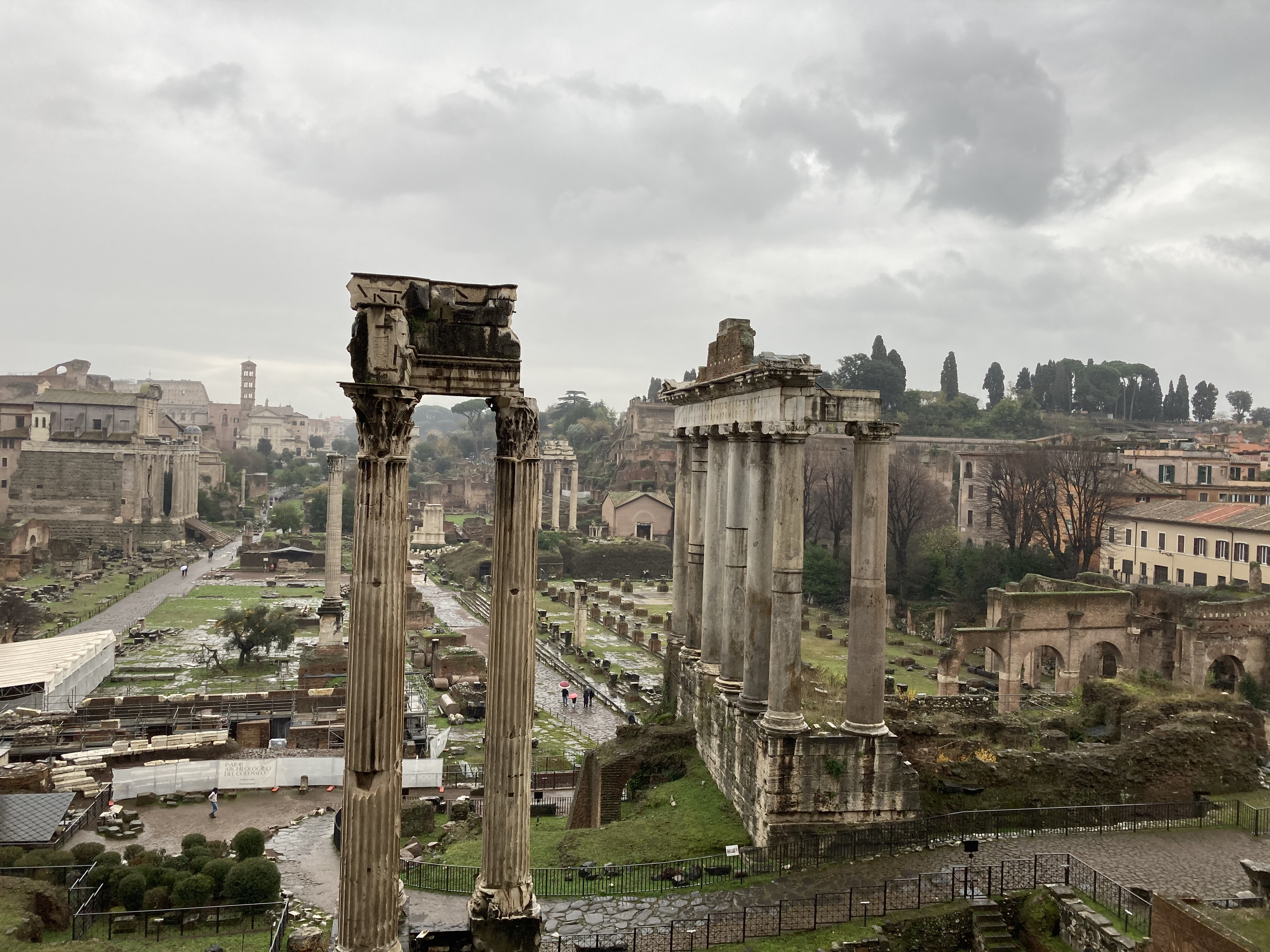
The Imperial Fora and the Colosseum, visible from the Tabularium

The Capitoline Museums are located on the Capitoline Hill, one of the seven hills of Rome, adjacent to the nearby Piazza Venezia, the Victor Emmanuel II Monument, the Imperial fora, in the heart of the city. The Piazza del Campidoglio which houses the museum is a monumental square located on the top of the Capitoline Hill in Rome, it stands on the Asylum – the depression located between the Arx and the Capitolium, the two summits of the Capitoline Hill – and below it is the Tabularium, visible from the Roman Forum.

Important works were carried out during the pontificate of Nicholas V, but the square took on its current appearance in the 16th century, when Paul III commissioned Michelangelo Buonarroti to completely remodel it on the occasion of the visit to Rome of Emperor Charles V. The project included the renovation of the facades of the Palazzo Senatorio, built a few years earlier on the ruins of the Tabularium, and of the Palazzo dei Conservatori, the construction of the Palazzo Nuovo and the addition of several sculptures and statues, including that of Marcus Aurelius, placed in the center of the square, and those depicting the Tiber and the Nile.

Despite initial abandonment in the early Middle Ages, the Tabularium had already been chosen as the seat of the Municipality of Rome in 1144, making it the oldest town hall in the world.

The three main Renaissance buildings of the Capitoline Museums are:

- Palazzo Senatorio, built in the 12th century and modified according to Michelangelo's designs;
- Palazzo dei Conservatori, built in the mid-16th century and redesigned by Michelangelo with the first use of the giant order column design; and
- Palazzo Nuovo, built in the 17th century with an identical exterior design to the Palazzo dei Conservatori, which it faces across the piazza.

In addition, the 16th century Palazzo Caffarelli-Clementino, located off the piazza adjacent to the Palazzo dei Conservatori, was added to the museum complex in the early 20th century.

== Palazzo dei Conservatori ==
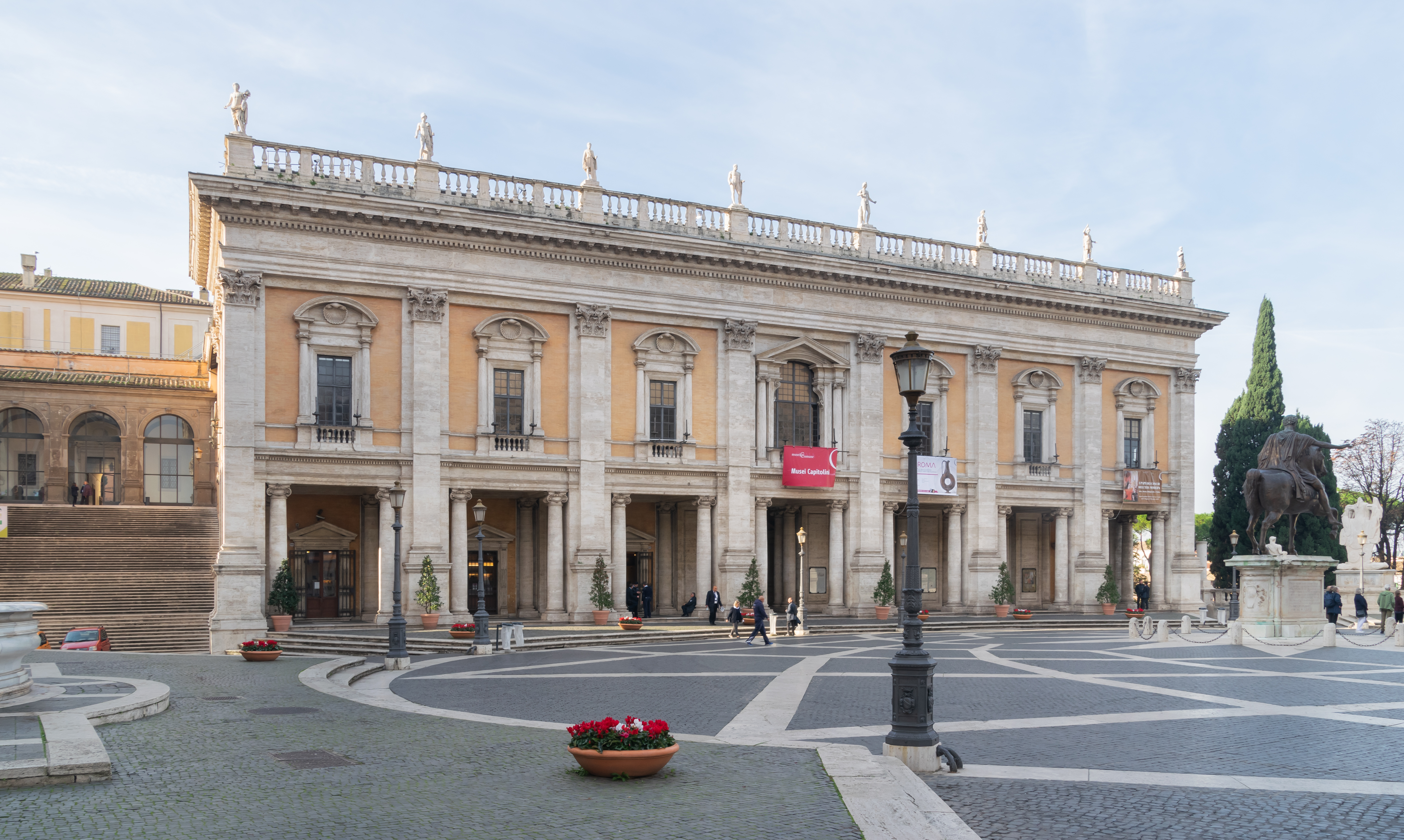
Facade of the Palazzo dei Conservatori

The Palazzo dei Conservatori is located in Piazza del Campidoglio to the right of the Palazzo Senatorio and opposite the Palazzo Nuovo. The Palazzo dei Conservatori owes its name to the fact that it was the seat of the city's elected magistracy, the Conservators, who together with the Senator administered Rome in the Middle-Age. The Palace in this position was erected by Pope Nicholas V. Michelangelo Buonarroti, who had been commissioned to carry out the overall redevelopment of the square, designed the new façade, which he did not, however, see completed as he died during the works (in 1564). His project redesigned the medieval façade of the palace, replacing the portico with two orders: the Corinthian one formed by high pilasters placed on large full-height pedestals, and the Ionic one that supports the vaults of the portico. Between these orders were placed a series of large windows, all of the same size. The works were continued by Guido Guidetti and completed in 1568 by Giacomo Della Porta who followed Michelangelo's designs almost faithfully, deviating from them only to build a larger reception room on the first floor and, consequently, a larger window than all the others on the facade of the palace. There were also transformations inside the palace, both for the construction of a large monumental staircase and for the new redistribution of the rooms of the "Apartment of the Conservators", which led to the destruction of the cycle of frescoes from the early sixteenth century that decorated the rooms overlooking Piazza del Campidoglio.

=== Courtyard and main staircase ===
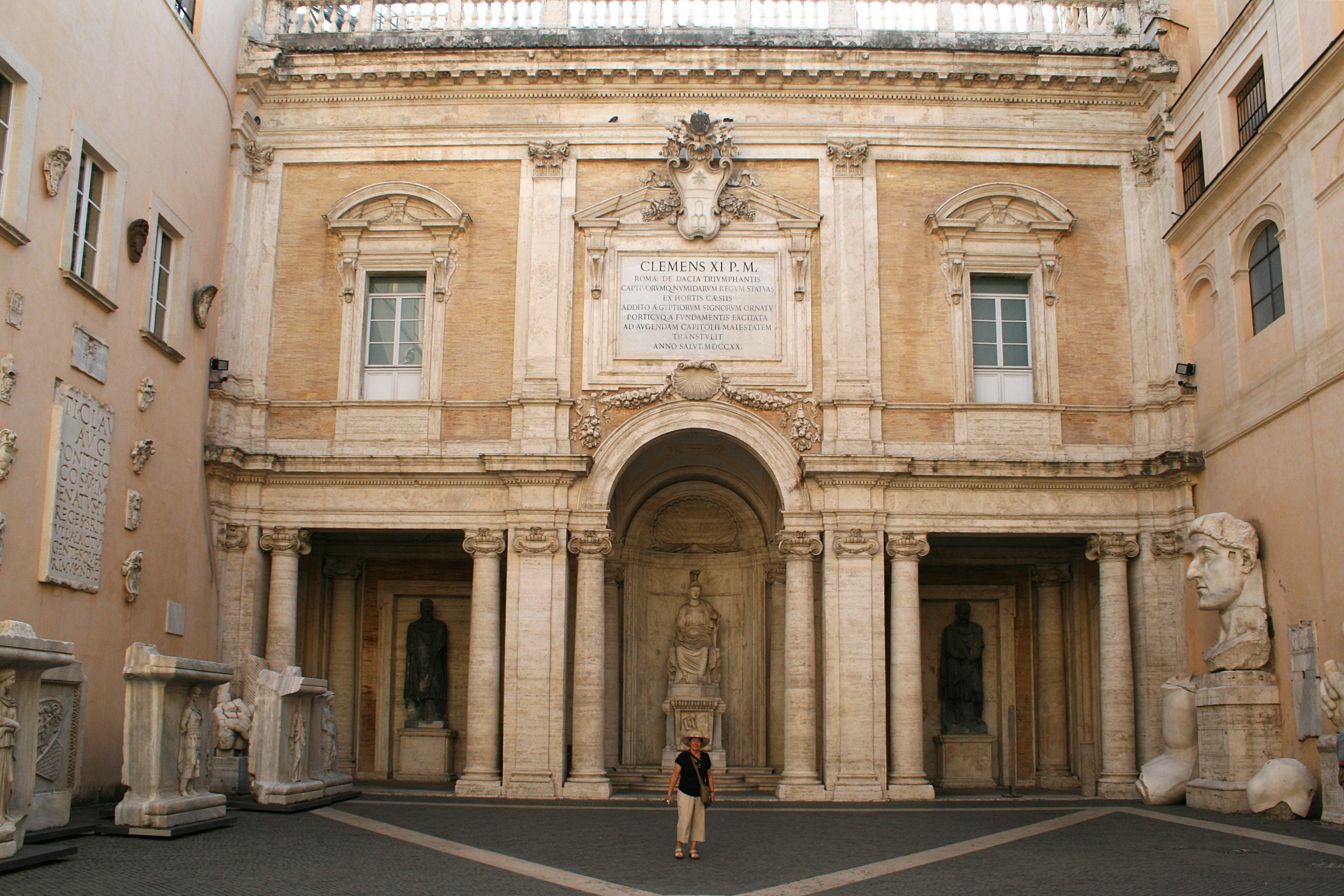
Courtyard of the Conservators

The courtyard and main staircase (ground floor); the Courtyard of the Palazzo dei Conservatori has always represented, since the beginning, a point of attraction for the conservation of the memory of the ancient: the works that flowed into the palace represented that cultural continuity inherited from the ancient world, almost as if they represented a bridge in the virtual connection with a glorious past. The main works include the Colossus of Constantine; the reliefs depicting the personifications of the Roman provinces from the Temple of Hadrian in Piazza di Pietra; two colossal statues of Dacians in grey-brown marble (from Trajan's Forum), purchased by Pope Clement XI in 1720 from the Cesi collection and placed at the sides; a statue of the goddess Roma seated, modelled on the Greek statues of Phidias, which probably belonged to a 1st-century arch. In the shelves of the staircase that leads from the courtyard to the upper floors are inserted some reliefs from Roman antiquity. Three of them were part of a triumphal arch dedicated to Marcus Aurelius and arrived in the Campidoglio since 1515, three others dedicated to the emperor Hadrian welcomed by three personifications (goddess Roma, Senate and Roman People), comes from a discovery in Piazza Sciarra and was purchased by the Conservatori in 1573.

=== Piano nobile ===
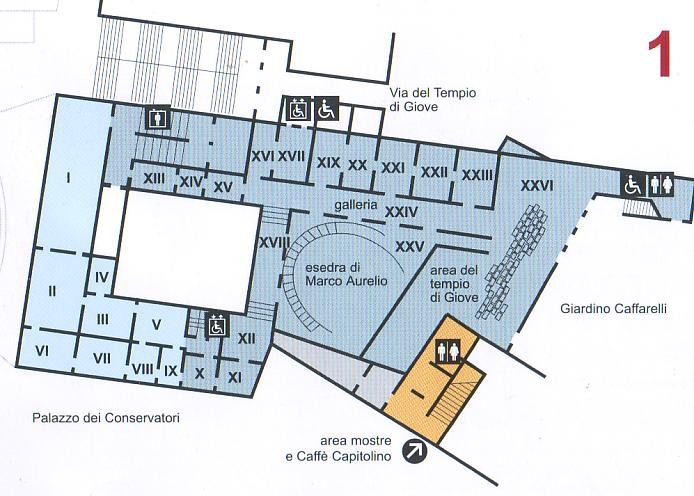
Plan of the piano nobile of the Palazzo dei Conservatori

From the staircase, one enters, from the front, the Conservatori Apartment, composed of nine rooms. This "apartment" was closely linked to the function performed by the Conservatori who, together with the Prior of the Caporioni, represented the three Roman Magistrates starting from 1305. The nine rooms are divided into:

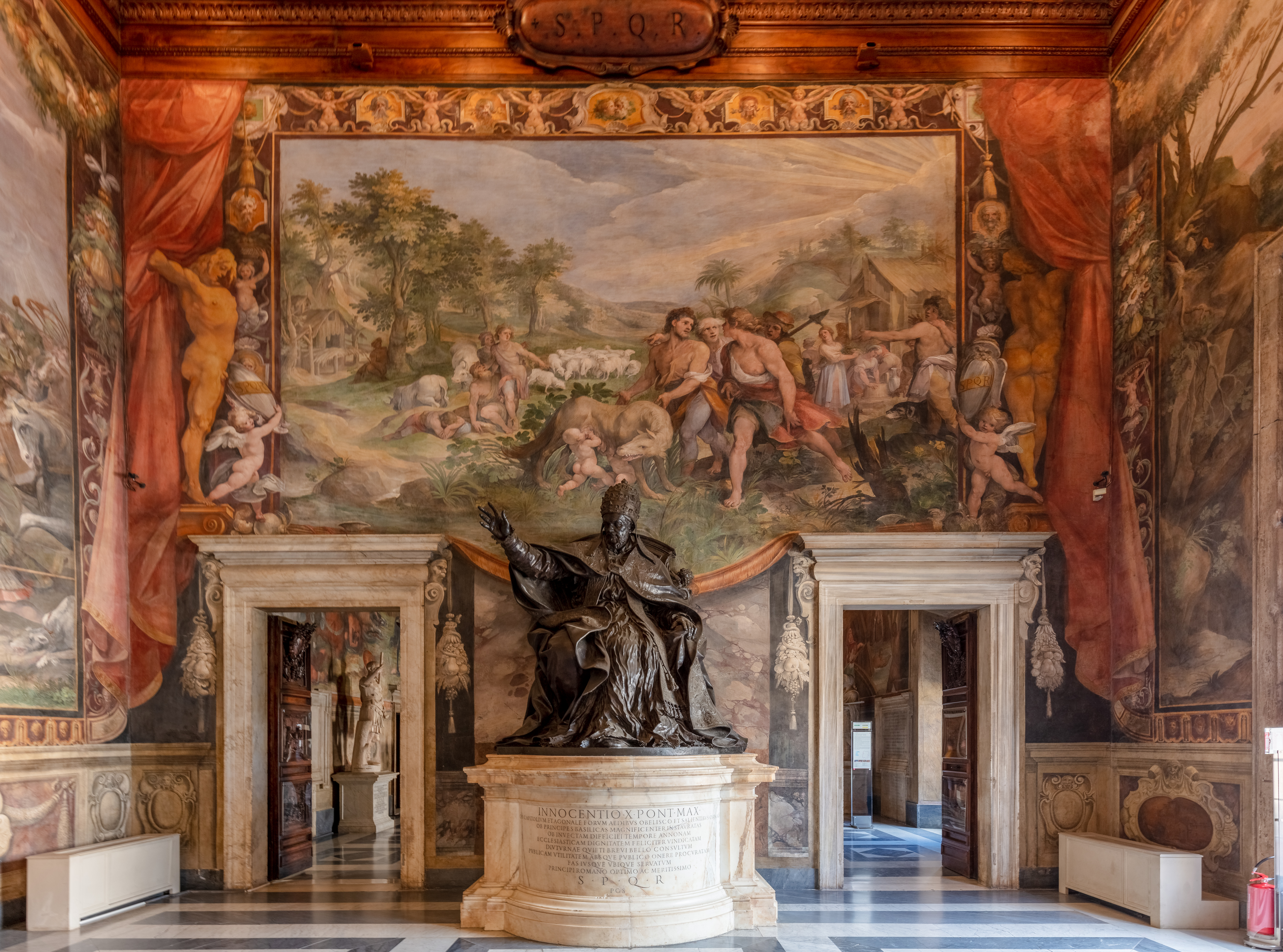
The Finding of the She-Wolf Giuseppe Cesari (1595–1596). Hall of the Horatii and Curiatii.

- I – Hall of the Horatii and Curiatii; the Public Council met in the large hall after Michelangelo's renovation. Even today it is often used for important ceremonies, such as the signing of the Treaties of Rome in 1957, which established the European Economic Community.
- II – Hall of the Captains; frescoed by the Sicilian painter Tommaso Laureti between 1586 and 1594 in a style attributable to Giulio Romano, Michelangelo Buonarroti and Raphael.
- III – Hall of Hannibal; it houses a collection of frescoes belonging to the cycle of the Punic Wars.
- IV – Chapel; dedicated to the Madonna and the saints Peter and Paul patrons of the city, it was frescoed in the years 1575–1578 by the painters Michele Alberti and Iacopo Rocchetti.
- V – Hall of Tapestries; intended in 1770 to house the papal canopy. The tapestries were made by the Pontifical Factory of San Michele a Ripa.
- VI – Hall of Triumphs; houses some famous bronzes from the Roman era: the Spinario, the Camillus (donated by Pope Sixtus IV in 1471), the so-called portrait of Lucius Junius Brutus (donated by Cardinal Rodolfo Pio in 1564), commonly called Capitoline Brutus, and a bronze crater of Mithridates VI Eupator.

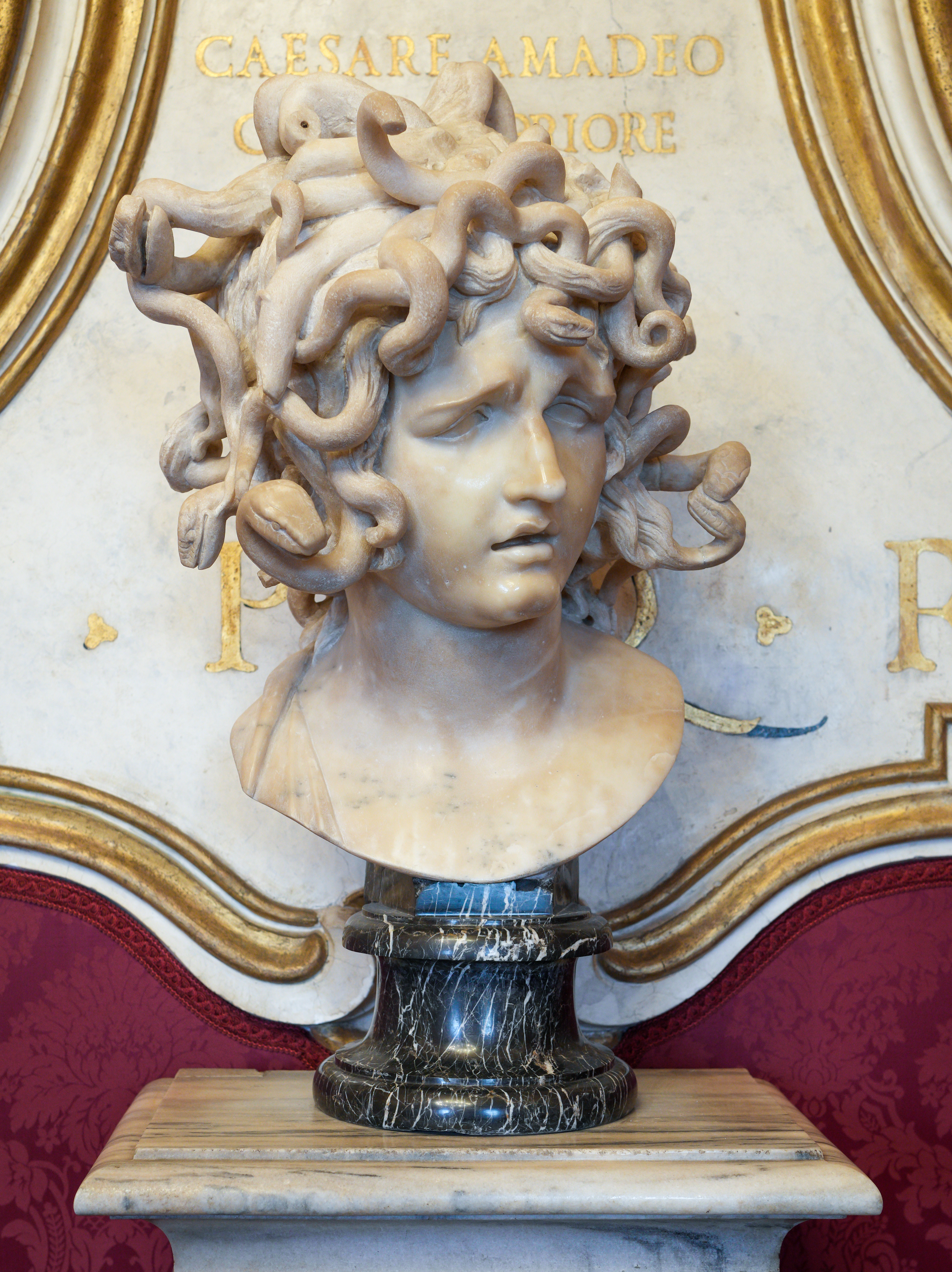
Medusa head by Bernini (1638–1645)

- VIII – Hall of the Geese; houses the head of Medusa by Gian Lorenzo Bernini, which represents Costanza Piccolomini Bonarelli, an eighteenth-century portrait of Michelangelo Buonarroti and a whole series of small bronze works that had been purchased by Pope Benedict XIII.
- IX – Hall of the Eagles
- X, XI and XII – Castellani Rooms; these three rooms display objects from donations by Augusto Castellani from 1867 (collection of Etruscan vases) and 1876 (large collection of ancient objects).
- XIII and XIV – Halls of Modern Fasti

These halls house the Modern Fasti, marble tables engraved with the names of the city's civic magistrates (senatores) from 1640 to 1870.

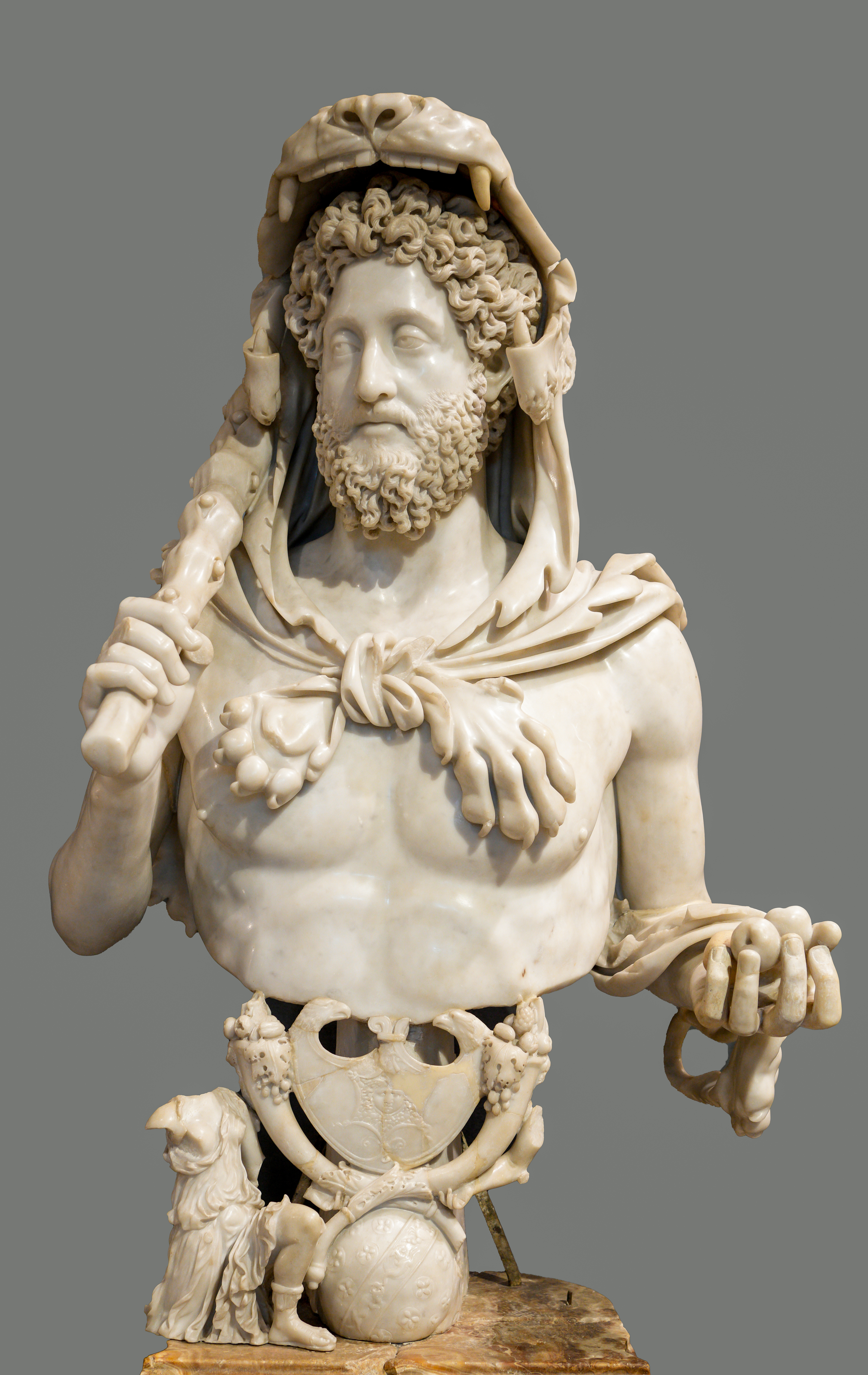
Commodus as Hercules 192 AD

- XV, XVI, XVII and XVIII – Halls of the Horti Lamiani

here are collected materials from excavations in the Esquilino area, between Piazza Vittorio Emenuele II and Piazza Dante. Among these, part of an alabaster floor and fragments of the architectural decoration in opus sectile of a cryptoporticus, the Esquiline Venus and the Commodus as Hercules.

- XIX and XX – Halls of the Horti Tauriani and Vettiani
- XXI, XXII and XXIII – Halls of the Gardens of Maecenas

Here are exhibited among other things the Marsyas being tortured and the so-called Head of Amazon, Rhyton of Pontios (neo-Attic fountain from the Horti Maecenatis.

- XXIV – Gallery of the Horti; hare exhibited two large ornamental craters and the portraits of Hadrian, Vibia Sabina and Matidia from the Horti Tauriani.
- XXV – Exedra of Marcus Aurelius; the new wing, which with a glass hall expands the exhibition space of the Museums, was inaugurated in December 2005; the project also included a new arrangement of the nearby foundations of the temple of Capitoline Jupiter. The main pieces now permanently exhibited in the exedra are the original Equestrian Statue of Marcus Aurelius, put indoors after the restoration at the end of the 20th century, the gilded bronze Hercules from the Forum Boarium, the fragments of the colossal bronze statue of Constantine belonging to the initial donation of Sixtus IV (together with the Capitoline Wolf, which on special occasions is moved from its hall and exhibited in the exedra).

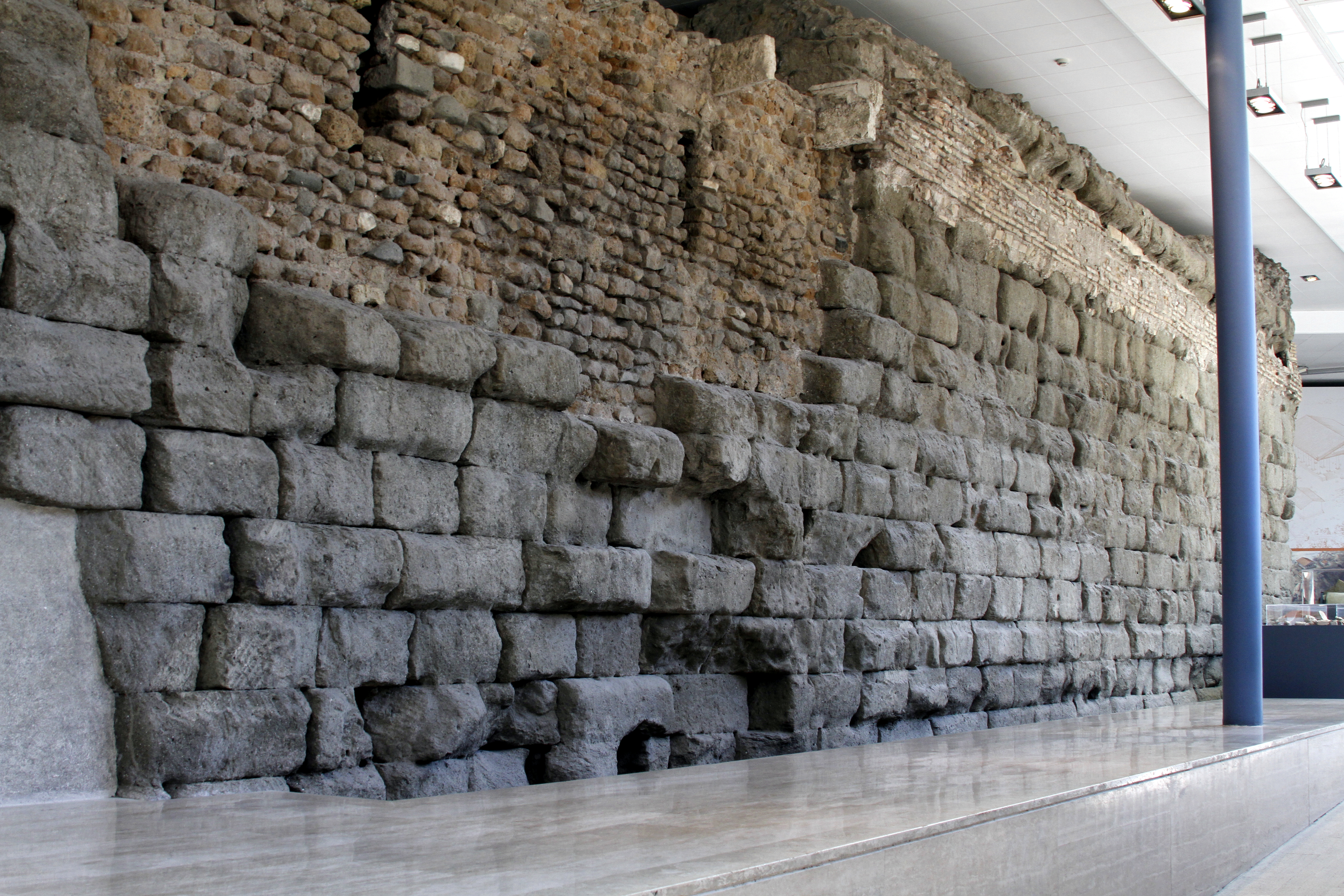
Side wall – Temple of Jupiter Optimus exhibited in the museum

- XXVI – Area of the Temple of Capitoline Jupiter

The exhibition space presents finds from the archaic temples of the 6th century before the common era, excavated in the mid-20th century in the Sant'Omobono Area, and a section that illustrates the results of the most recent excavations carried out in the lower layers of this area of the Capitoline Hill, which document its occupation starting from the 10th century BC.

=== Pinacoteca Capitolina ===
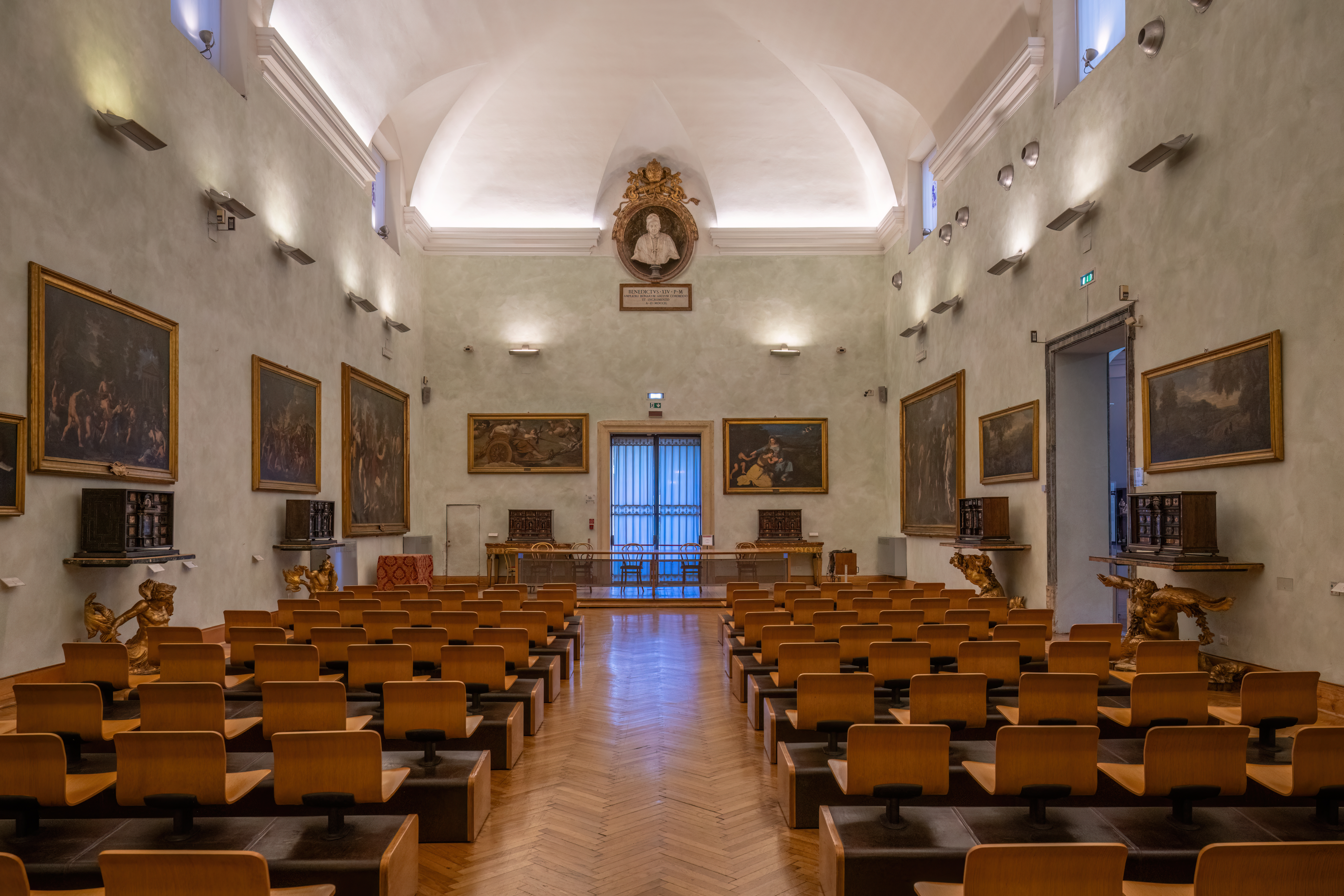
Pietro da Cortona Hall with some of the artist's main paintings such as the Rape of the Sabines

The Pinacoteca Capitolina (Capitoline Art Gallery), originally from the collection of the Sacchetti marquises and the Principi Pio di Savoia. family, is part of the Capitoline Museums complex, housed on the Campidoglio in the Palazzo dei Conservatori and in the Palazzo Nuovo.

The credit for the creation of the Art Gallery must be shared between the pontiff Benedict XIV and his secretary of state, Cardinal Silvio Valenti Gonzaga, one of the main patrons and collectors of eighteenth-century Rome. In 1748, over 180 paintings were purchased from the Sacchetti family, owners of one of the most important Roman collections, the Sacchetti collection, formed during the seventeenth century by Marcello Sacchetti and his brother, Cardinal Giulio. Over time, the Pinacoteca's collection has increased significantly thanks to the arrival of numerous paintings, which arrived in the Campidoglio through purchases, bequests and donations. With the Cini donation of 1880, numerous decorative art objects entered the collection, including a notable collection of porcelain. Administered, in the first hundred years of its life, by the pontifical structures of the Camerlengato and the Sacred Apostolic Palaces, the Capitoline Art Gallery has been under the jurisdiction of the Municipality of Rome since 1847. The collection contains paintings by Caravaggio, Titian, Peter Paul Rubens, Annibale Carracci, Guido Reni, Guercino, Mattia Preti, Pietro da Cortona, Domenichino, Giovanni Lanfranco, Dosso Dossi and Garofalo.

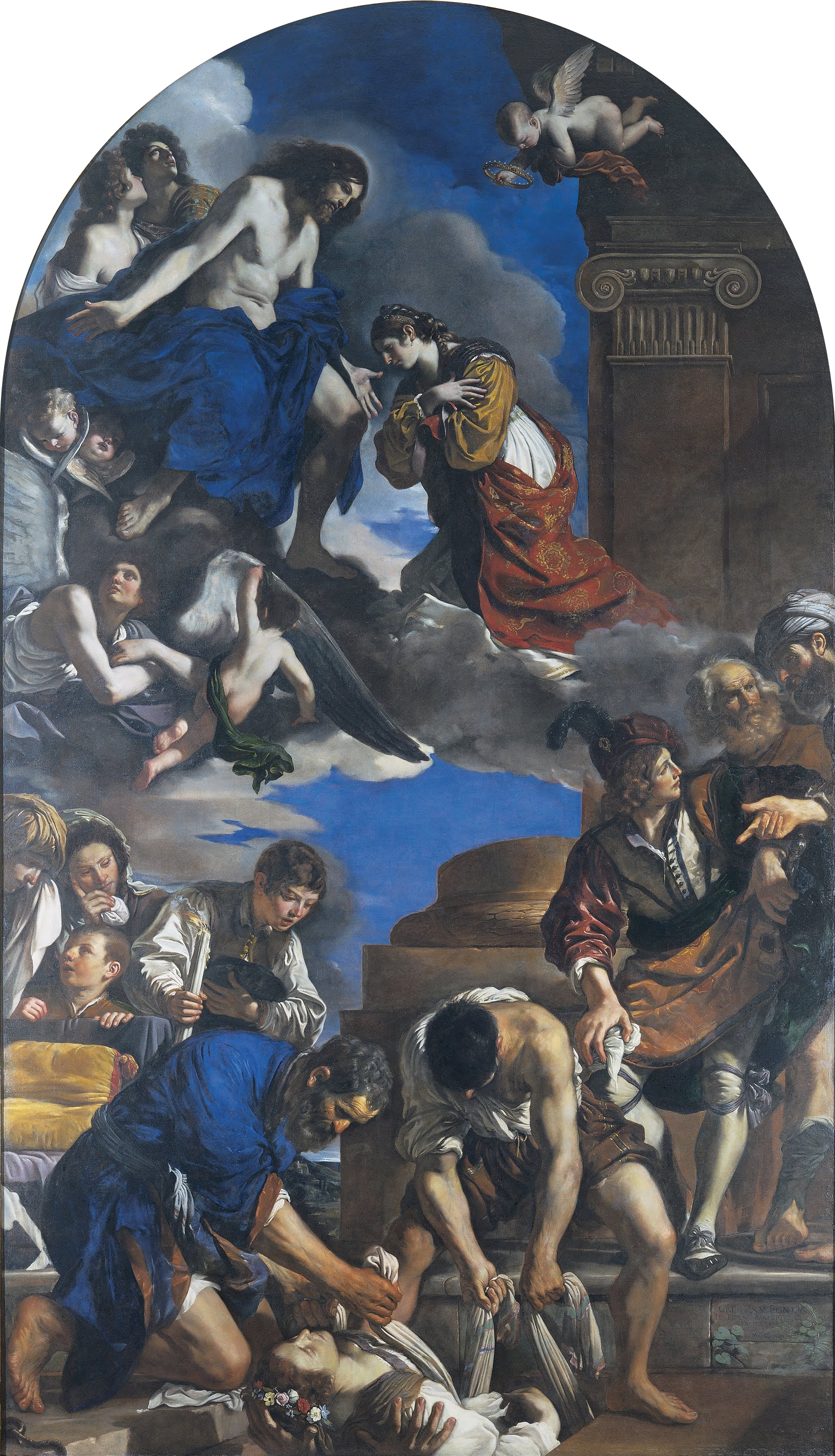
The Burial of St. Petronilla, Guercino, 1623

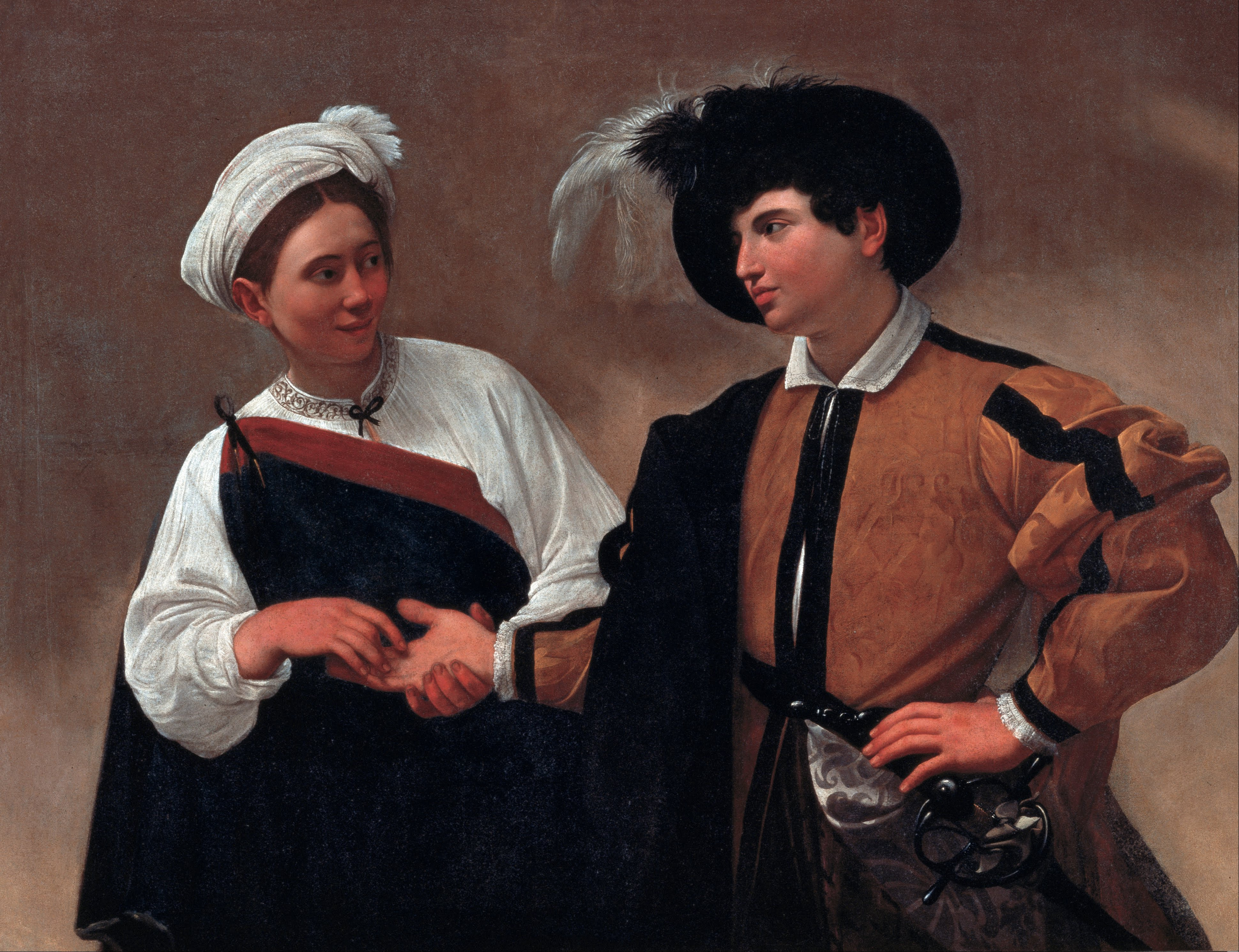
The Fortune Teller, Caravaggio, 1593–1595

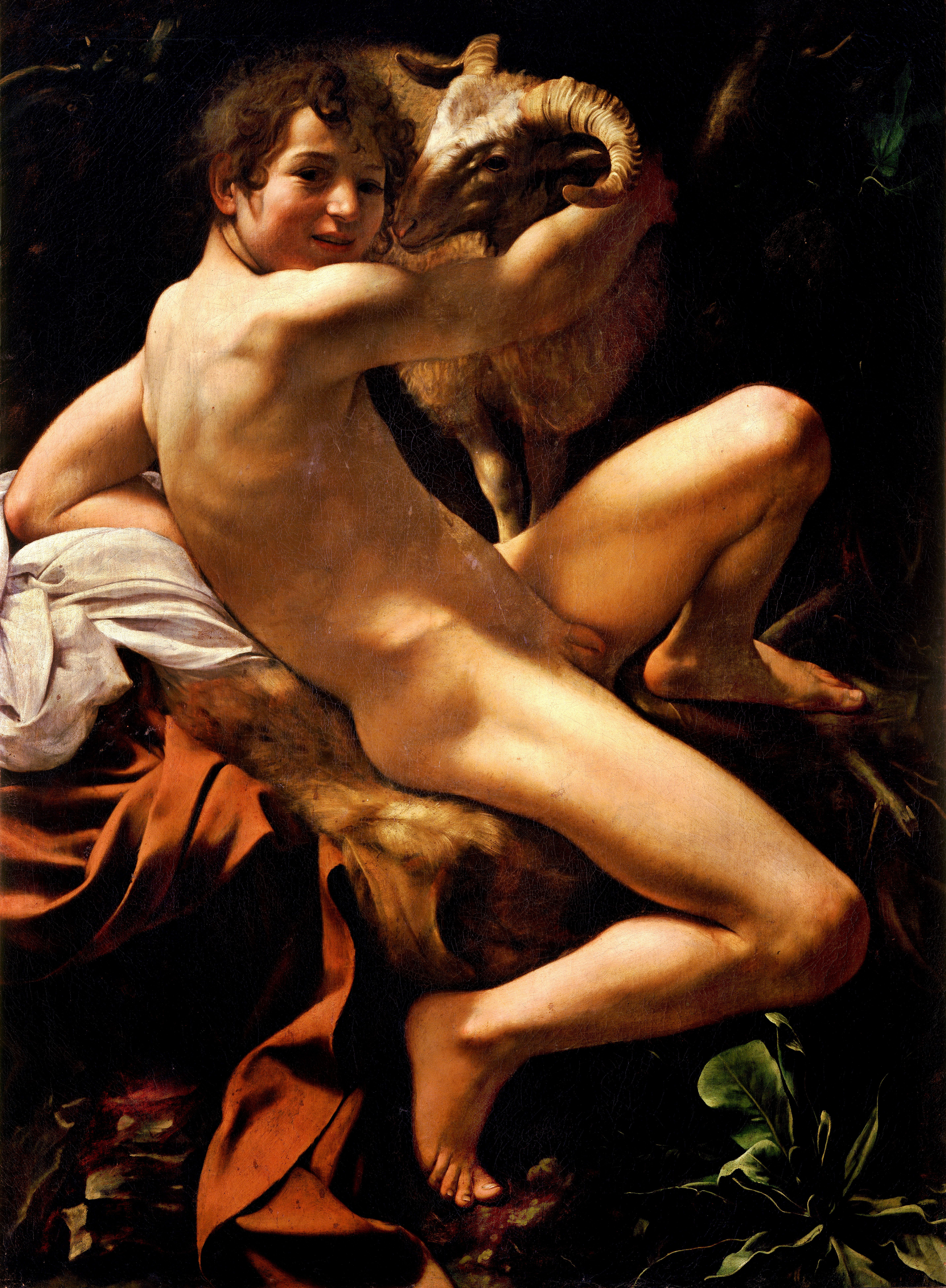
John the Baptist, Caravaggio, 1602

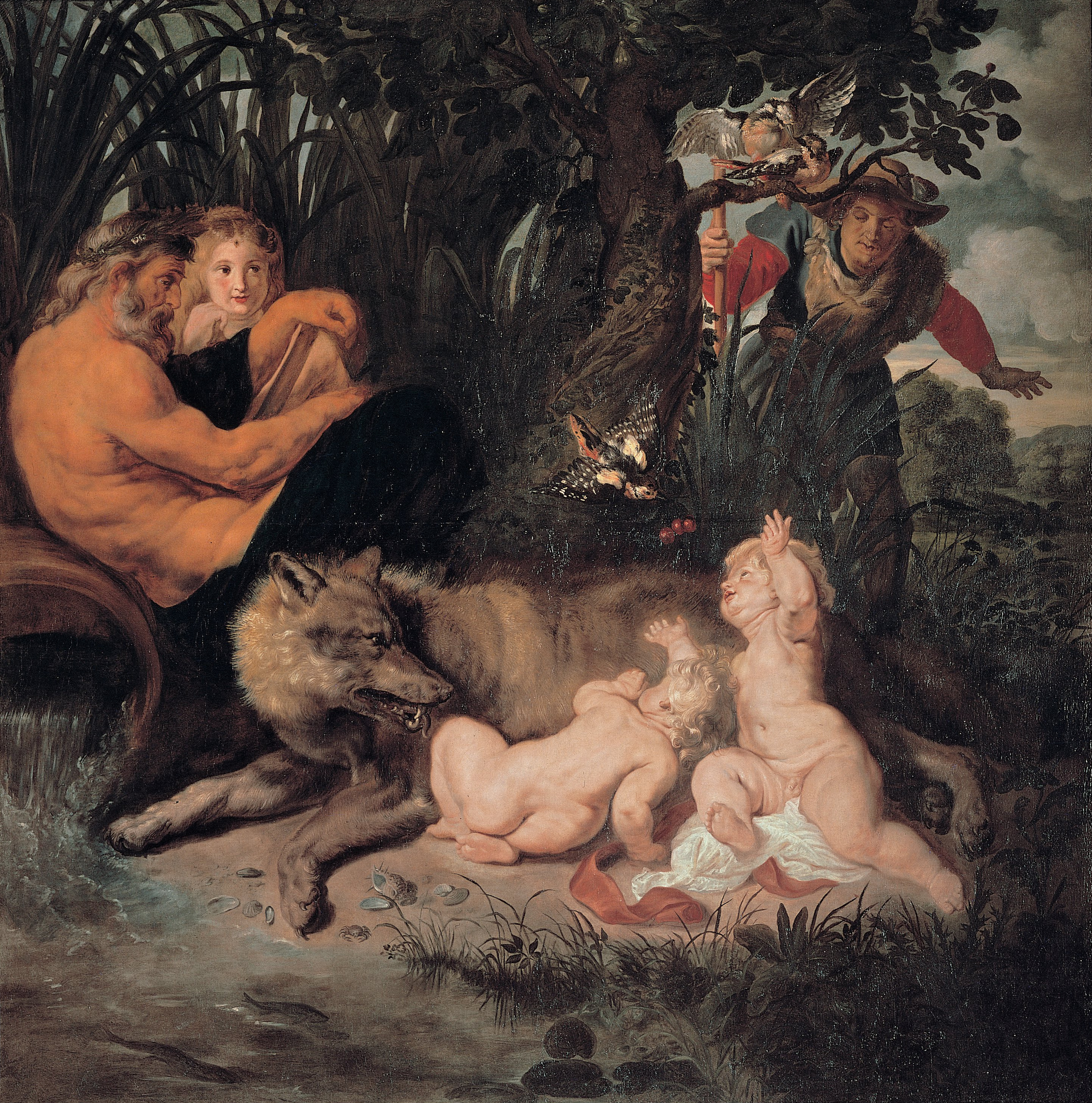
Romulus and Remus, Peter Paul Rubens, 1615–1616

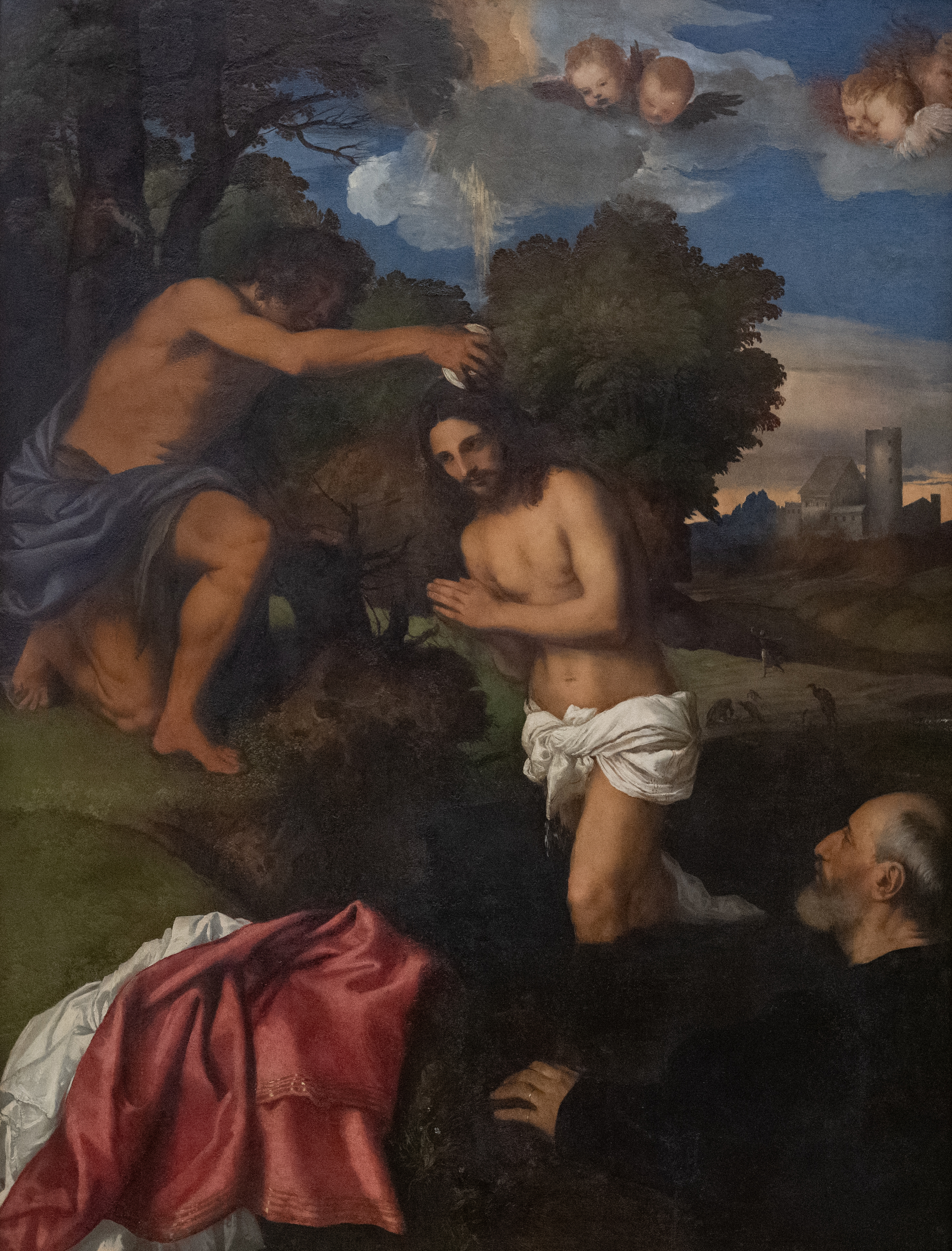
Baptism of Christ, Titian, ca. 1512

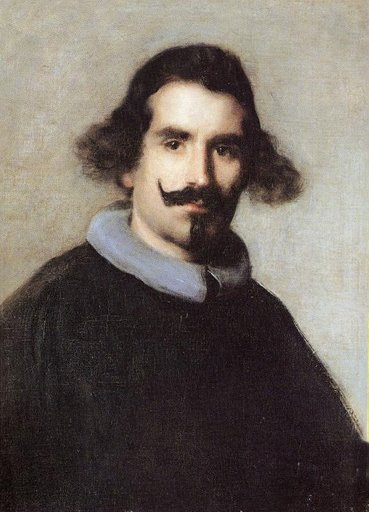
Portrait of Juan de Córdoba, Diego Velázquez, 1630

== Palazzo Nuovo ==
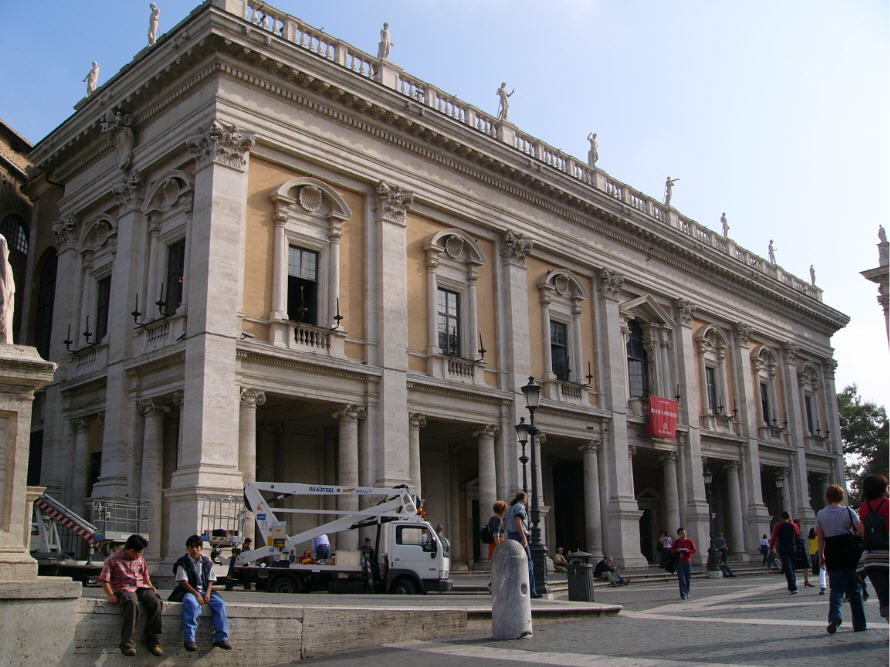
Facade of the Palazzo Nuovo

The palace was built only in the 17th century, probably in two phases, under the direction of Girolamo Rainaldi and then of his son Carlo Rainaldi who completed it in 1663. However, the project, at least of the façade, must be attributed to Michelangelo Buonarroti. Built in front of the Palazzo dei Conservatori, it was used as a museum since the 19th century and preserves numerous finds from Hadrian's Villa in Tivoli.

=== Atrium and courtyard ===
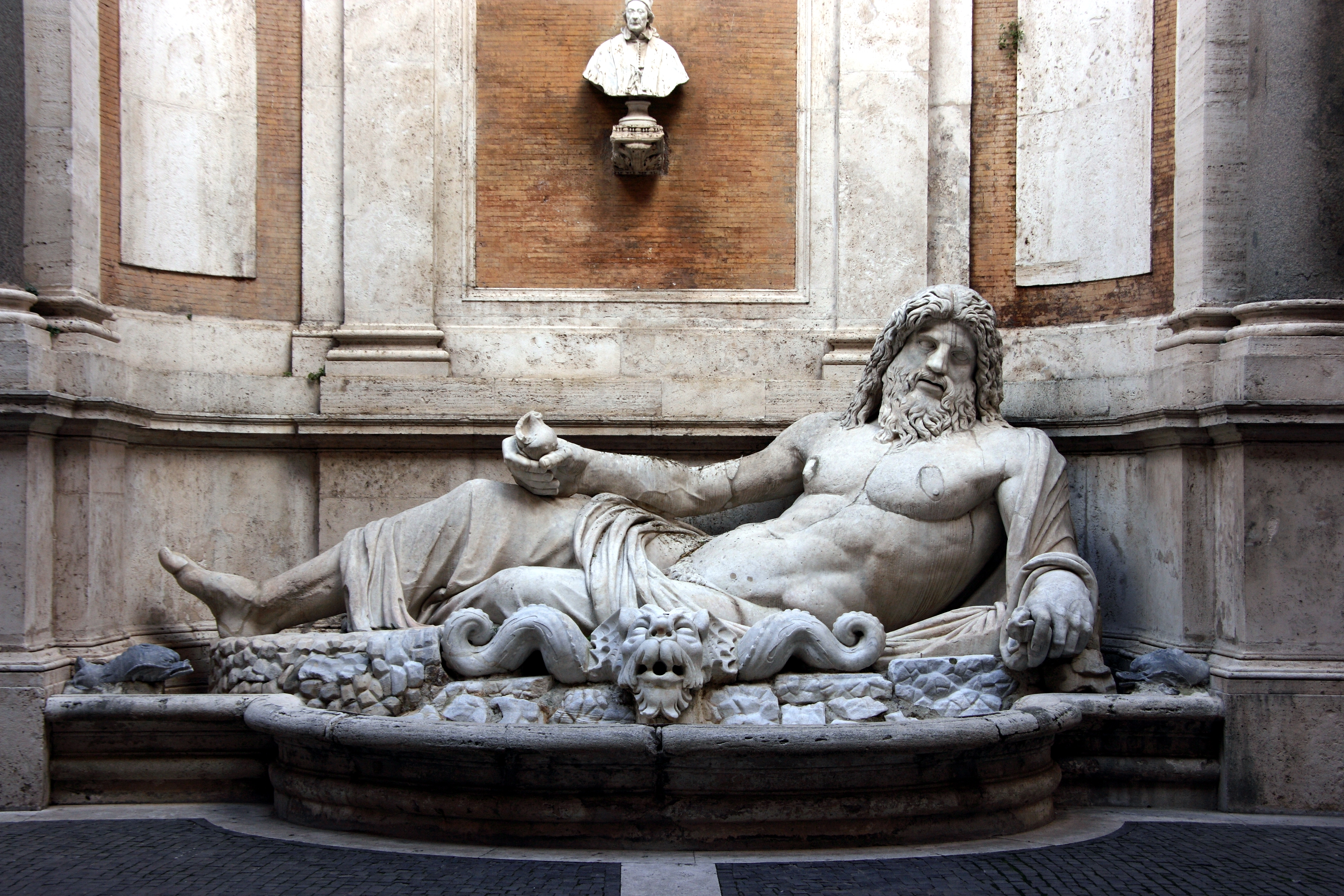
The Marforio, is one of the talking statues of Rome; 1st century AD.

The internal space on the ground floor hosts a portico with large statues (such as that of Minerva or Faustina the Elder-Ceres), which once belonged to the Vatican Belvedere Collection and were later donated to the city of Rome.

In the middle of the atrium is the courtyard, where the fountain is located, surmounted by the statue known as the Marforio, so called following its discovery in the sixteenth century, in the Forum of Mars (Martis Forum, a name that the ancients attributed to the Forum of Augustus). Two statues of Satyrs carrying a basket of fruit on their heads: they are two mirror-image statues depicting the god Pan, probably used as telamons in the architectural structure of the theatre of Pompey. Also on display is a colossal statue of Mars, found in the 16th century in the Forum of Nerva. There is also a group featuring Polyphemus, who holds a young prisoner at his feet.

=== Hall of Egyptian Monuments ===
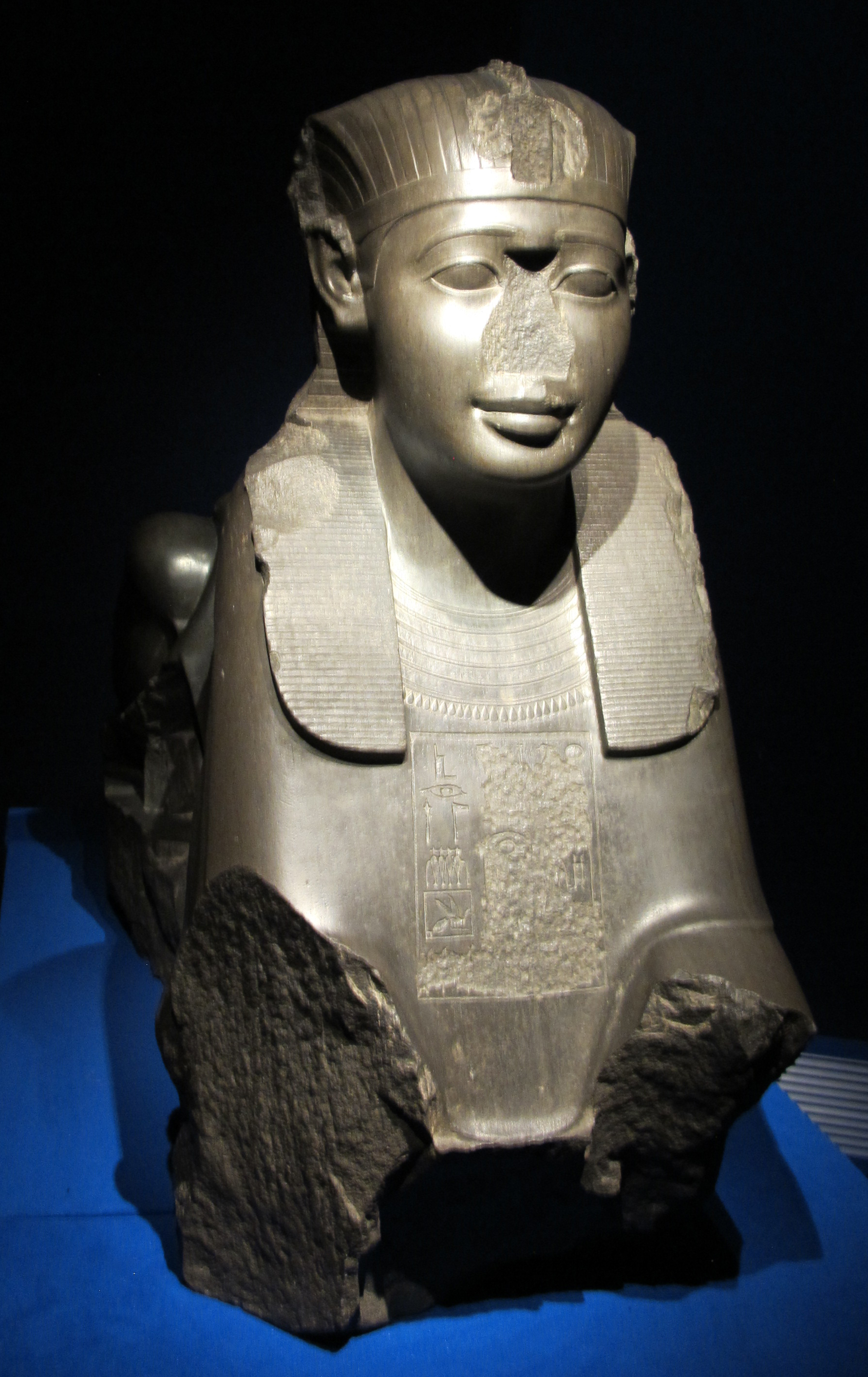
Sphinx of Pharaoh Amasis II of the XXVI dynasty

During the pontificate of Clement XI, a series of statues found in the area of the Villa Verospi Vitelleschi (Horti Sallustiani) were acquired, which decorated the Egyptian pavilion built by the emperor Hadrian. There were four statues, which were placed in the Palazzo Nuovo. Later, however (from 1838), almost all the Egyptian sculptures were transferred to the Vatican.

Today, the Hall of Egyptian Monuments is accessed through the courtyard; behind a large glass wall are the large granite works. Among the most representative works are a large bell-shaped krater from Hadrian's Villa and a series of animals symbolizing the most important Egyptian deities: the crocodile, two cynocephali, a sparrowhawk, a sphinx, a scarab, etc.

=== Ground floor rooms on the right ===
The name "ground floor rooms" identifies the three rooms on the ground floor to the right of the atrium, which houses works including fragments of "post-Caesarian" Roman calendars showing the new year, which Caesar defined as 365 days, as well as lists of magistrates called "Fasti Minori", in relation to the more famous "Fasti consulares", preserved in the Palazzo dei Conservatori. The first room contains numerous portraits of Roman private individuals, among which one stands out, perhaps that of Germanicus Julius Caesar or his father Drusus the Elder; the cinerary urn of T. Statilius Aper and Orcivia Anthis; the Sarcophagus with reliefs depicting an episode from the life of Achilles.

=== Gallery of the Palazzo Nuovo ===
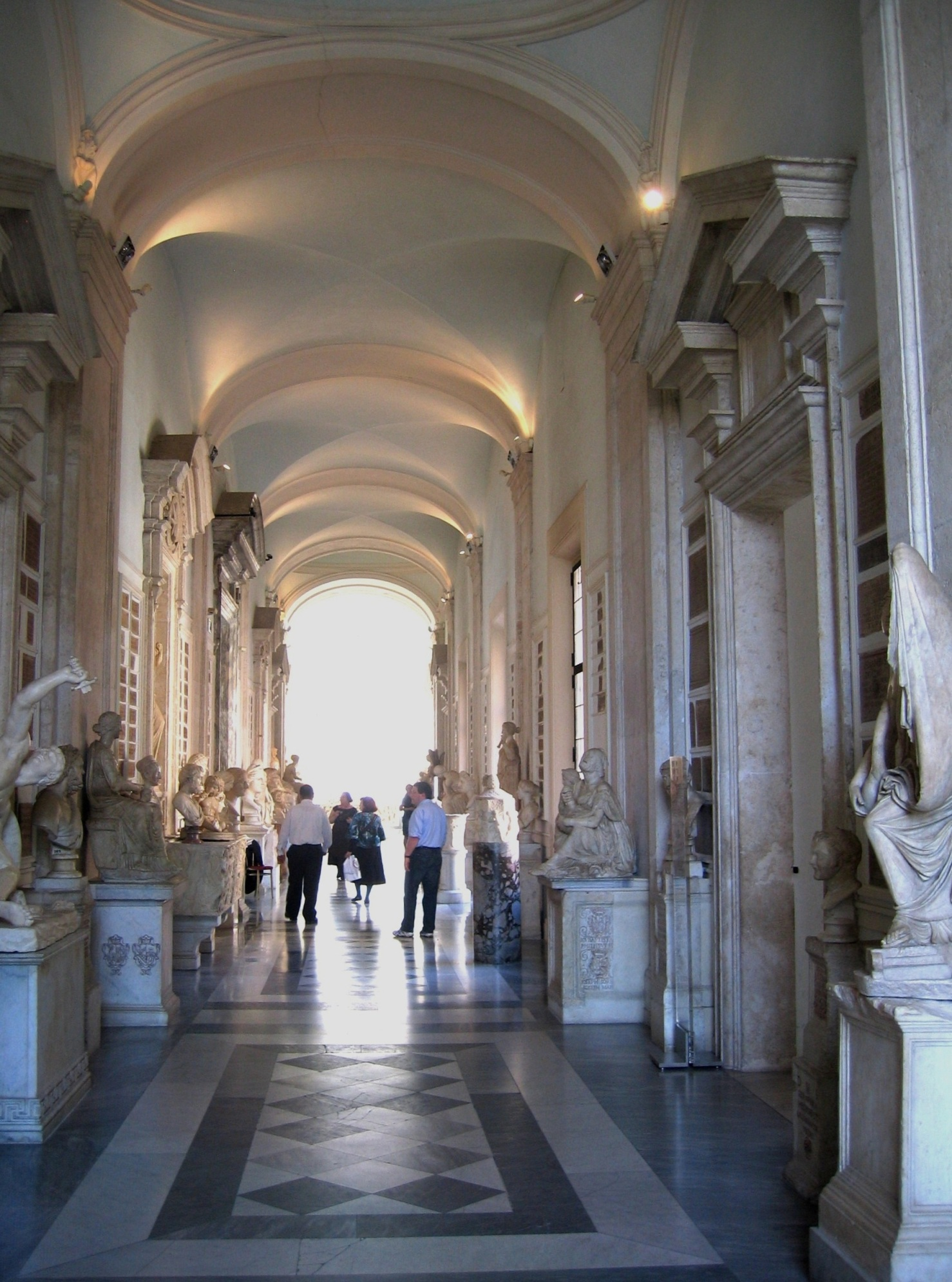
Panorama of the Gallery of Palazzo Nuovo

The Gallery, which runs longitudinally along the first floor of the Capitoline Museum, connecting the various rooms and offering visitors a large and varied collection of statues, portraits, reliefs and epigraphs arranged by the eighteenth-century Conservatories.

Numerous statues are preserved in the Gallery, such as that of Hercules, restored as Hercules Killing the Hydra (marble, a Roman copy of a Greek original from the 4th century BC, found during the renovation of the church of Sant'Agnese in Agone and restored in 1635); the fragment of the leg of Hercules fighting the Hydra (heavily reworked in the seventeenth-century restoration); the statue of a wounded warrior, also called the Capitoline Discobolus (of which only the torso is ancient, perhaps a copy of the Discobolus by Miron, while the rest is the work of the restoration carried out between 1658 and 1733 by Pierre-Étienne Monnot perhaps on the model of the statues of Pergamon known as the "little barbarians"); the statue of Leda with the swan (perhaps a Roman copy of the 4th century BC group attributed to Timotheus); statue of a young Hercules strangling the serpent (ca. 150–200, from the collection of Cardinal Alessandro Albani), in which recently it has been suggested that a young Caracalla or even Marcus Annius Verus Caesar; Eros with the bow (Roman copy of Lysippos, from Tivoli); statue of an Old Drunkard, marble sculpture dating back to around 300–280 BC and known from Roman copies, the best of which are the one in the Glyptothek in Munich (h 92 cm) and the one in the Capitoline Museum.

=== Hall of Doves ===
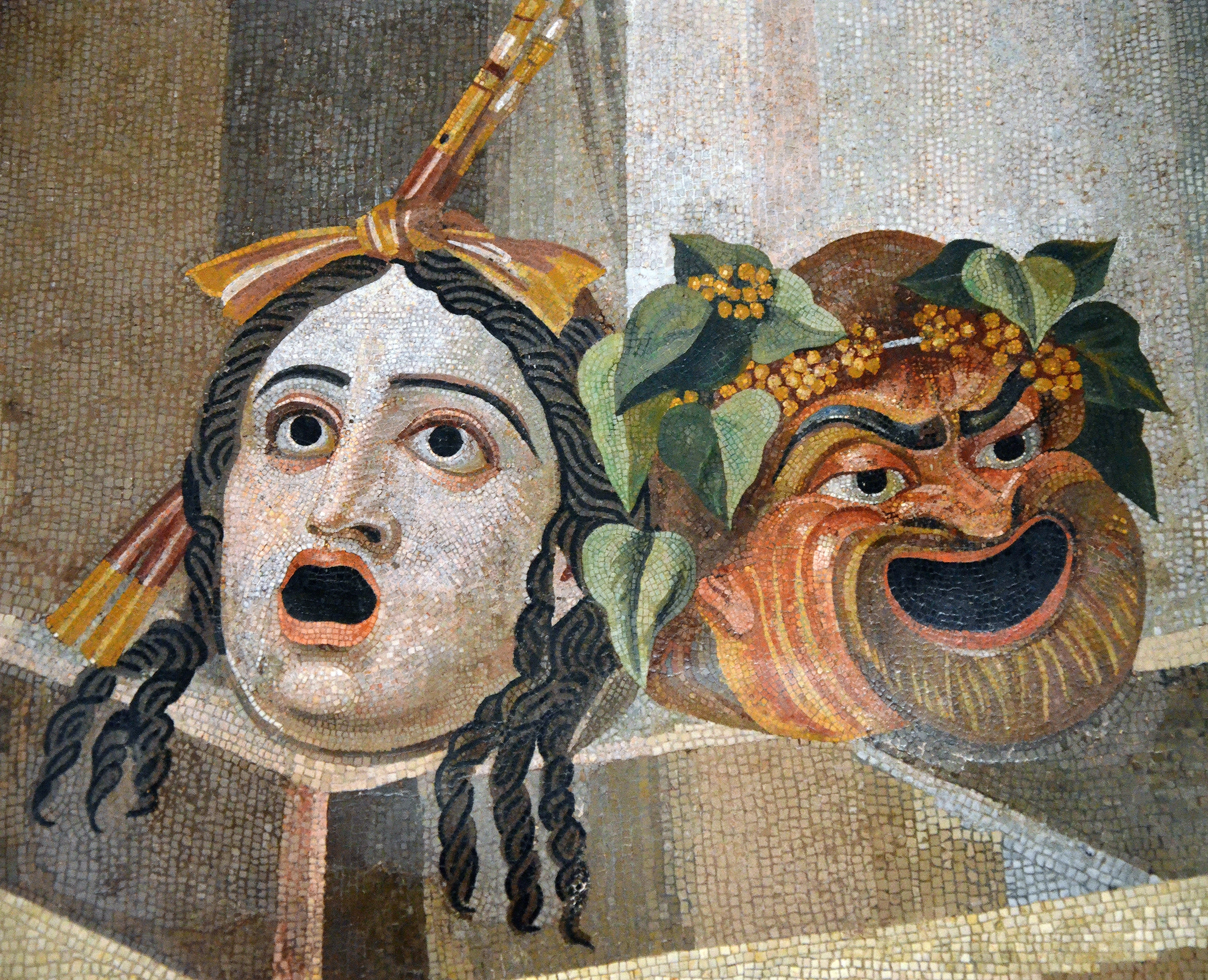
Mosaic with scenic masks; 2nd century AD, height: 74.6 cm

The room takes its name from the famous floor mosaic: the mosaic of the doves, found at Hadrian's Villa and attributed to a Greek mosaicist named Sosus of Pergamon. The works contained here belonged mostly to the collection of Cardinal Alessandro Albani, whose acquisition is at the origin of the Capitoline Museum. The arrangement of the male and female portraits (including a portrait of the emperor Trajan and a male portrait from the Republican era), along shelves that run along the entire perimeter of the wall of the room, dates back to an eighteenth-century layout project and is still visible, albeit with some imperceptible changes. An arrangement that has never been altered is that of the Roman sepulchral inscriptions affixed, in the mid-eighteenth century, to the upper part of the walls. Inside the room we remember:

- The bronze tablet (3rd century) with which the College of the Fabri of Sentinum assigned to Coretius Fuscus the honorary title of patron;
- The tabula iliaca (1st century);
- A bronze inscription from the Aventine Hill containing a dedication to Septimius Severus and the imperial family, placed in 203 by the vigiles of the IV cohort of that regio;
- The decree of Gnaeus Pompeius Strabo (the so-called Bronze of Ascoli), which granted special privileges to some Spanish knights who had fought on behalf of the Romans in the Battle of Asculum (89 BC);
- The oldest surviving bronze decree of the Senate, almost entirely preserved: the Senatus consultum concerning Asclepiades of Clazomenae and his allies (78 BC), which attributed the title of friends of the Roman People to three Greek navarchs who had fought alongside the Romans in the Social War (91–88 BC) or perhaps in the Sulla's civil war (83–82 BC). The text is written in Latin with a Greek translation, which remained in the lower part of the panel, which allowed the integration of the mutilated writing.
- In addition to the "mosaic of the doves", the room also features the famous "mosaic of the scenic masks".
- Placed in the center, the statue of a girl with a dove (marble, Roman copy of a Hellenistic original from the 2nd century BC), a figurative motif that finds a possible antecedent in the reliefs of the Greek funerary stele of the 5th and 4th century BC.

=== Cabinet of Venus ===
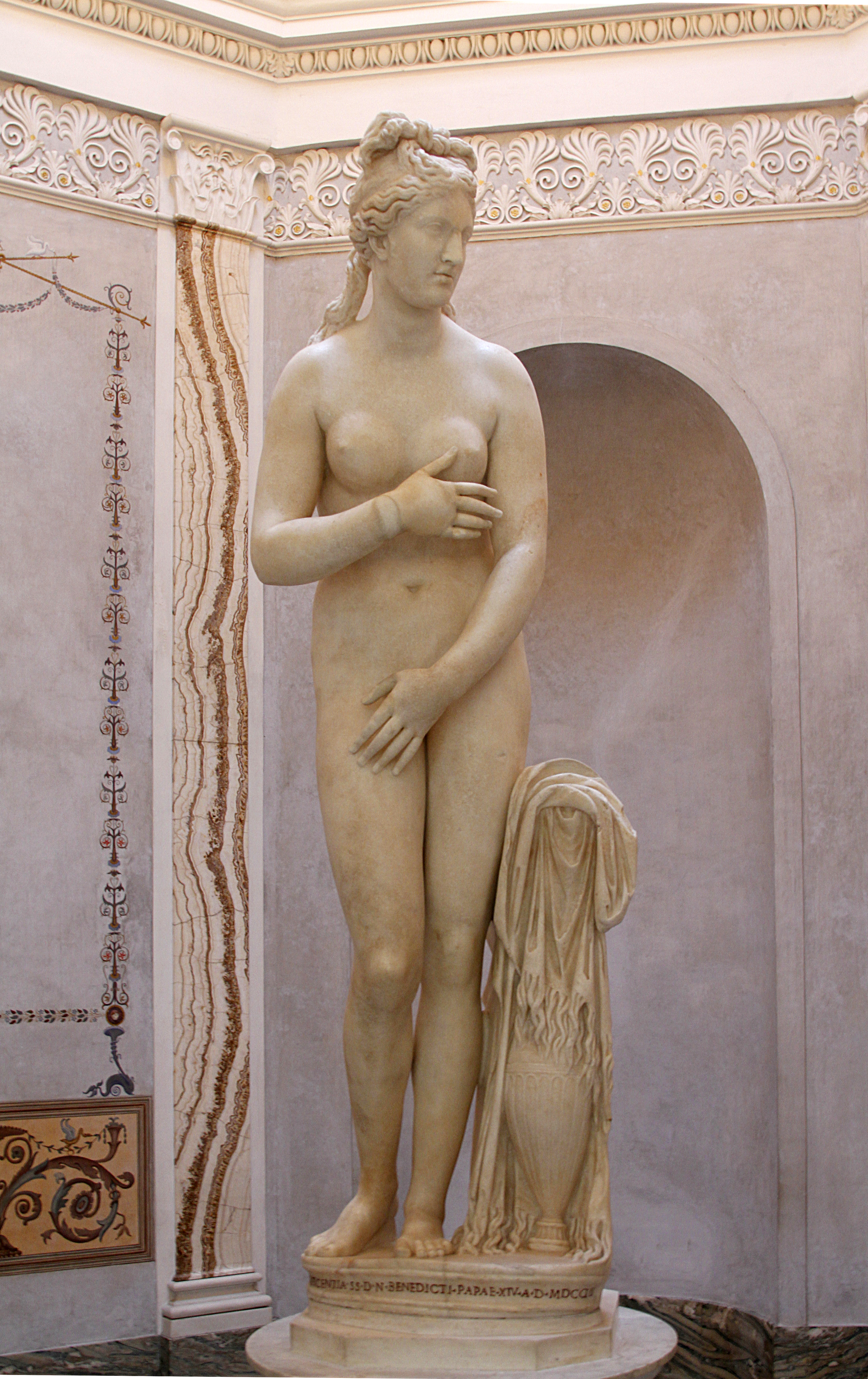
The Capitoline Venus, one of several Venus Pudica (modest Venus); 4th century AD, height: 193 cm

This small polygonal room, similar to a nymphaeum, frames the statue called Capitoline Venus, found during the pontificate of Clement X (1670–1676) at the basilica of San Vitale; according to Pietro Santi Bartoli the statue was located inside some ancient rooms together with other sculptures. Pope Benedict XIV bought the statue from the Stazi family in 1752 and donated it to the Capitoline Museum. After being taken to Paris in 1797, following the Treaty of Tolentino, it was returned to the Capitoline Museum in 1816. The Venus has slightly larger dimensions than life (h. 193 cm) and is made of a precious marble (probably Parian marble); the statue is an example of Venus pudica, represented emerging from the bath while covering her pubis and breasts. The sculpture, which is today one of the most famous in the museum, appears in all its beauty inside this 19th century room that opens onto the gallery, in an evocative and ethereal setting.

=== Hall of the Emperors ===
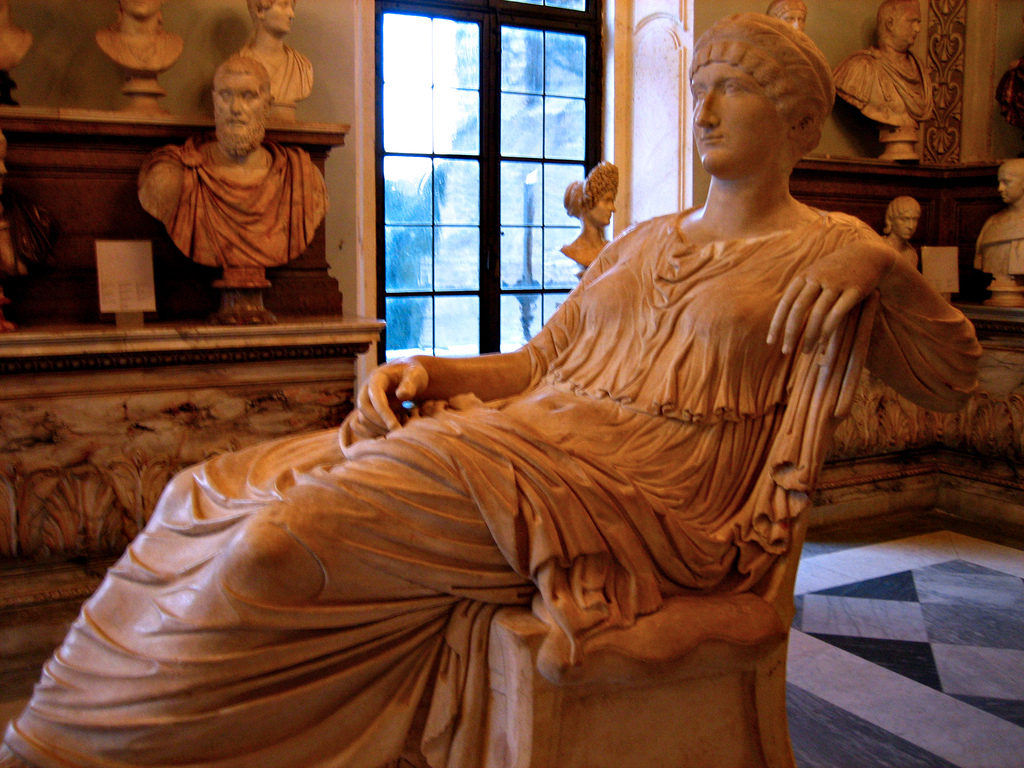
The statue of Helena, mother of Constantine I

The Hall of the Emperors is one of the oldest rooms in the Capitoline Museum. Since the exhibition areas opened to the public in 1734, the curators wanted to arrange, collected in a single room, the portraits of the Roman emperors and the people of their circle. The current layout is the result of various reworkings carried out over the last century. The room houses 67 portrait busts, a seated female statue (in the center), 8 reliefs and a modern honorary epigraph.

The portraits are arranged on two levels of marble shelves; the tour route unfolds in a helical fashion and clockwise, starting from the upper shelf entering on the left, to end at the end of the lower shelf on the right. The visitor can thus chronologically follow the evolution of Roman portraiture from the Republican Age to the Late Antiquity, and appreciate the evolution in the different hairstyles and beards).

In the center of the room is the statue of Flavia Julia Helena, augusta of the Roman Empire, concubine (or perhaps wife) of the emperor Constantius Chlorus, as well as mother of the emperor Constantine I. Catholics venerate her as Saint Helena the Empress.

Among the most remarkable portraits are those of Augustus as a young man with a laurel wreath and Augustus as an adult of the "Azio type", of Nero, of the emperors of the Flavian dynasty (Vespasian, Titus and Domitian) and of the Five Good Emperors (Trajan, Hadrian, Antoninus Pius, Marcus Aurelius as a young man and as an adult, Lucius Verus, Commodus as a young man and as an adult).

The Severan dynasty is also well represented with portraits of Septimius Severus, Geta, Caracalla as well as those of Heliogabalus, Maximinus Thrax, Trajan Decius, Marcus Aurelius Probus and Diocletian. The series ends with Honorius, son of Theodosius.

=== Hall of the Philosophers ===
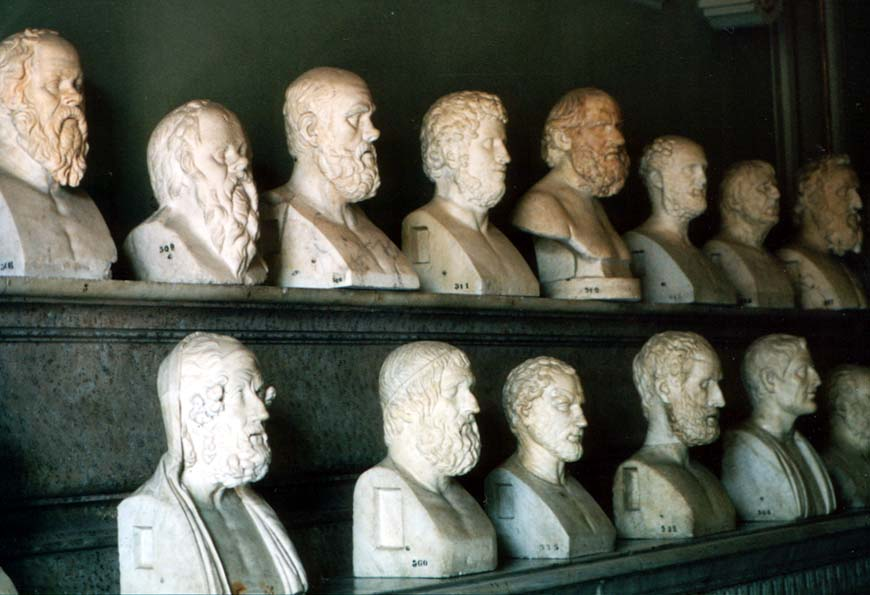
Busts of Capitoline philosophers

As in the case of the "Hall of the Emperors", the Hall of the Philosophers was also born, at the time of the foundation of the Capitoline Museum, from the desire to collect portraits, busts and herms, of poets, philosophers and rhetoricians of antiquity. The hall contains 79 of them. The itinerary begins with the most famous poet of antiquity, Homer, represented as an old man with a beard, flowing hair and a dull look, indicative of blindness. Next comes Pindar, another famous Greek poet, Pythagoras, with his turban on his head, and Socrates with a fleshy nose similar to that of a Silenus. The great Athenian tragedians are also present: Aeschylus, Sophocles and Euripides.

Among the many characters of the Greek world, some portraits from the Roman era are also exhibited; among these Marcus Tullius Cicero, the famous statesman and man of letters, depicted as a little over fifty years old in the prime of his intellectual and political faculties.

=== Hall ===
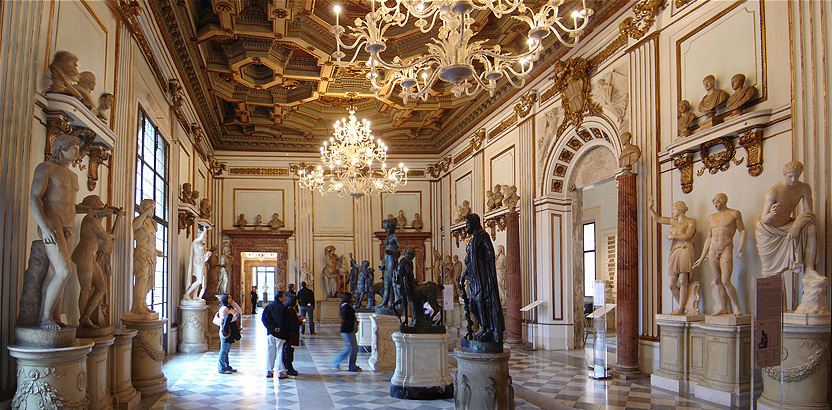
The Hall of Palazzo Nuovo

The Hall of Palazzo Nuovo is the most monumental space in the entire Capitoline museum complex. The large portal that opens into the long wall communicating with the Gallery, designed by Filippo Barigioni in the first half of the eighteenth century, is arched, with two winged Victories of fine workmanship. At the sides and in the center of the hall, on high and ancient bases, are the large bronze statues, among which the sculptures in gray marble of the Old Centaur and the Young Centaur (found in Hadrian's Villa and purchased by Pope Clement XIII for the Capitoline collection in 1765) stand out. All around, on a second level, there are shelves with a series of busts (such as one of Trajan, a copy from the sixteenth century). There are also some statues of Roman emperors such as the Marcus Aurelius in military dress (dating back to 161–180, from the Albani collection), the Augustus holding the world in his hand (with a body copied from the Diadumenos by Polycletus) and the Hadrian-Mars (from the Albani collection).

The Gallery also houses numerous other statues: Asclepius (in grey-brown marble, a 2nd-century copy of an early Hellenistic original; Albani collection); an Apollo of the Omphalos (from a Greek version of 470–460 BC by the sculptor Calamis; Albani collection); a Hermes (a Roman marble copy of Lysippos, from Hadrian's Villa); a statue of Pothos, restored as Apollo Citharoidus (Kitharoidos, a Roman copy after a Greek original by Skopas); Marcus Aurelius and Faustina Minor (the parents of the emperor Commodus, revisited as Mars and Venus and datable to about 187–189); a young satyr (2nd-century copy after a late Hellenistic original; Albani collection); a "hunter with hare" (dating to the time of Gallienus; found in 1747 near Porta Latina); Harpocrates, son of Isis and Osiris (found in the Pecile of Hadrian's Villa and donated to the Capitoline collection by Pope Benedict XIV in 1744); Athena promachos (copy of a prototype from the 5th century BC attributed to Plicleto Albani collection); and many others.

=== Hall of the Faun ===
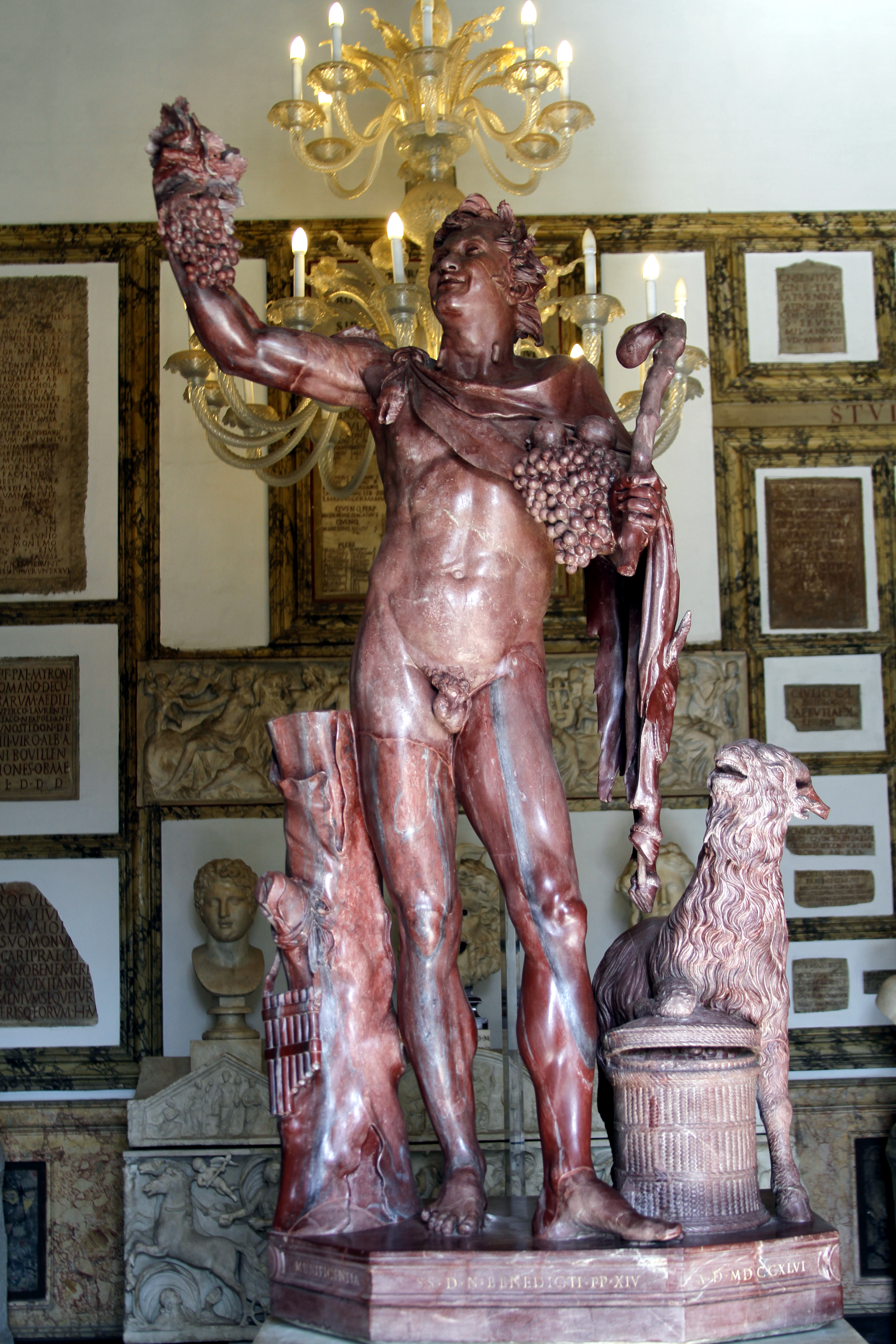
The Red Faun; 2nd century AD, height: 167.5 cm

The room takes its name from the sculpture that has been in the center of the room since 1817, the Red Faun from Hadrian's Villa. The statue of the Faun was found in 1736 and restored by Clemente Bianchi and Bartolomeo Cavaceppi. It was purchased by the museum in 1746 and very quickly became one of the most appreciated works by visitors of that century. Among the epigraphic texts, the Lex de imperio Vespasiani from the 1st century is important (a decree that confers particular power to the emperor Vespasian).

=== Hall of the Galatian ===
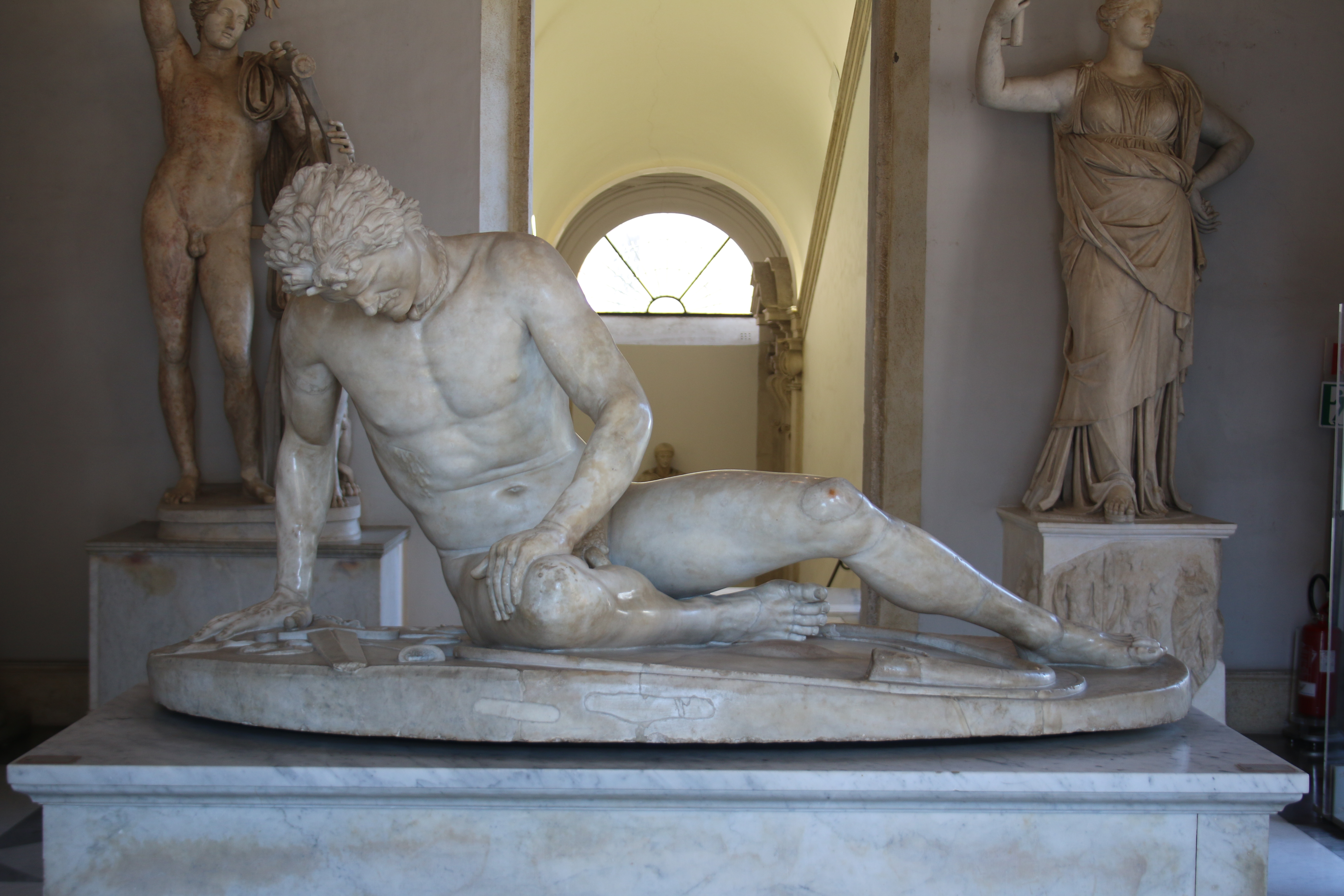
The Dying Gaul 230–220 BC

This Hall takes its name from the central sculpture, the "Dying Gaul", a 3rd-century Roman copy of the 3rd-century BC Greek bronze original, part of the Donarium of Attalus, a triumphal monument on the acropolis of Pergamon commissioned by Attalus I to celebrate his victory over the Galatians. Purchased in 1734 by Cardinal Ludovico Ludovisi by Alessandro Gregorio Capponi, president of the Capitoline Museum, it was mistakenly believed to portray a gladiator in the act of falling on his shield and became perhaps the most famous work in the collections, replicated several times in engravings and drawings.

The Gaul is surrounded by other Roman copies of Greek originals of notable quality: the Wounded Amazon, the statue of Hermes-Antinous (purchased by Cardinal Albani from Pope Clement XII around 1734, from Hadrian's Villa), and the Satyr at Rest (from an original by Praxiteles of the 4th century BC, donated by Pope Benedict XIV to the Capitoline Museums in 1753), while against the window, the delightful rococo group of Cupid and Psyche symbolises the tender union of the human soul with divine love, according to a theme dating back to Platonic philosophy which enjoyed great success in artistic production since early Hellenism. Then there are the busts of the caesaricide Marcus Junius Brutus and the Macedonian leader Alexander the Great (marble, Roman copy of a Hellenistic original made between the 3rd and 2nd century BC approximately).

The Wounded Amazon (from an original of the 5th century BC, from Villa d'Este in Tivoli, within the perimeter of Hadrian's Villa) is also called the "Sosikles type", from the signature on this replica. Generally attributed to Polycletus (or to Phidias), it has slightly larger dimensions than life. The raised arm is the result of a restoration, perhaps originally brandishing a spear on which the figure was leaning. The head is turned to the right, the left arm instead raises the drapery showing the wound. It was donated by Benedict XIV to the Capitoline Museums in 1753.

== The Galleria Lapidaria and the Tabularium ==
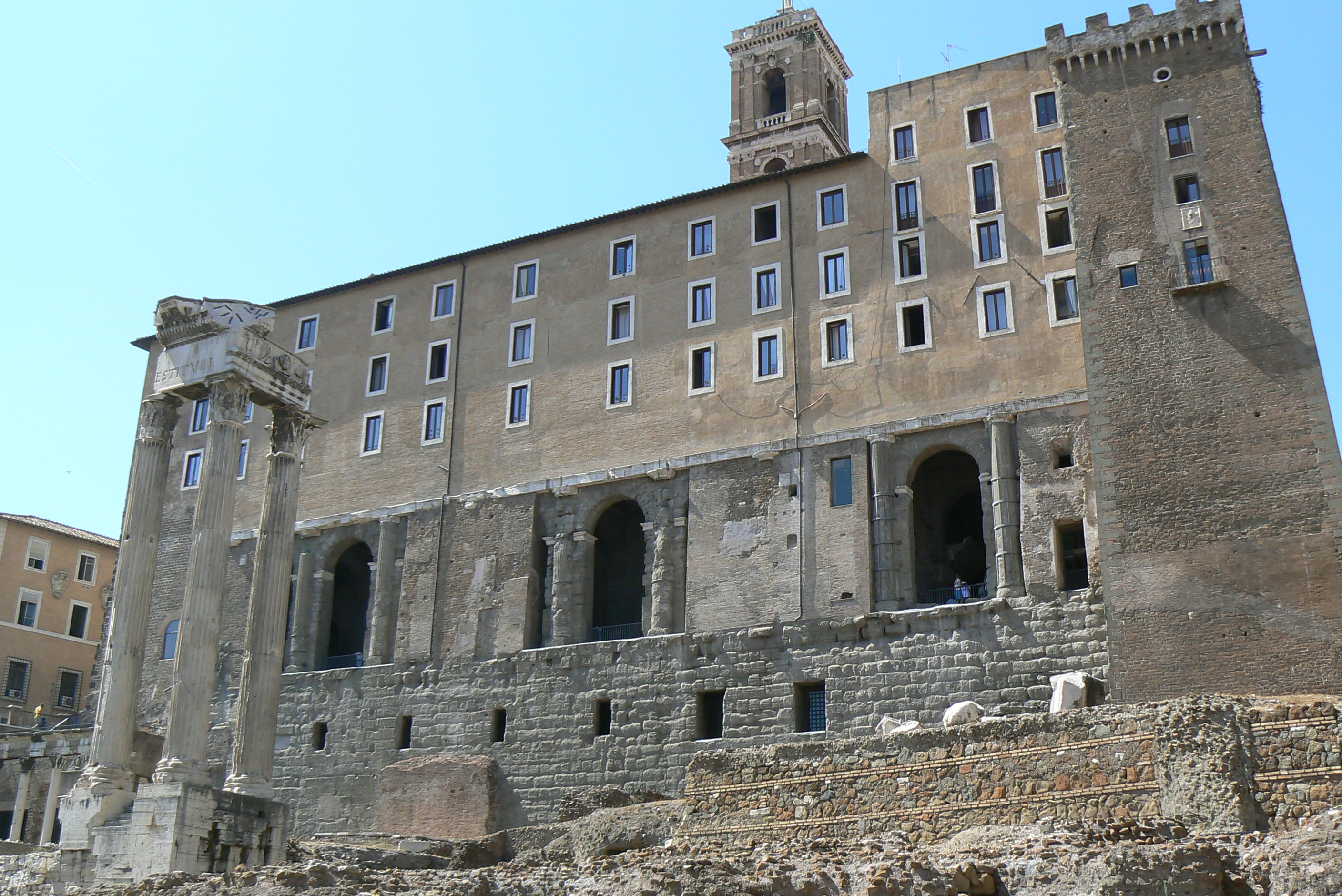
The Tabularium with the Palazzo Senatorio superimposed. In the foreground the remains of the Temple of Vespasian and Titus

The Tabularium building was intended to house the public archive of the State: the most important public documents of ancient Rome, from the decrees of the Roman Senate to the peace treaties. These documents were engraved on bronze "tabulae" (hence the name "tabularium" for any archive in the Roman world). The name of the Capitoline Hill, however, derives from an inscription, preserved in the building in the Renaissance, which mentions an archive: it could be one or more rooms, not necessarily a so-called "State archive" which occupied the entire complex. The archives of the state administration, among others, were scattered in various buildings of the city.

Currently the Tabularium is part of the Capitoline Museum complex and is accessible from the Galleria Lapidaria that connects Palazzo Nuovo to Palazzo dei Conservatori. The 73.60m long base, with walls in Volcanic Tuff from the Aniene and blocks of Peperite, supports the current Palazzo Senatorio, seat of the municipality of Rome. At first it was possible to access the Tabularium from the Forum via a staircase of 67 steps, still well preserved, but at the time of Domitian with the construction of the Temple of Vespasian the entrance to the forum was blocked.

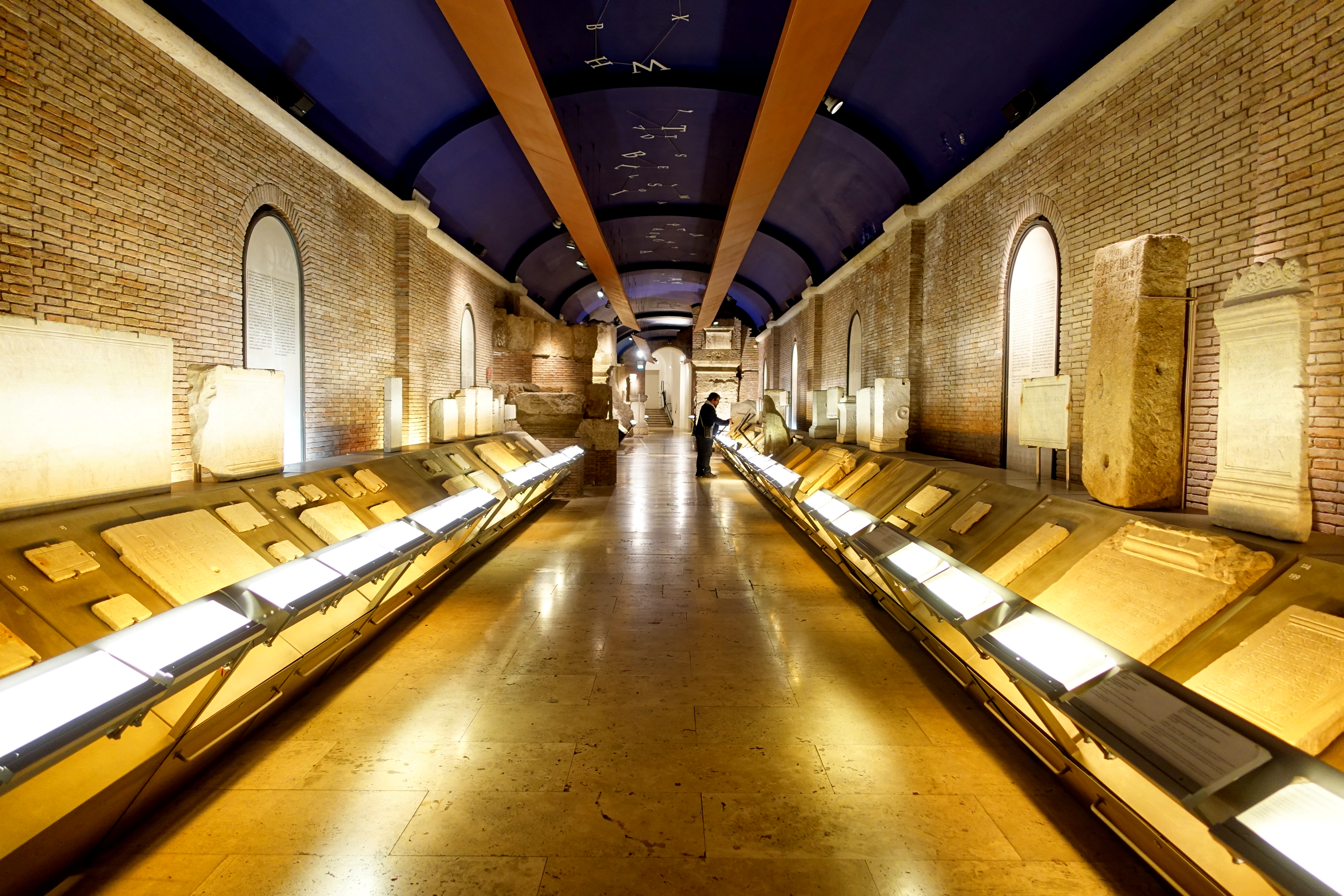
View of the Galleria Lapidaria

The Galleria Lapidaria is an underground gallery, excavated in the 1930s under the Piazza del Campidoglio to connect the Capitoline buildings. On both sides of the gallery are exhibited 130 inscriptions from the Greco-Roman civilization period. Among the numerous inscriptions, that of the ex-voto to the goddess Celestis for a good journey (3rd century) is preserved. The text of the dedication reads: "A Caelestis victoriosa Iovinus fulfilled his vow".

In the underground, at the end of the Galleria Lapidaria, there are also the Tabularium and the remains of the temple of Veiovis.

== Villa Caffarelli ==
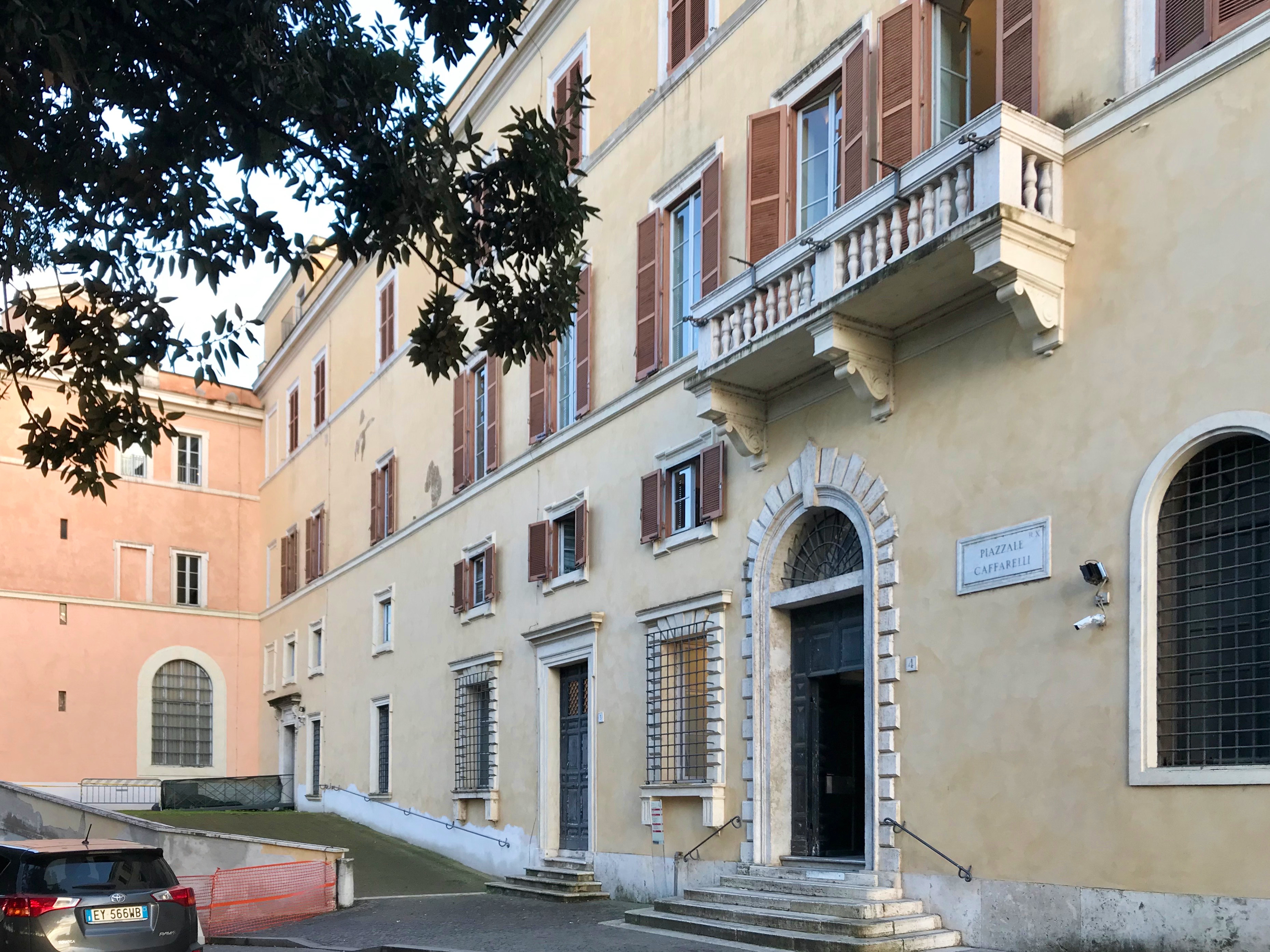
View of Villa Caffarelli

The sixteenth-century Palazzo Caffarelli al Campidoglio stands behind Palazzo dei Conservatori, on the southern side of the hill once occupied by the Temple of Capitoline Jupiter. To reach it, you have to walk along Via delle Tre Pile, at the end of which Piazzale Caffarelli, in front of the building, offers a view of Rome. From the belvedere, crossing a portal, you enter the Caffarelli Garden and from there the ground floor of the building; on the external corner of the building, ancient Roman bas-reliefs are reassembled, in particular the remains of the tomb of Publius Elio Gutta Calpurniano, a Roman charioteer from the 2nd century AD, discovered in the 19th century near Porta del Popolo.

=== Ground floor ===
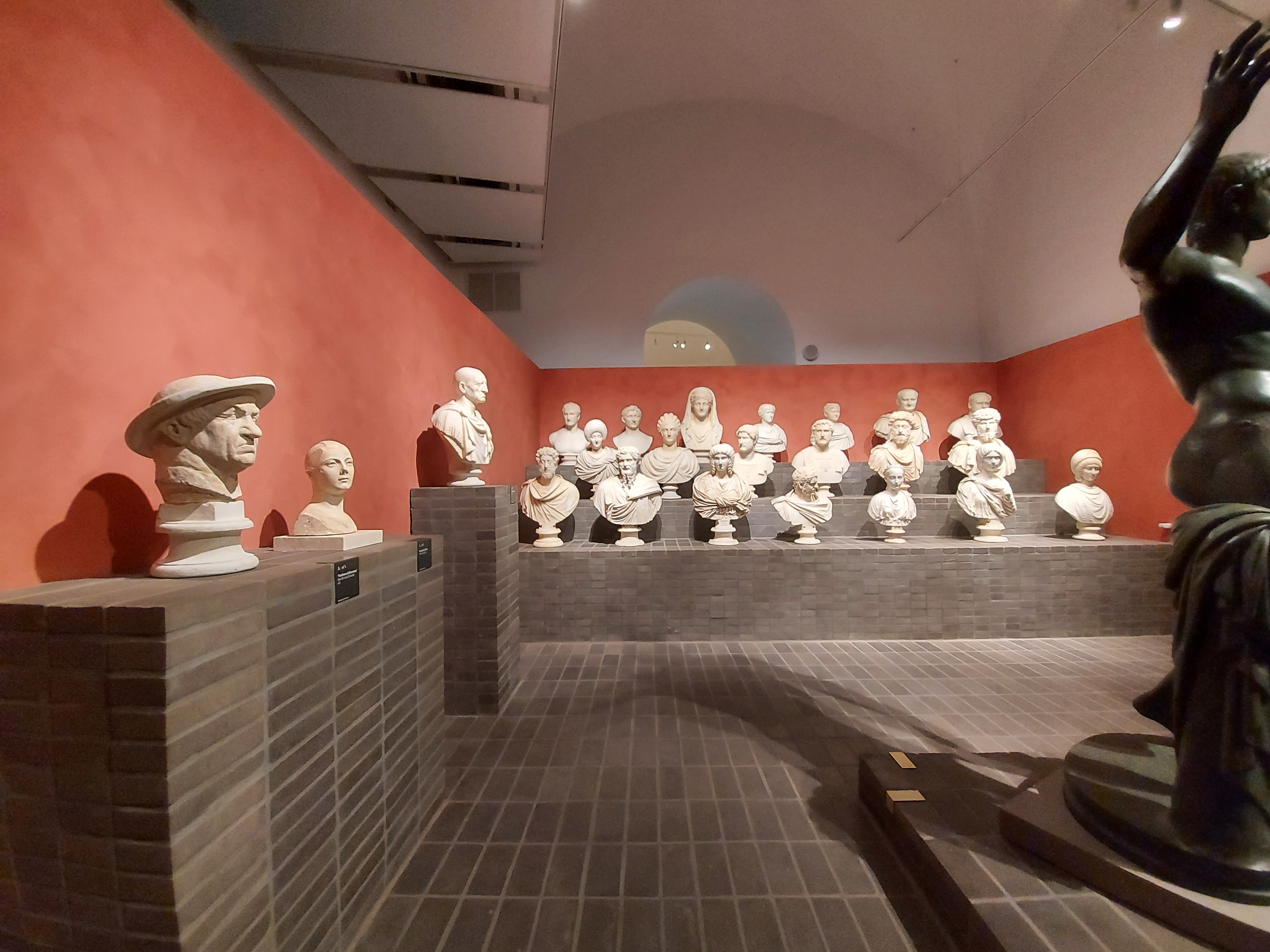
The exhibition dedicated to the Torlonia Collection

Since 2020, the ground floor has been reopened to the public as part of the Capitoline Museums dedicated to temporary specialized exhibitions, in an exhibition route that is divided into various rooms and ends by connecting to the first floor of Palazzo dei Conservatori in the area of the Temple of Jupiter and the exedra of Marcus Aurelius.

The first of these exhibitions exhibited statues from the Torlonia Collection (14 October 2020 – 27 February 2022).

=== First floor ===
The oldest part of the building, improperly called Palazzo Clementino in modern times, is adjacent to the second floor of Palazzo dei Conservatori and was included in the museum itinerary at the beginning of the 21st century.

This is where the Medagliere Capitolino, the collection of coins, medals and jewels of the Municipality, is located. The medal collection was created following a bequest by Ludovico Stanzani in 1872 and was constituted following the interest of Augusto Castellani. Two other groups were subsequently added to the collection: one of Roman and Byzantine aurei and solidi (from the Campana collection) and one of republican denarii (from the Giulio Bignami collection). It was found during the demolitions for the construction of Via dell'Impero (now Via dei Fori Imperiali) in the home of an antique dealer who had hidden it in his own house. The treasure consisted of 17 kilos of gold, including coins and jewels. The medal collection was opened to the public in 2003.

Adjacent to the medal collection are three other rooms, with the original wooden coffered ceilings and frescoed wall decorations, which arrived in precarious conditions due to the historical events of Palazzo Caffarelli and were later restored and included in the museum itinerary; in particular, the Sala di San Pietro (from the subject of one of the frescoes, a miracle performed in Jerusalem by Saint Peter). From this last room you enter the Hall of the Fronton, so called because it offers a reconstruction of the terracotta decorations that originally decorated the pediment of a Roman temple from the 2nd century BC, found in Via di San Gregorio and reassembled here in 2002.

=== Second floor ===
The second floor of Palazzo Caffarelli – like its ground floor – is dedicated to hosting temporary exhibitions.

== Centrale Montemartini ==
The Centrale Montemartini is a former power station of Acea (active as a power-station between the 1890s and 1930s) in southern Rome, between the Pyramid of Cestius and the Basilica of Saint Paul Outside the Walls, close to the Metro station Garbatella.

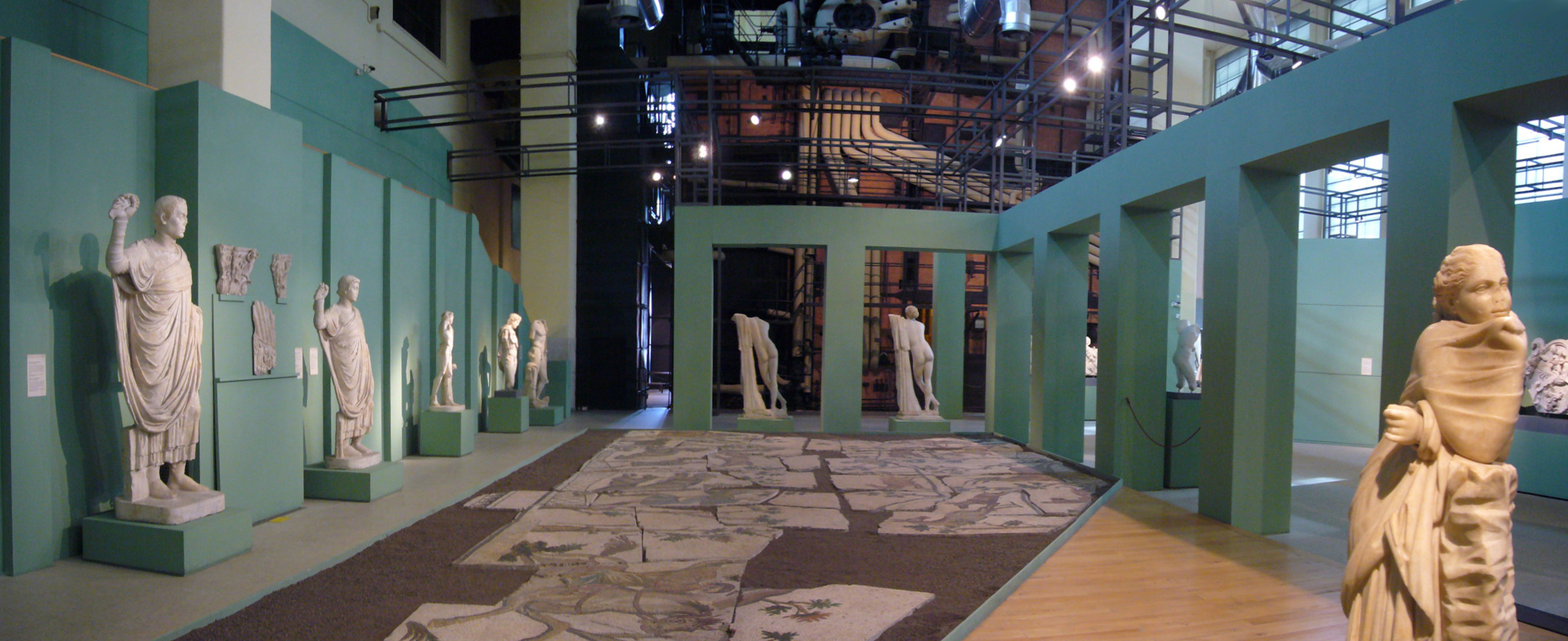
Boiler room and Mosaic of Santa Bibiana. The museum combines industrial architecture and classical art.

In 1997, the Centrale Montemartini was adapted to temporarily accommodate a part of the antique sculpture collection of the Capitoline museums, at that time closed for renovation; the temporary exhibition was so appreciated that the venue was eventually converted into a permanent museum.

Its permanent collection comprises 400 ancient statues, moved here during the reorganisation of the Capitoline Museums in 1997, along with tombs, busts, and mosaics. Many of them were excavated in the ancient Roman horti (e.g. the Gardens of Sallust) between the 1890s and 1930s, a fruitful period for Roman archaeology.

== Gallery ==
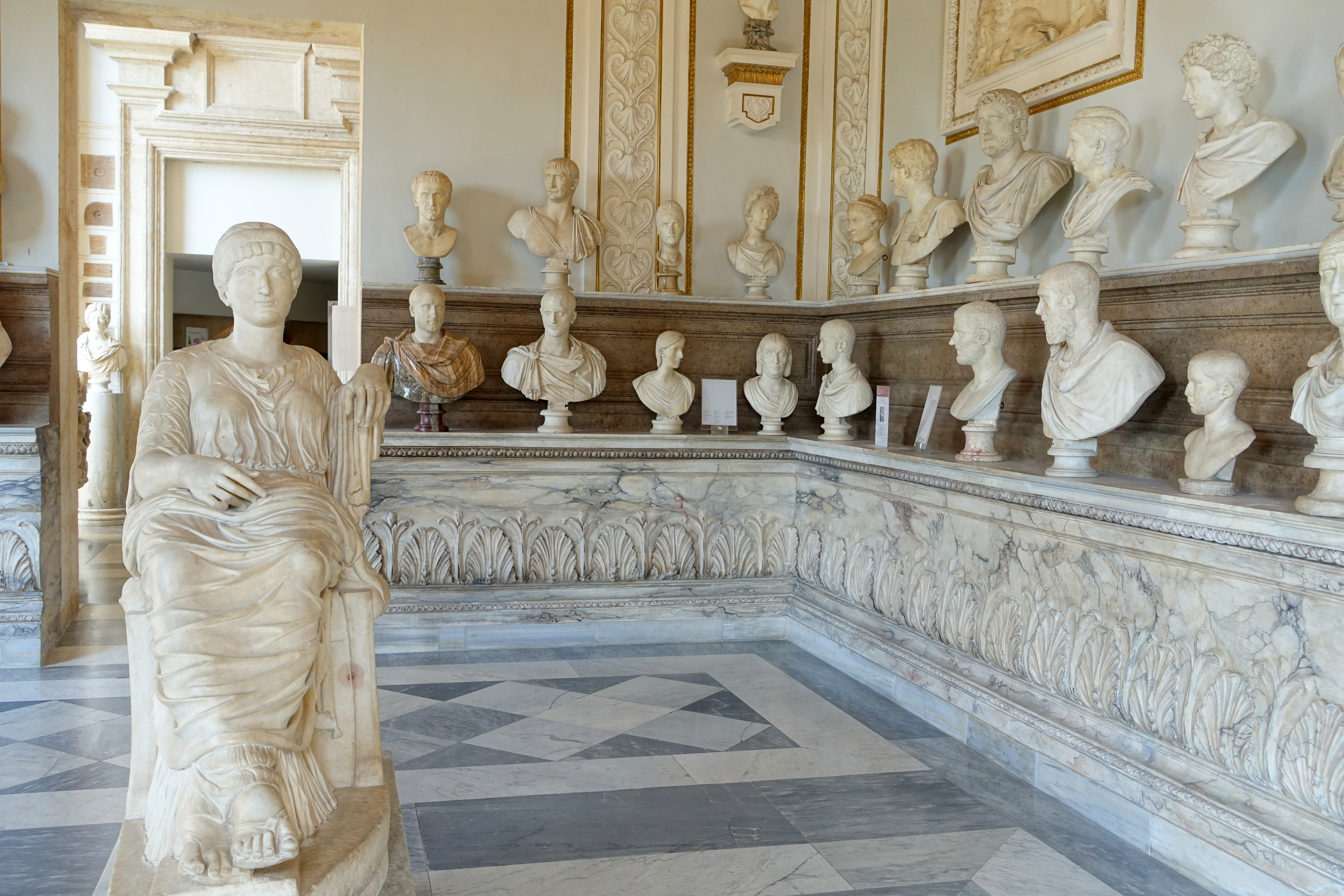
Panorama of busts displayed in the Hall of the Emperors of the Palazzo Nuovo, with the statue of Helena in the center

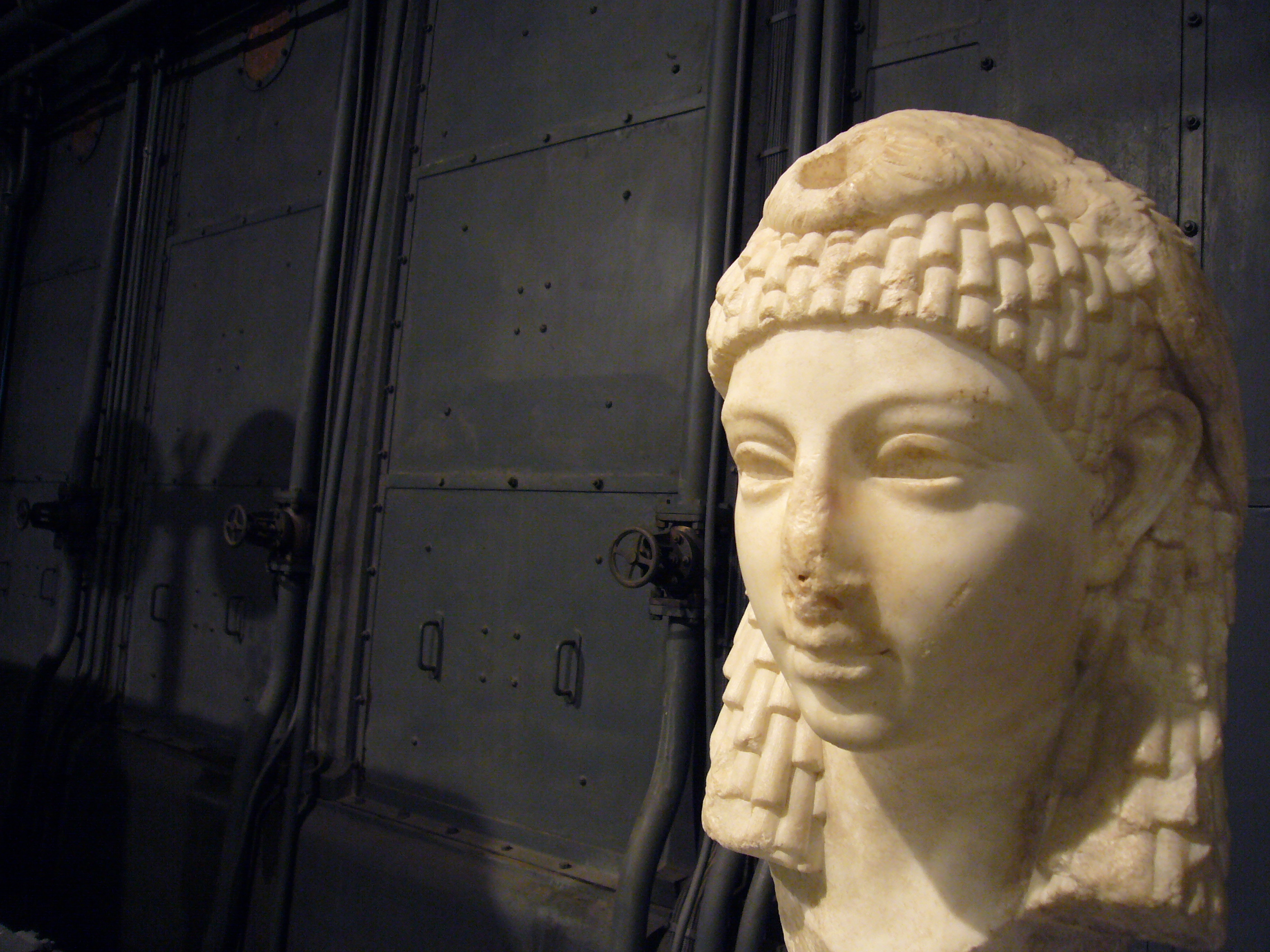
Bust of Cleopatra, Centrale Montemartini, Rome

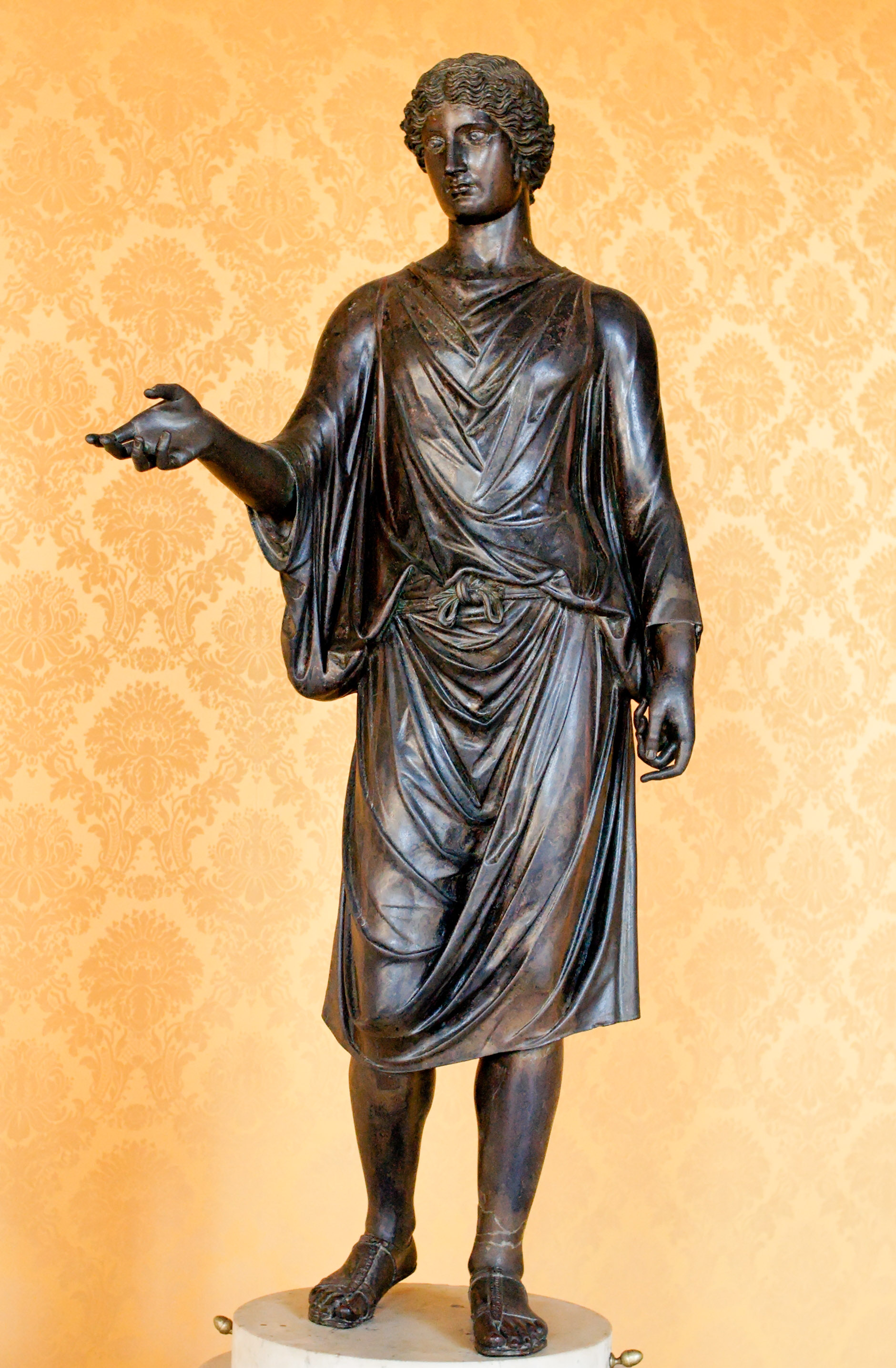
The Camillus, one of the founding pieces of the Capitoline collections, Roman bronze from the 1st century BC

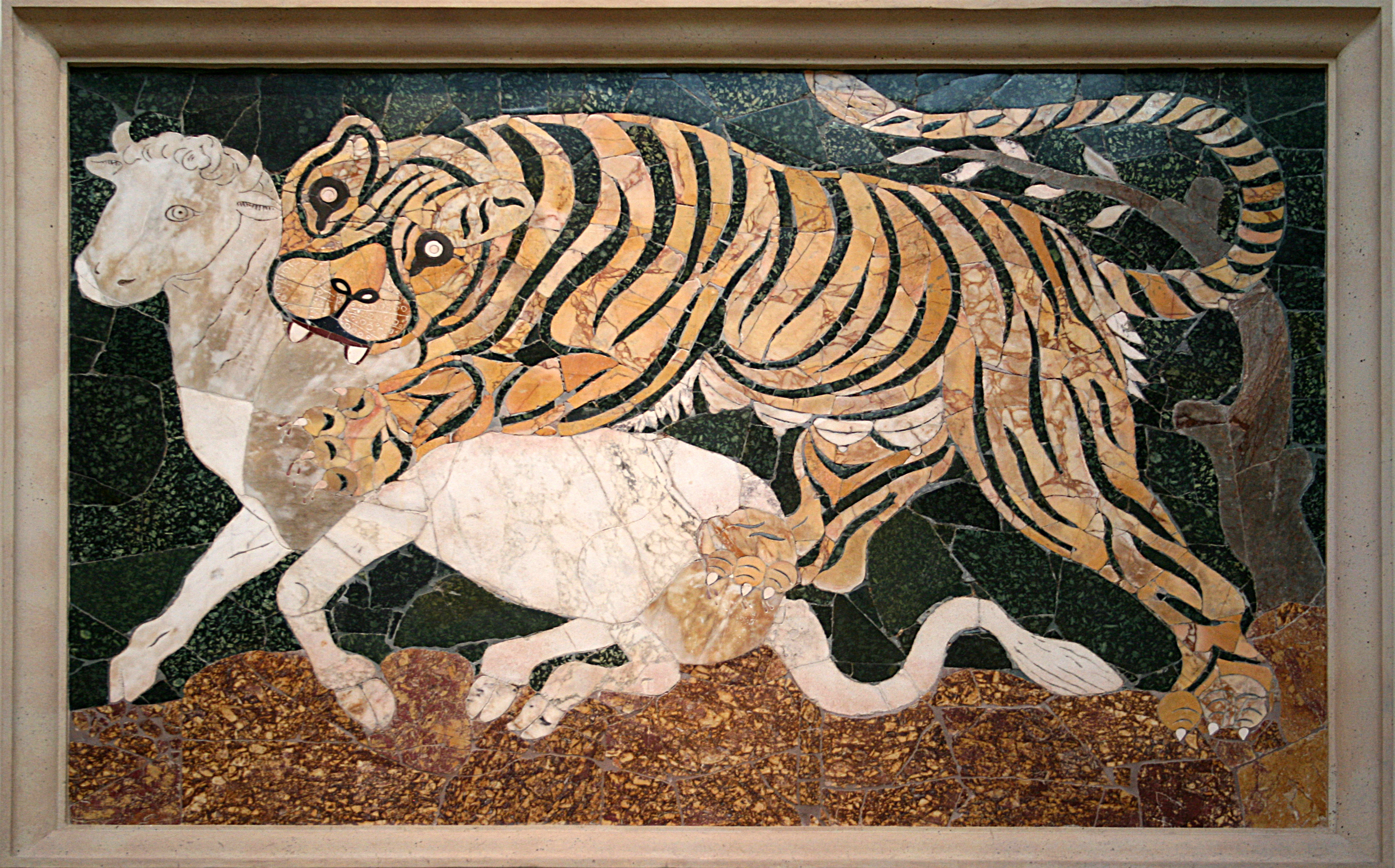
Mosaic. Tiger attacking a calf – Roman artwork from the 2d quarter of the 4th century AD

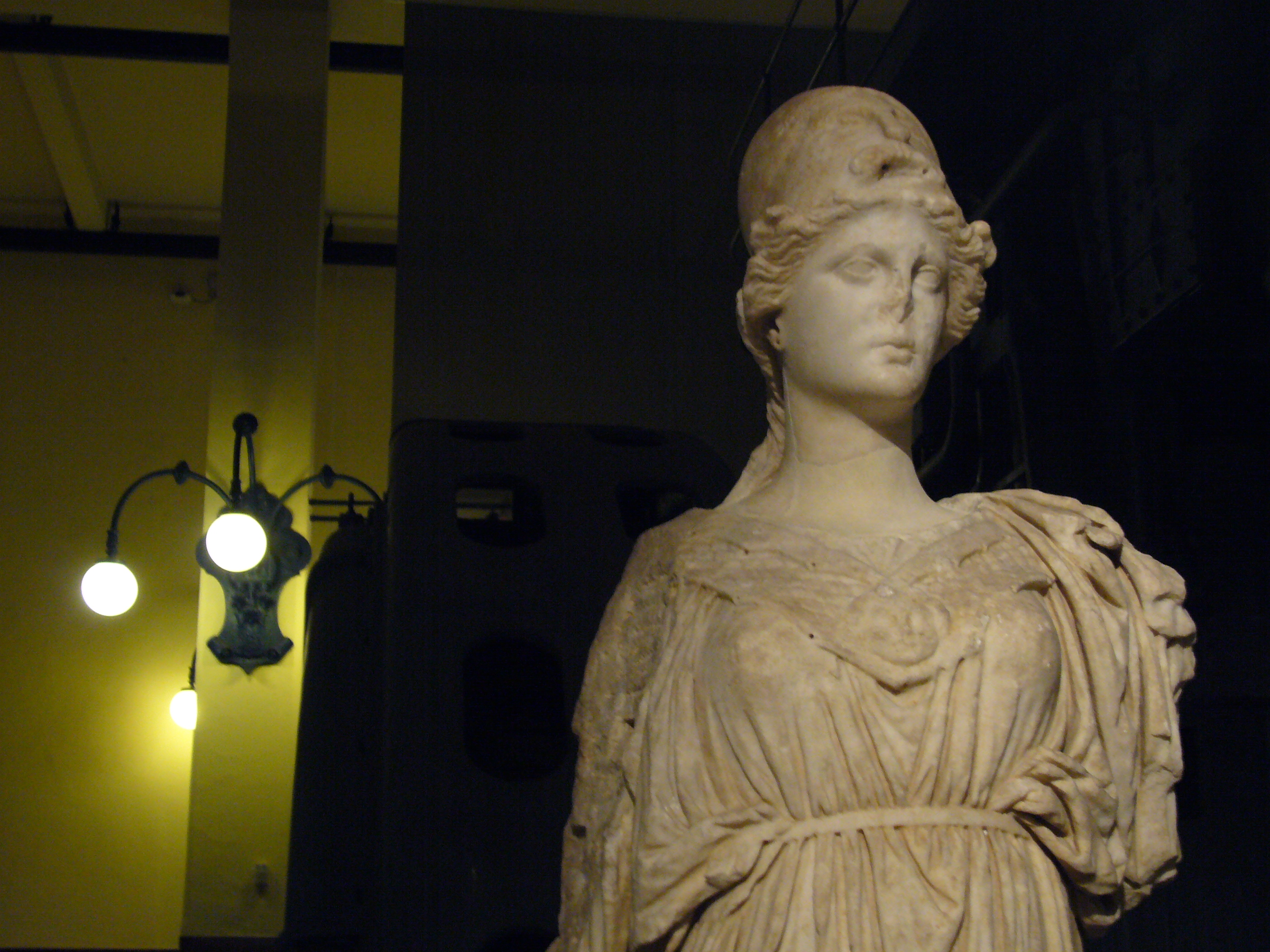
Statue of Athena, Centrale Montemartini, Rome

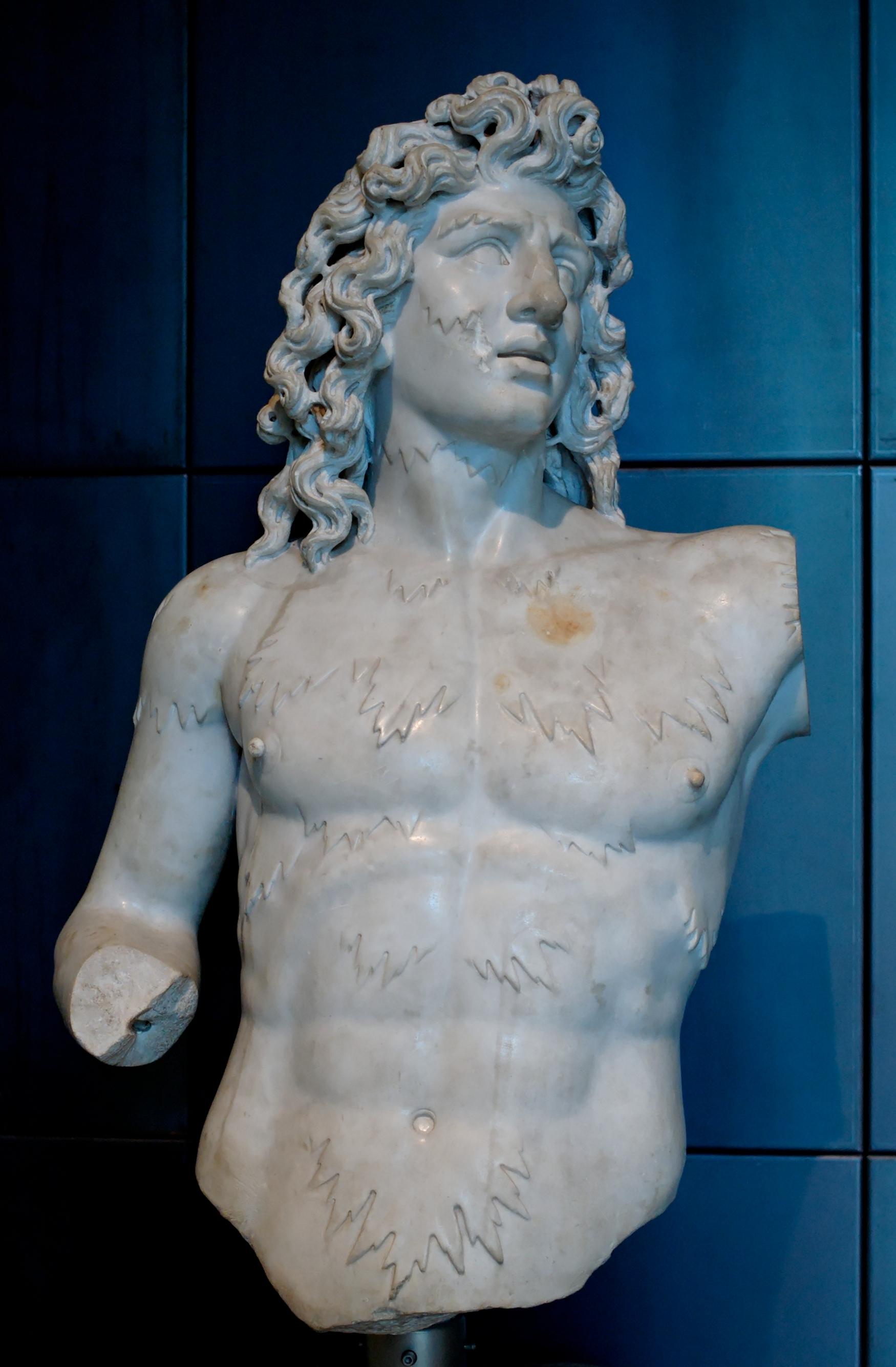
Triton or sea centaur, part of a group representing Commodus' apotheosis as Hercules. Luni marble, Roman artwork, 191–192 AD

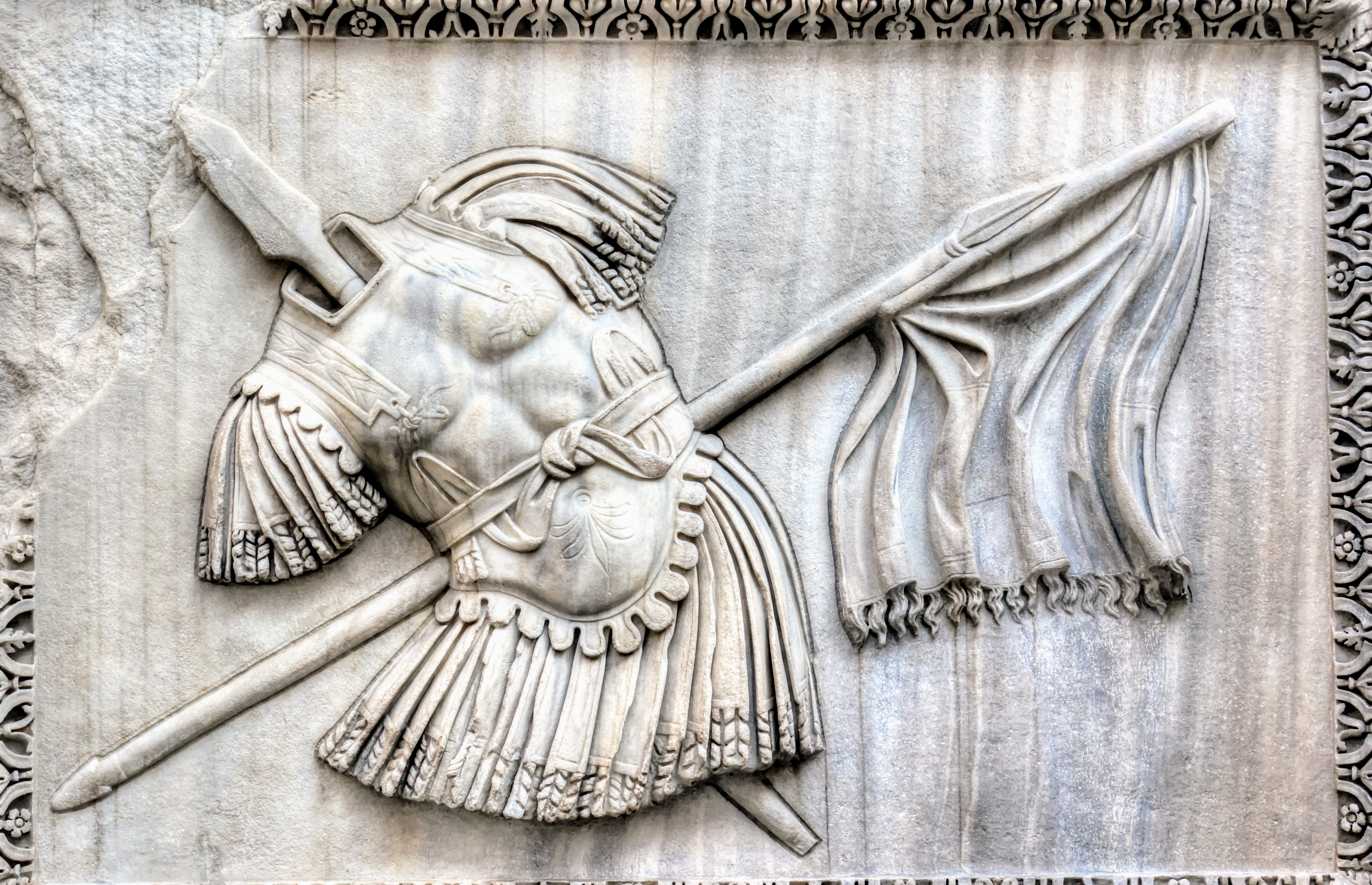
Roman Trophy, relief of the Temple of Hadrian on Campus Martius, displayed inside the museum courtyard

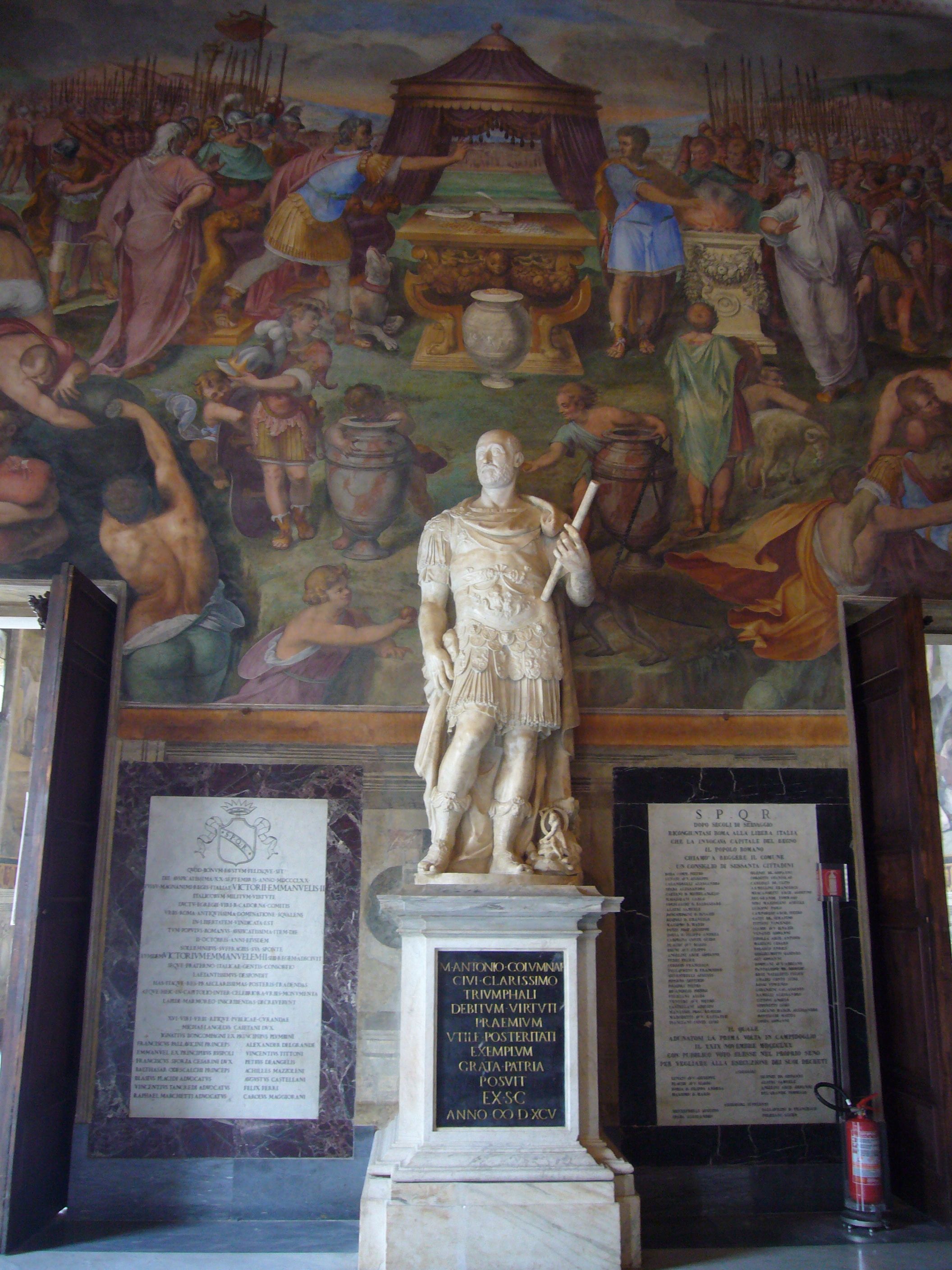
Hall of the Captains, statue of Marcantonio Colonna

Courtyard of the Capitoline Museum
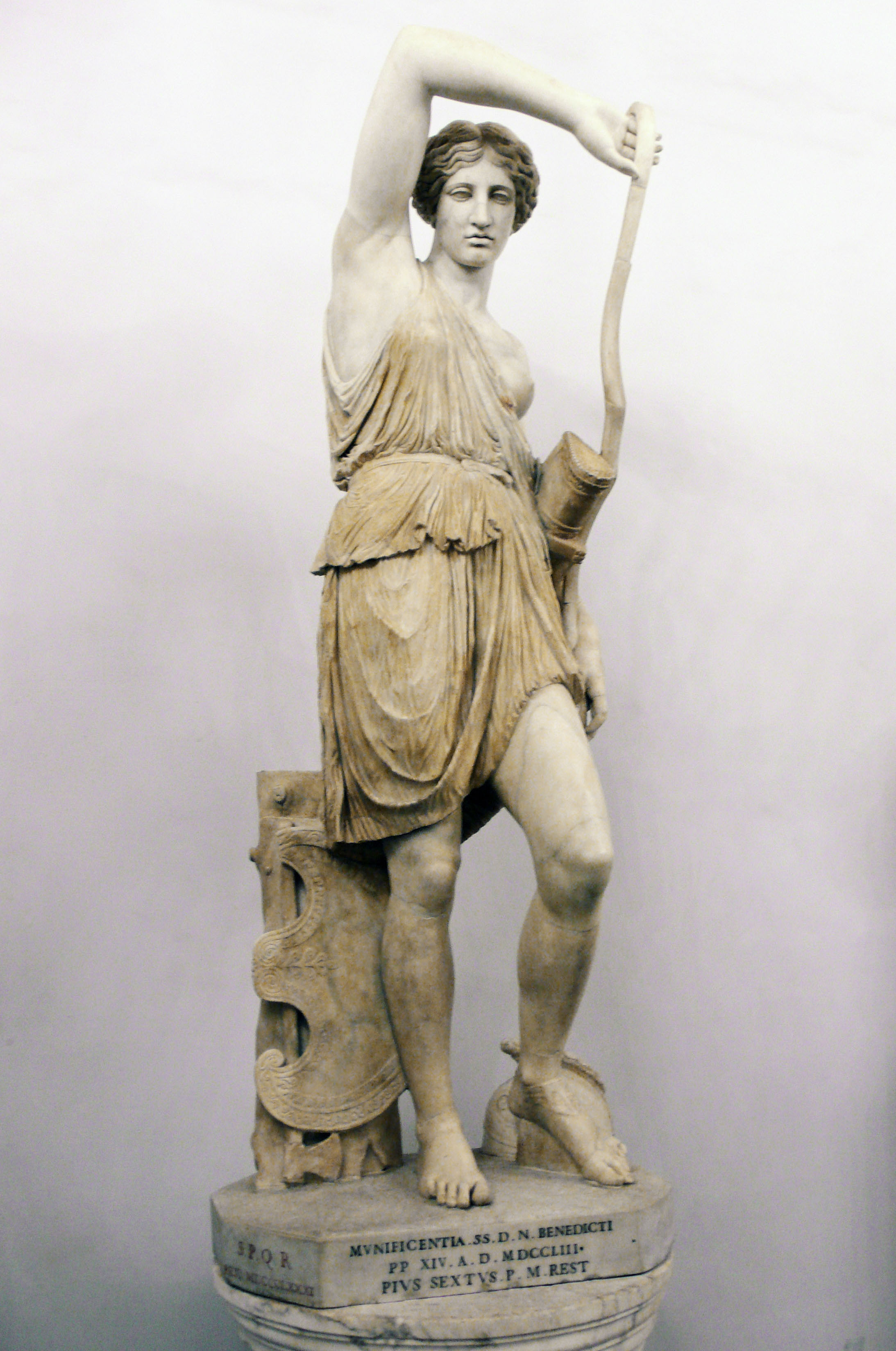
The Wounded Amazon, copy from original work by Phidias

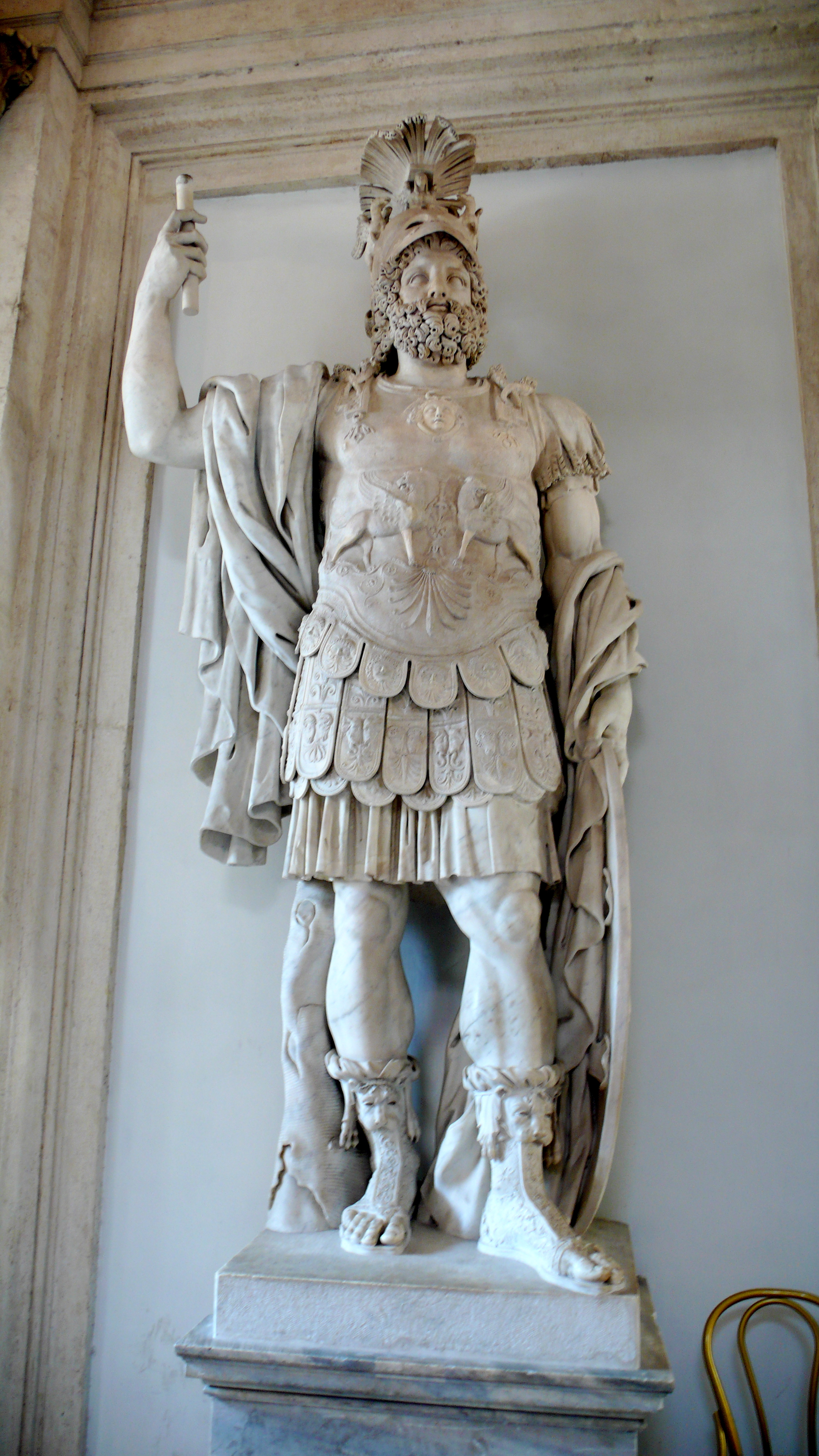
Statue of Mars, God of War.

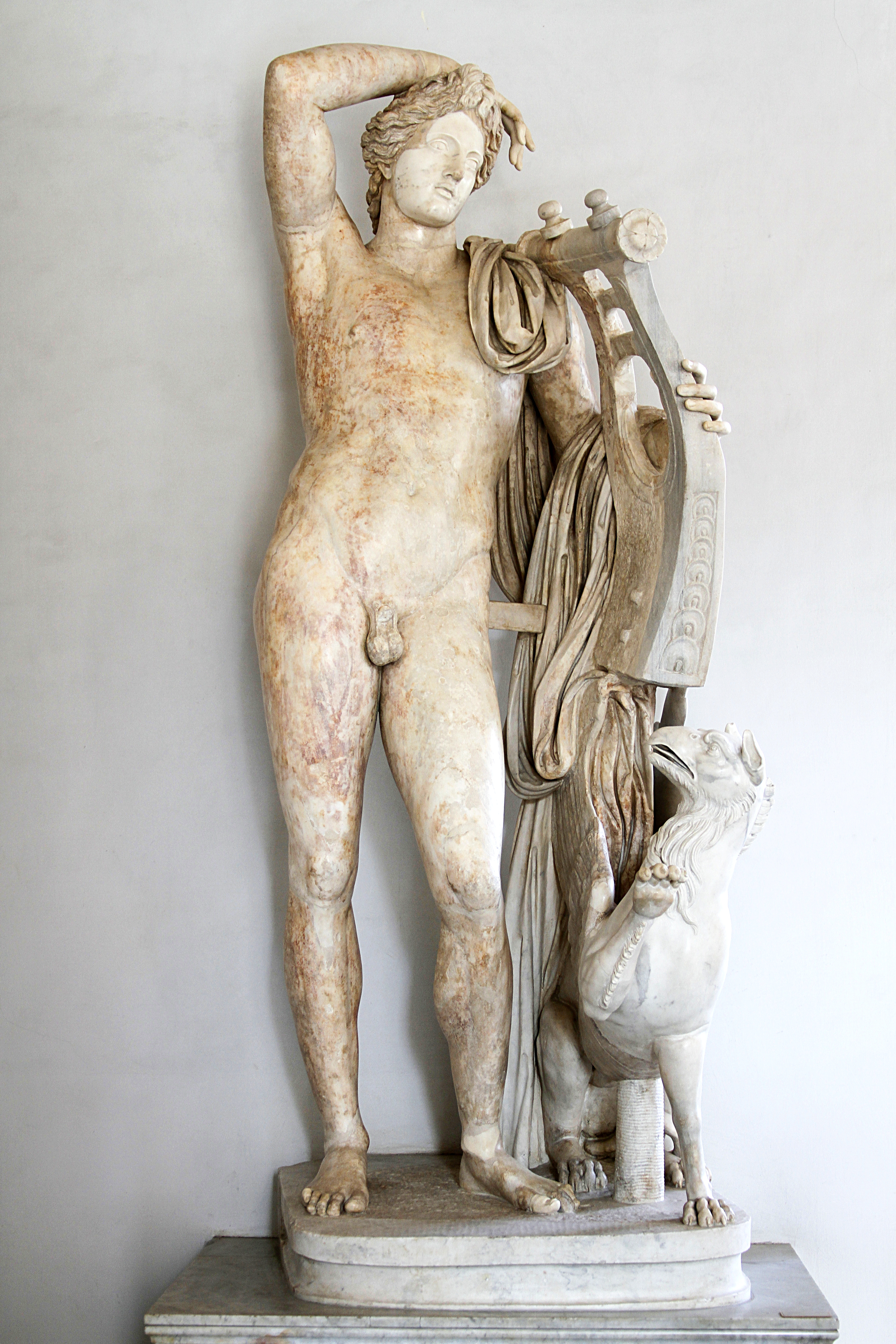
Apollo Citharoedus

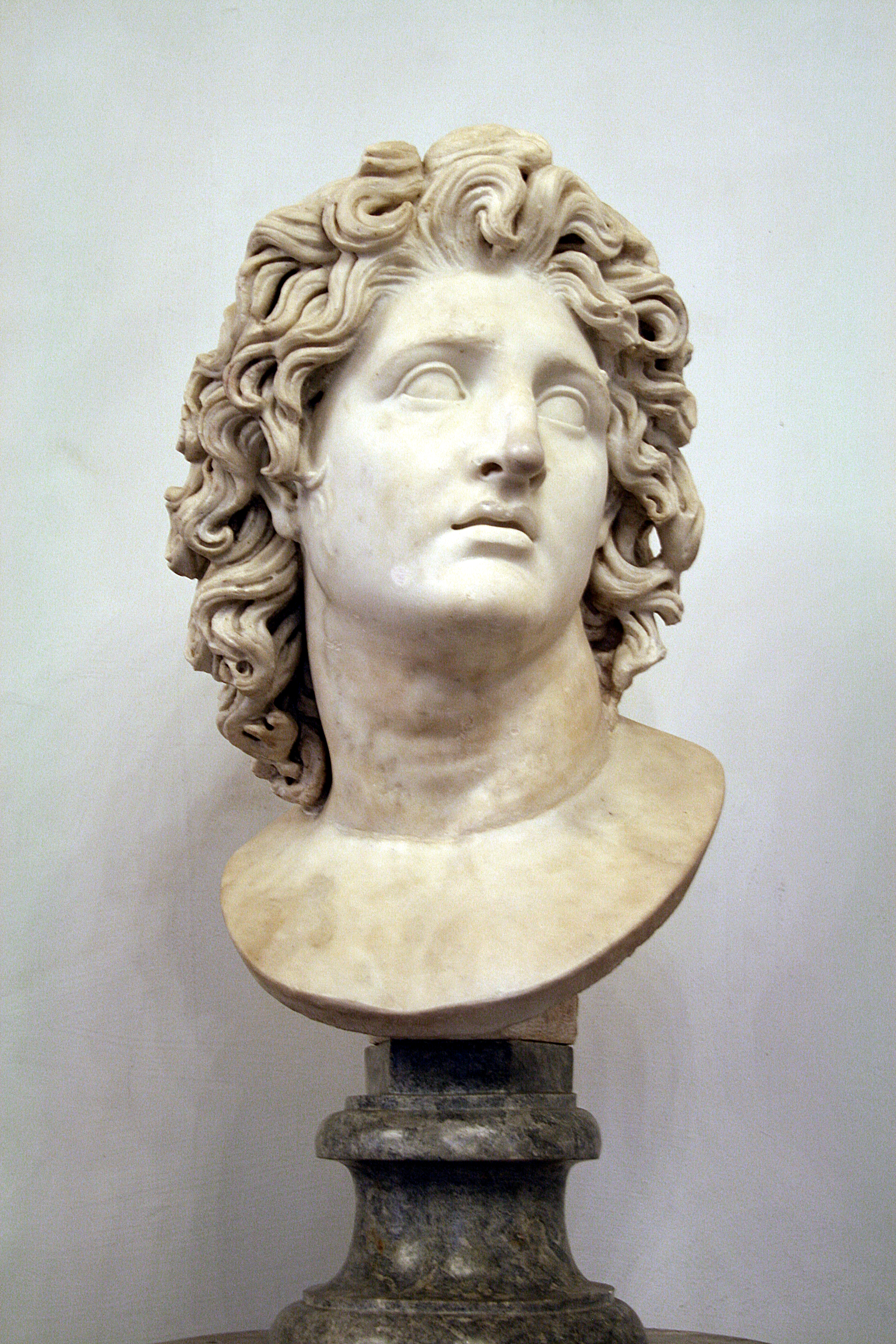
Bust of Alexander the Great as an eidolon of Helios

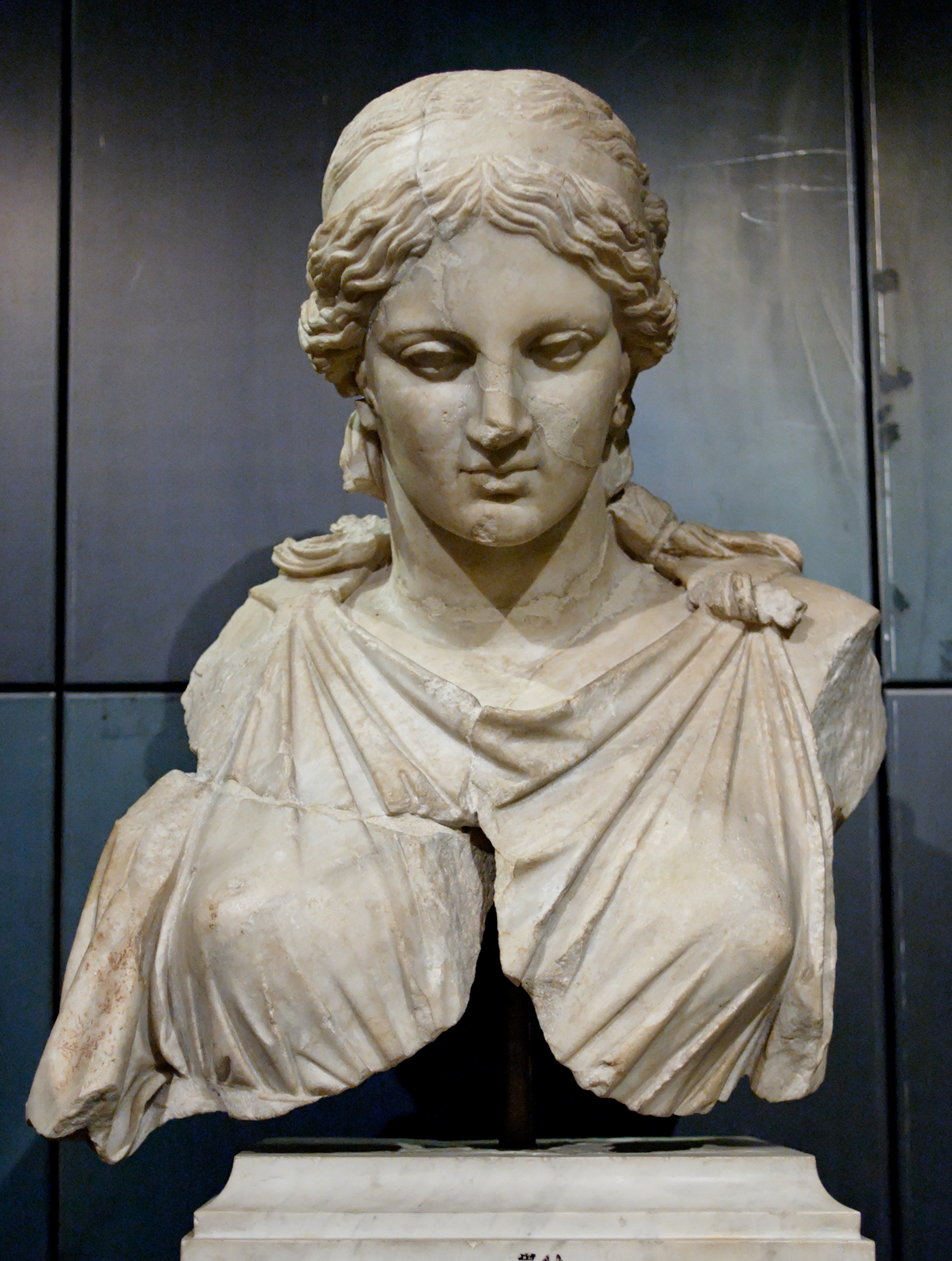
Probably a copy of the statue of Artemis by Kephisodotos

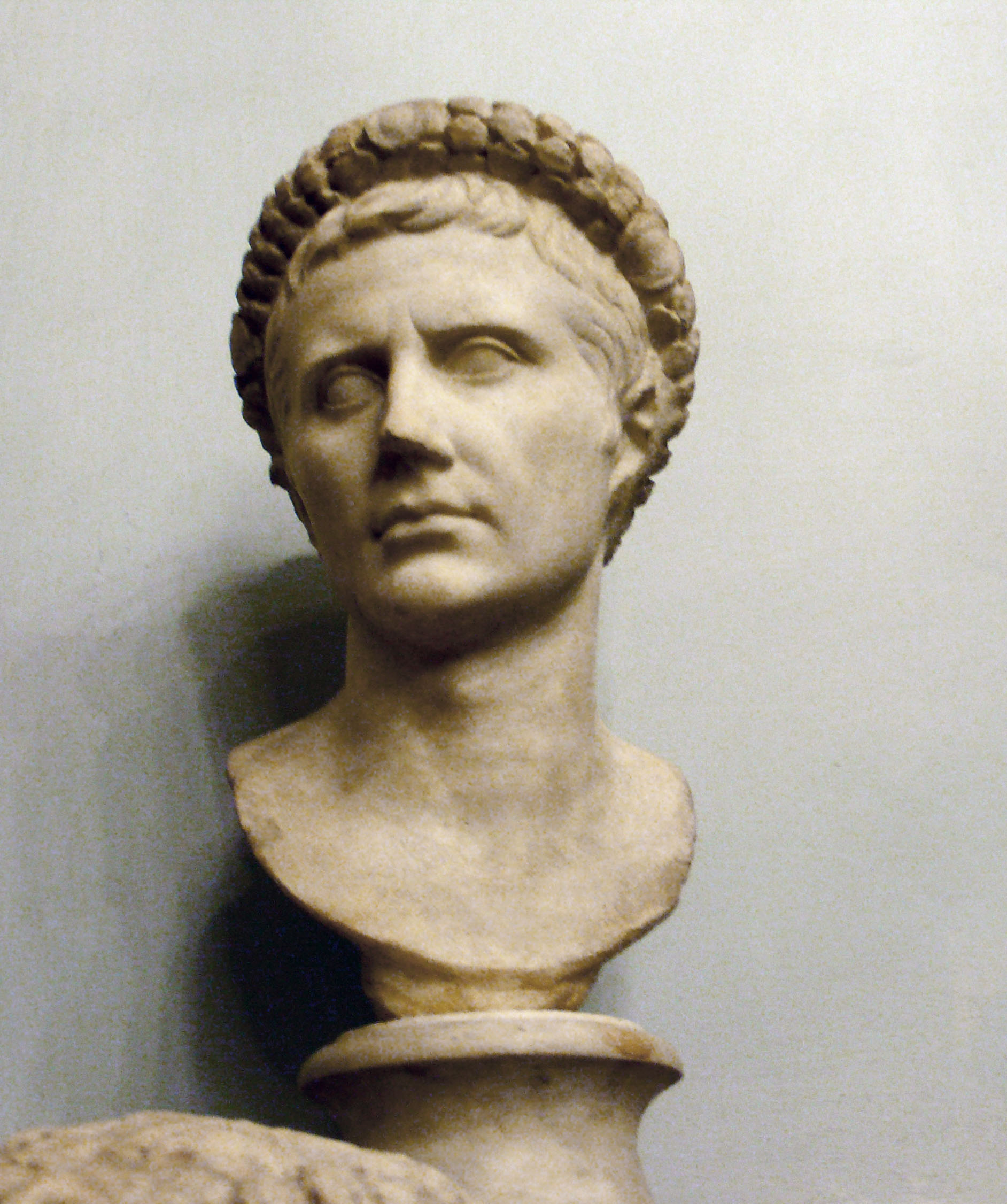
Bust of Augustus

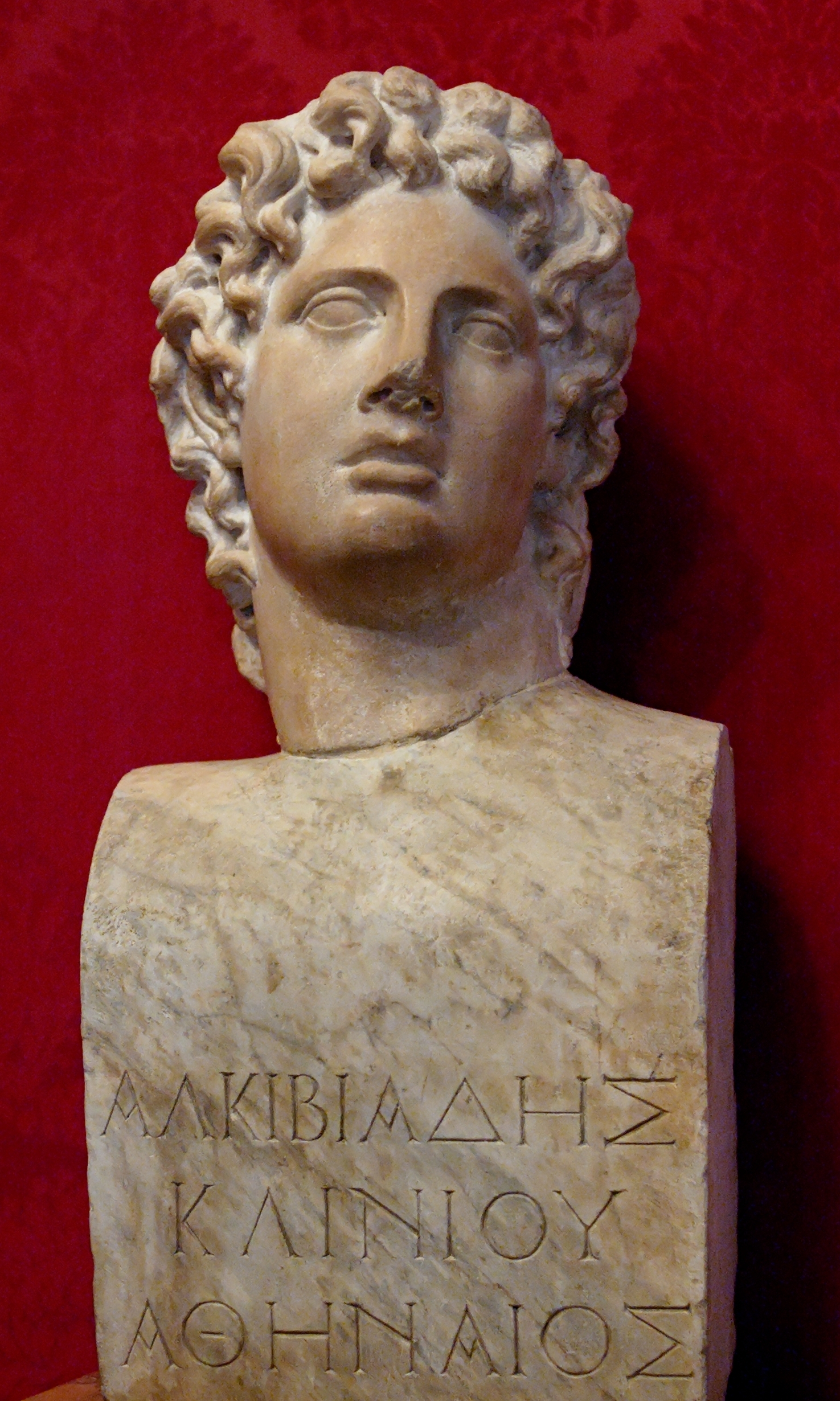
Bust of Alcibiades

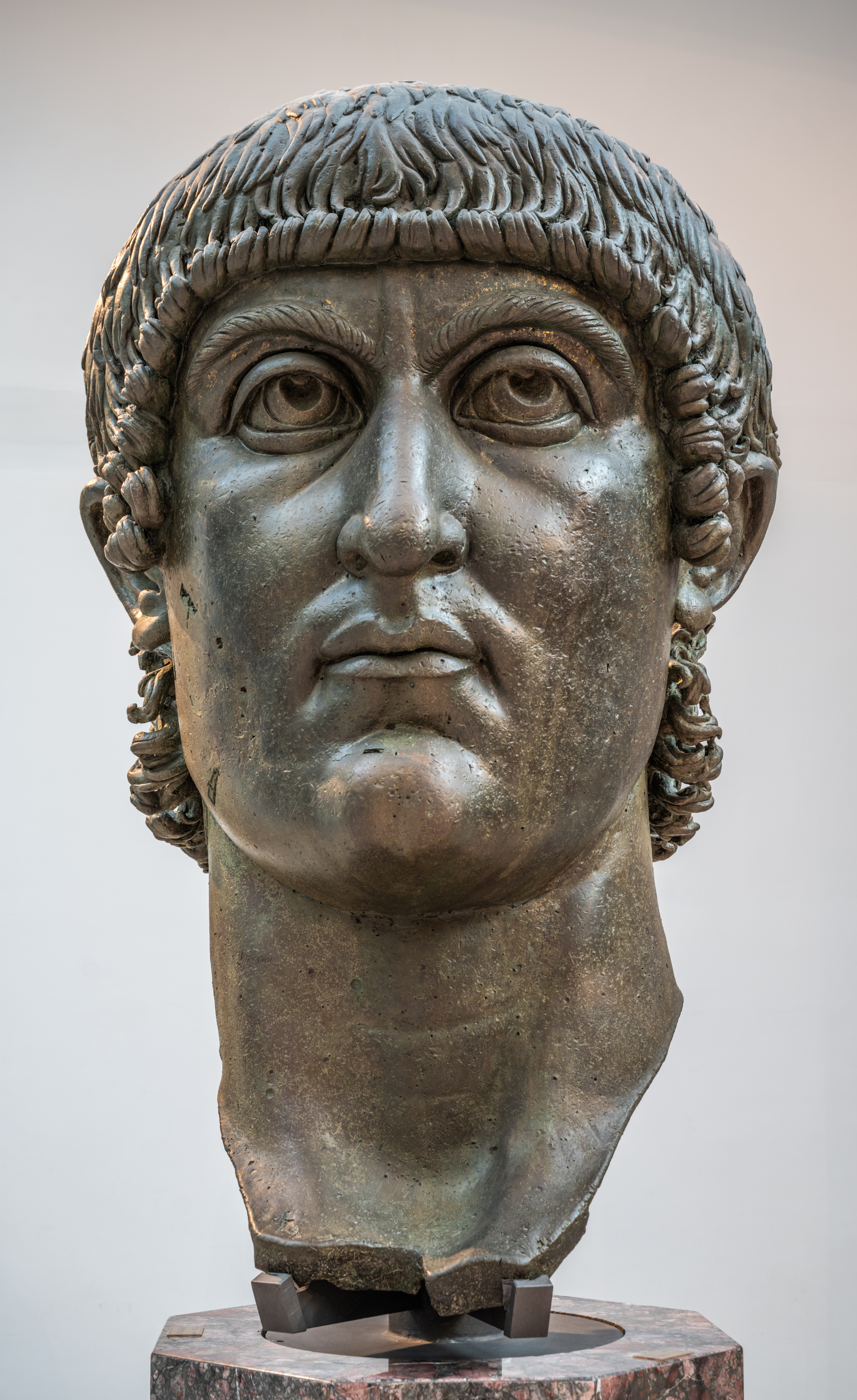
Head of the bronze colossus of Constantine

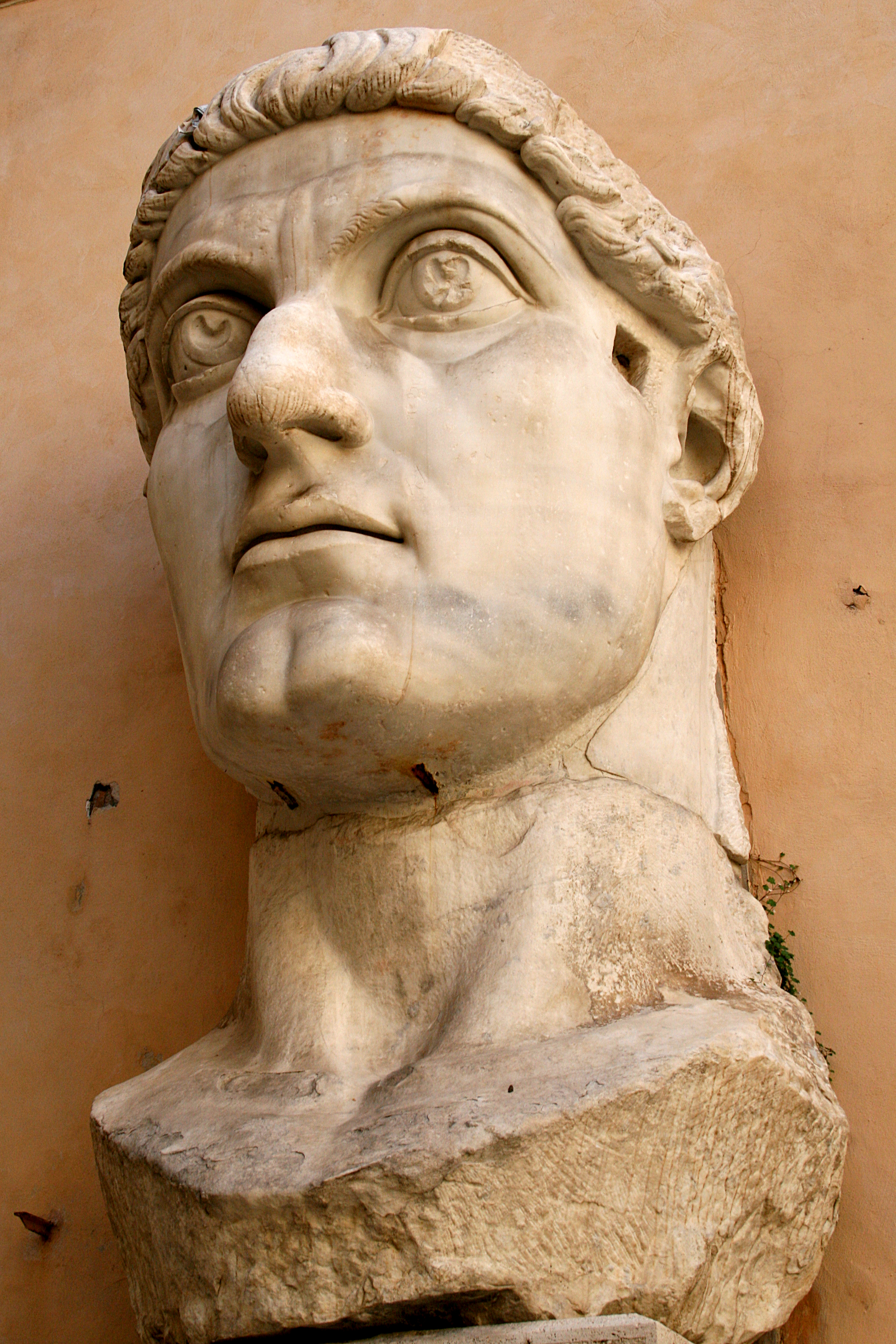
Head of the marble colossus of Constantine from the Basilica of Maxentius

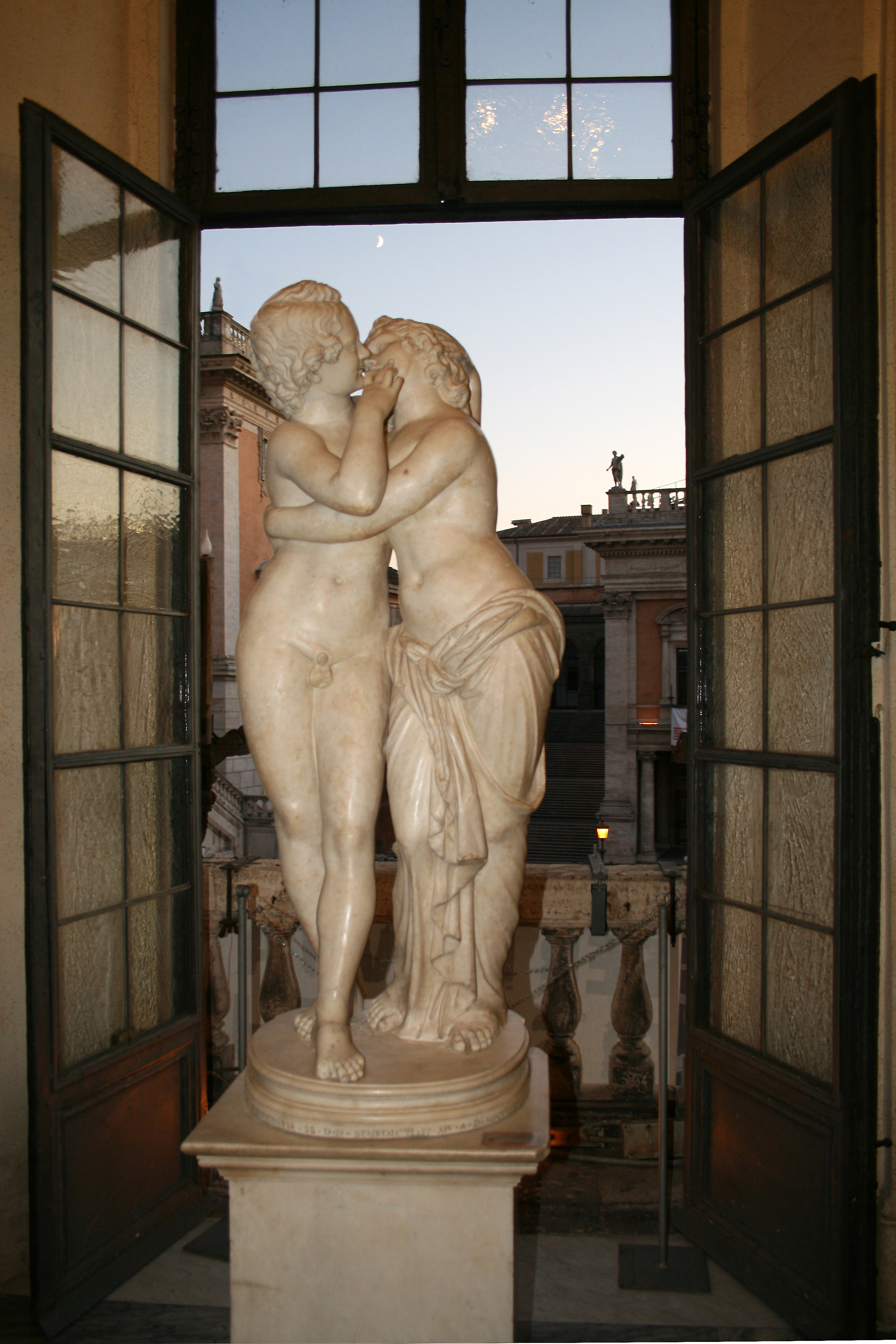
Cupid and Psyche, 300–201 BC, height: 1.254 m

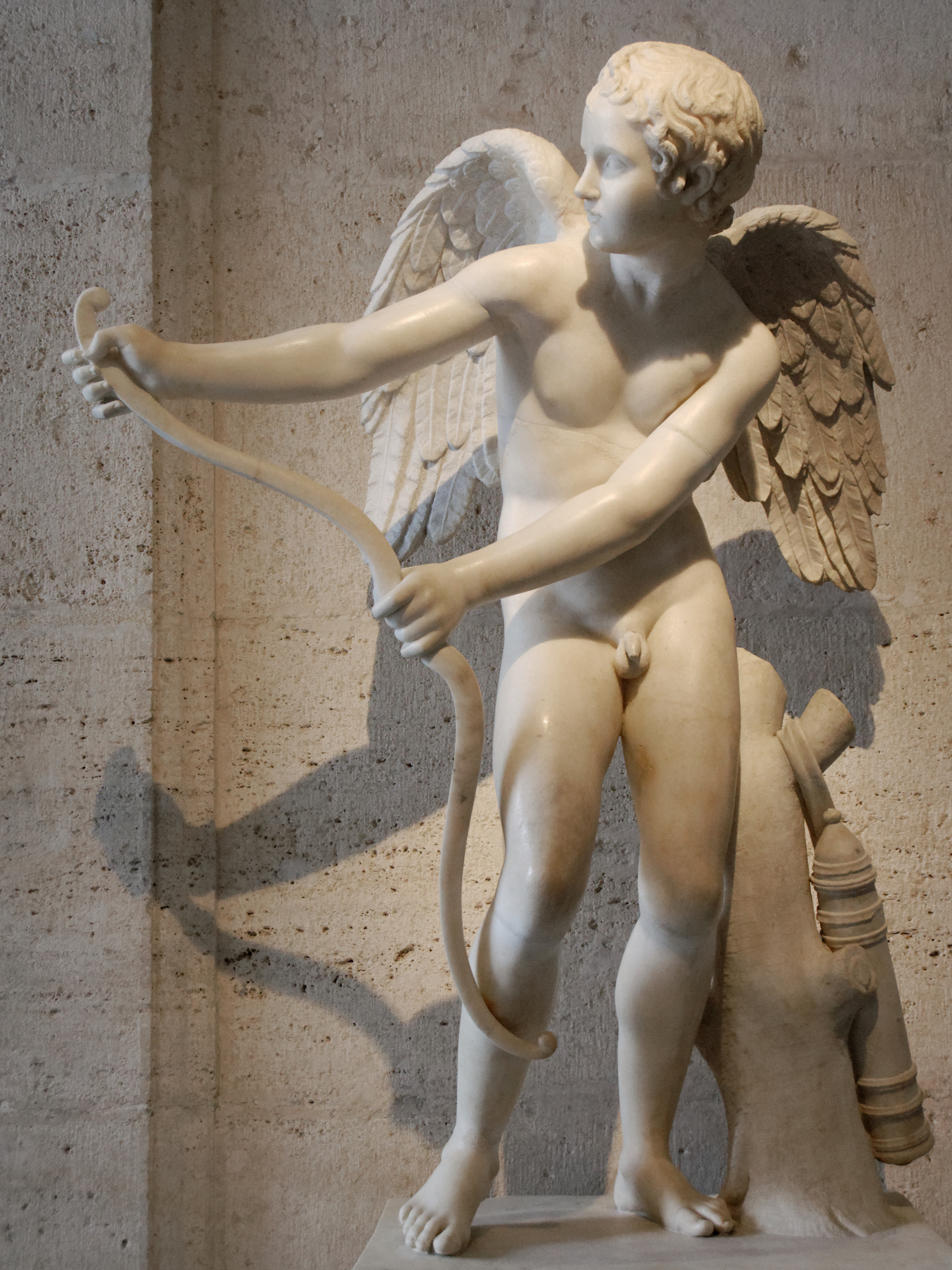
Eros Capitolini

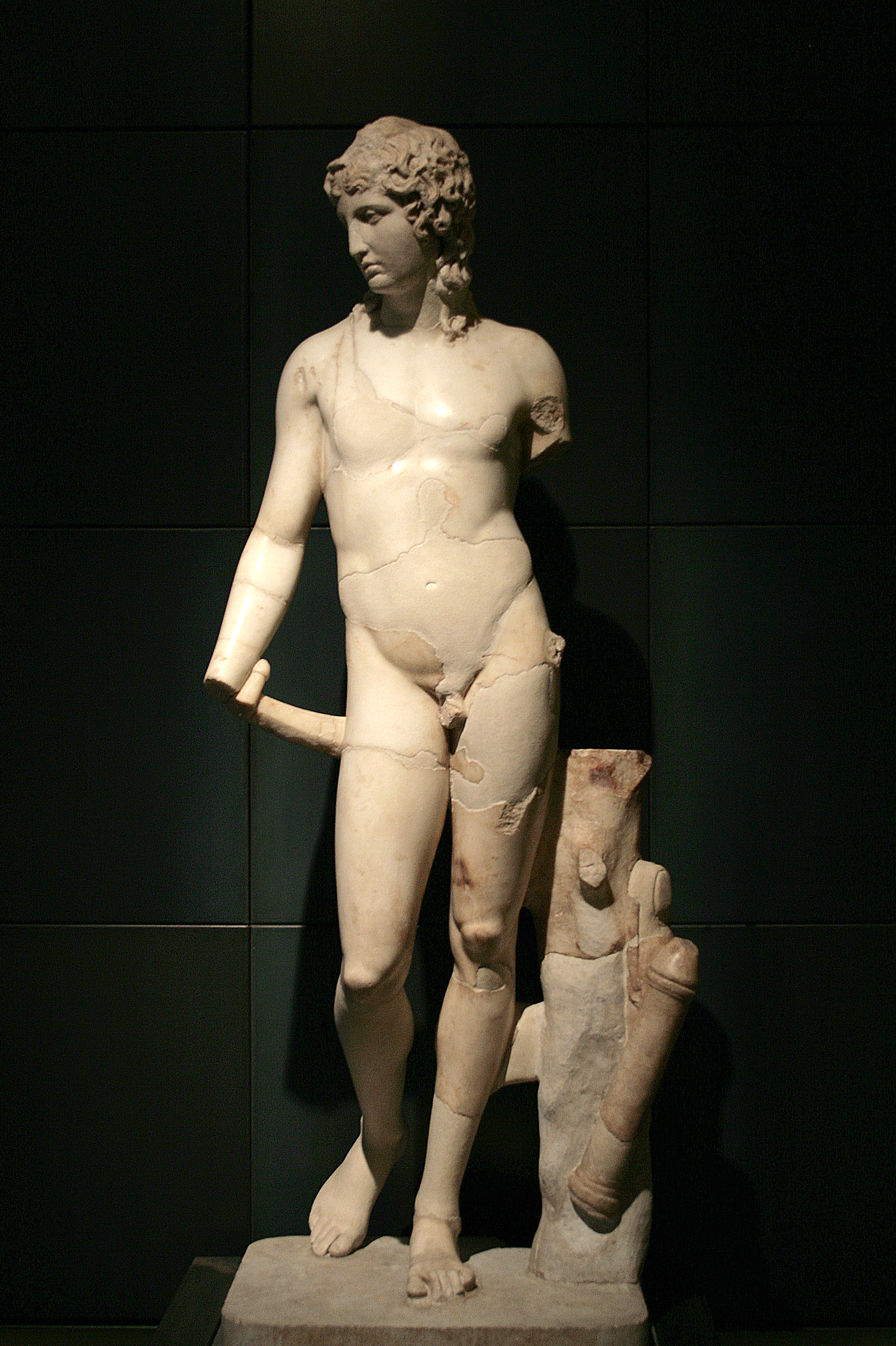
Eros Thanatos

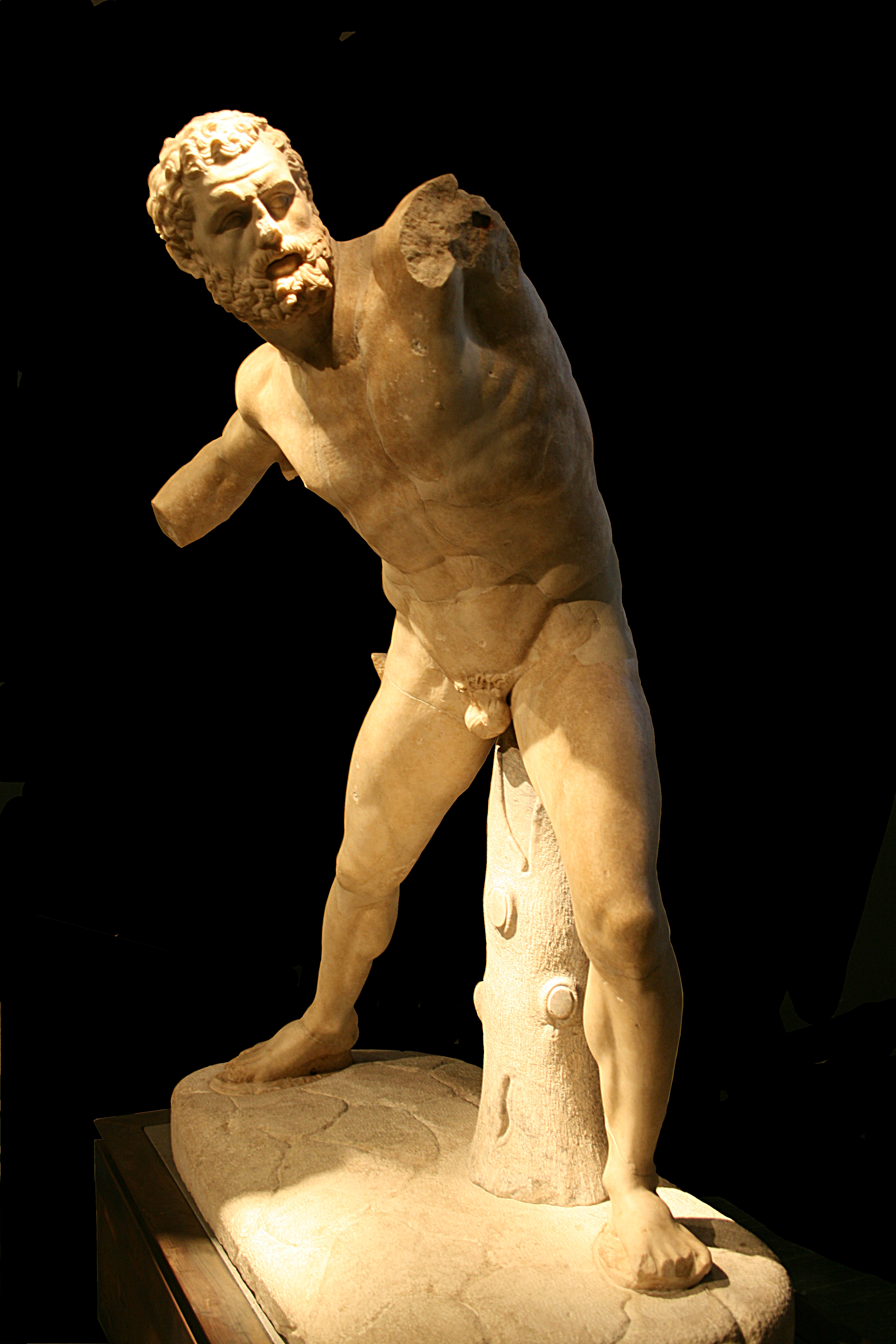
Heracles fighting

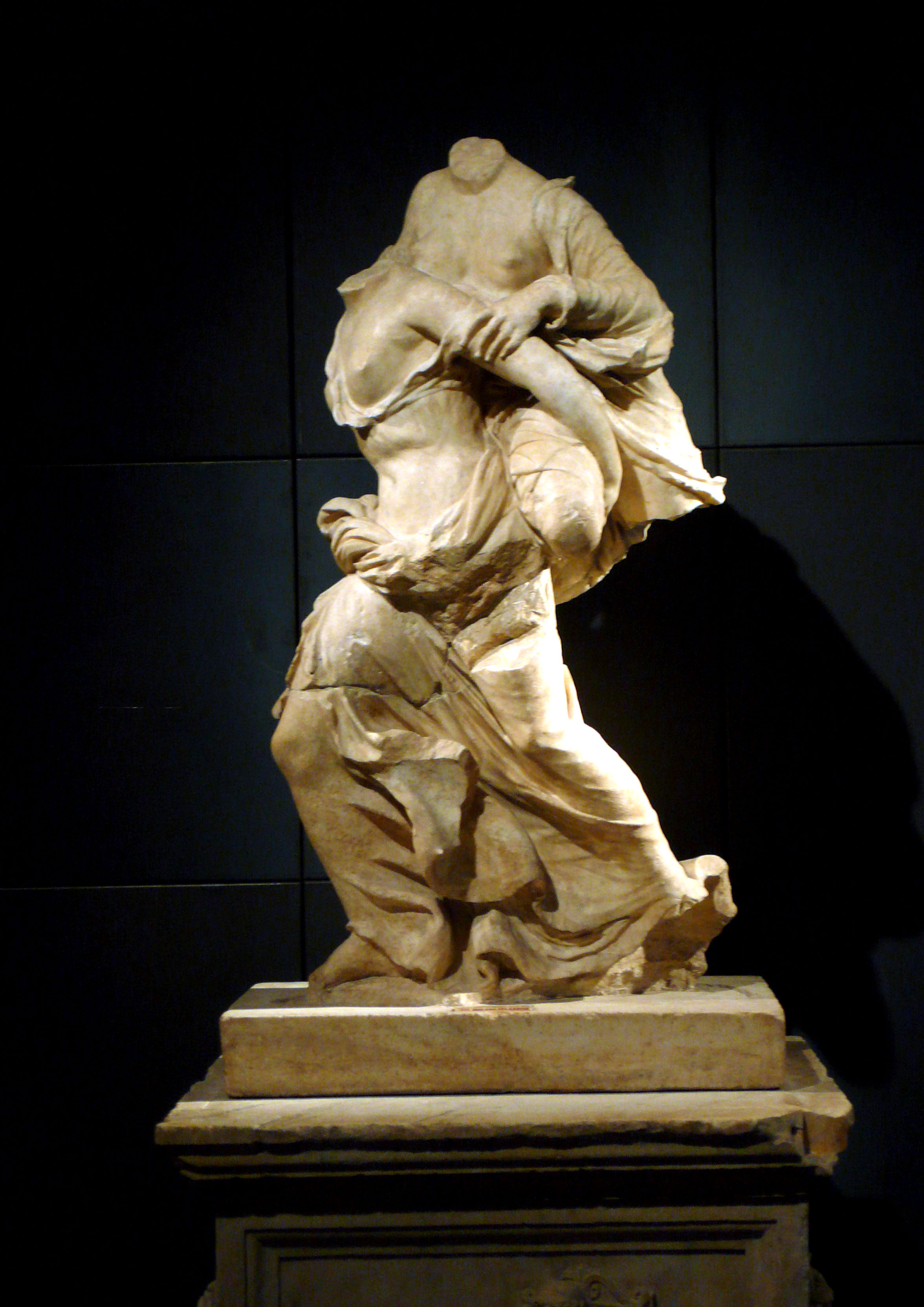
Ephedrismos (Ancient Greek original), from Horti Lamiani

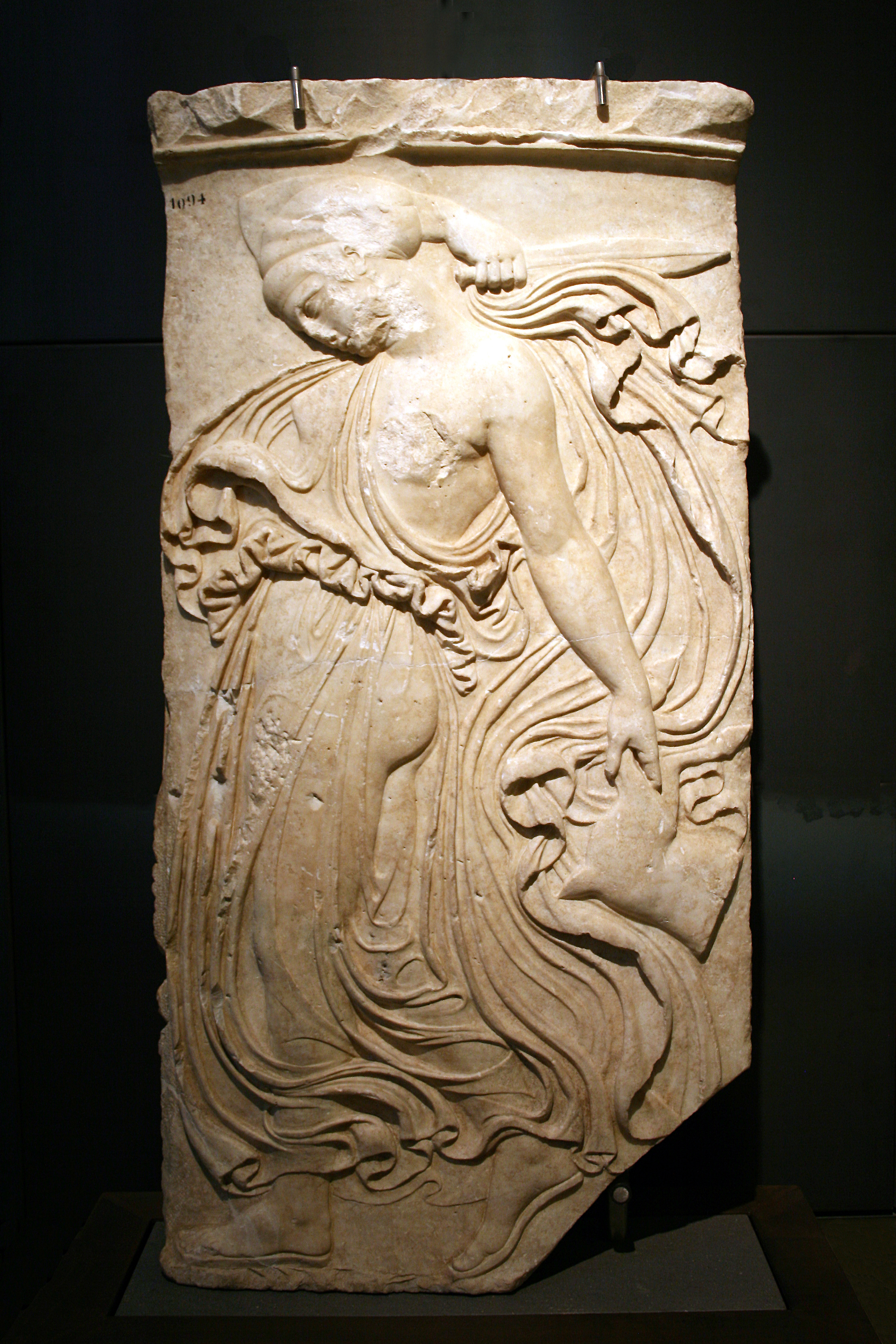
Dancing Maenad

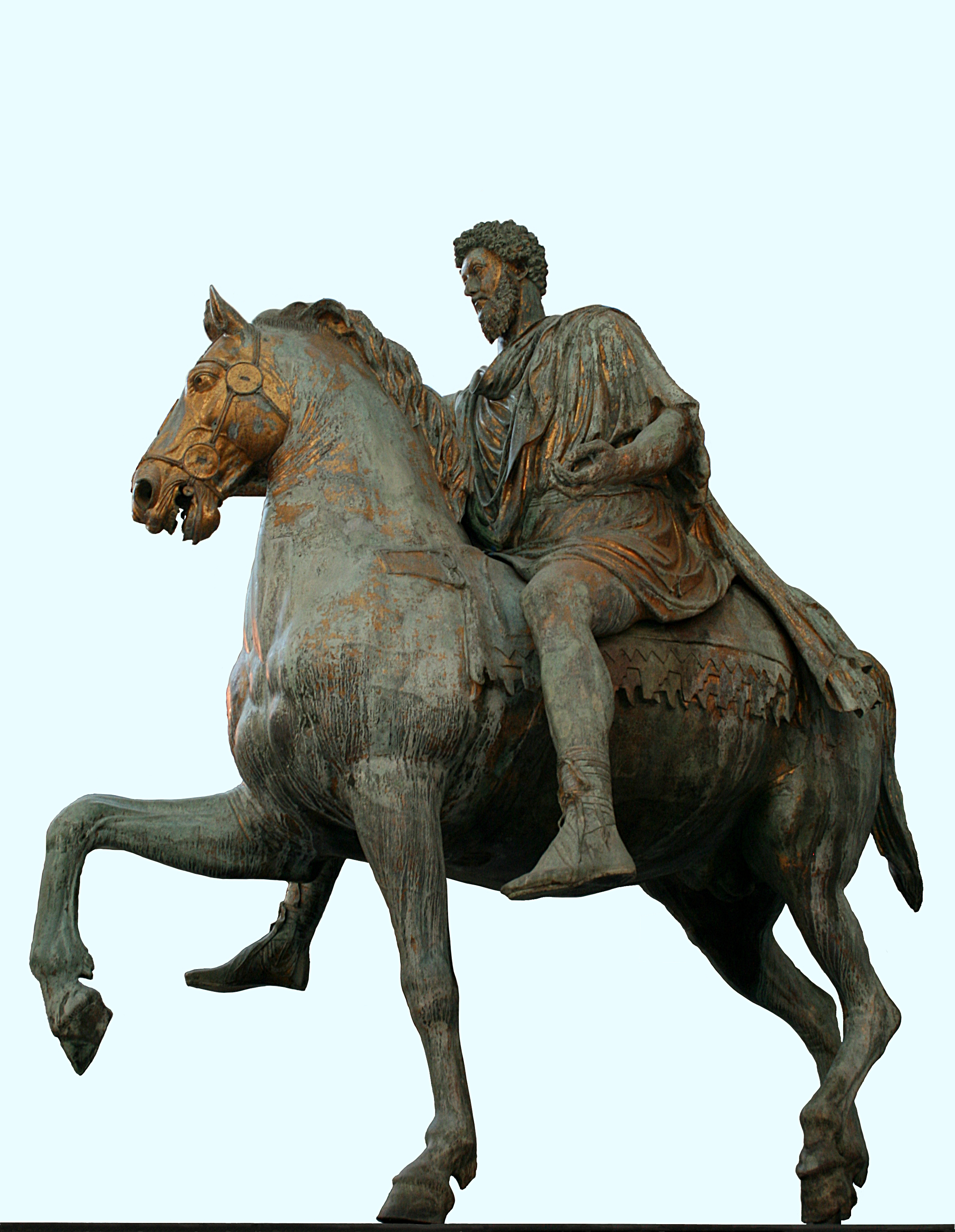
Equestrian statue of Marcus Aurelius

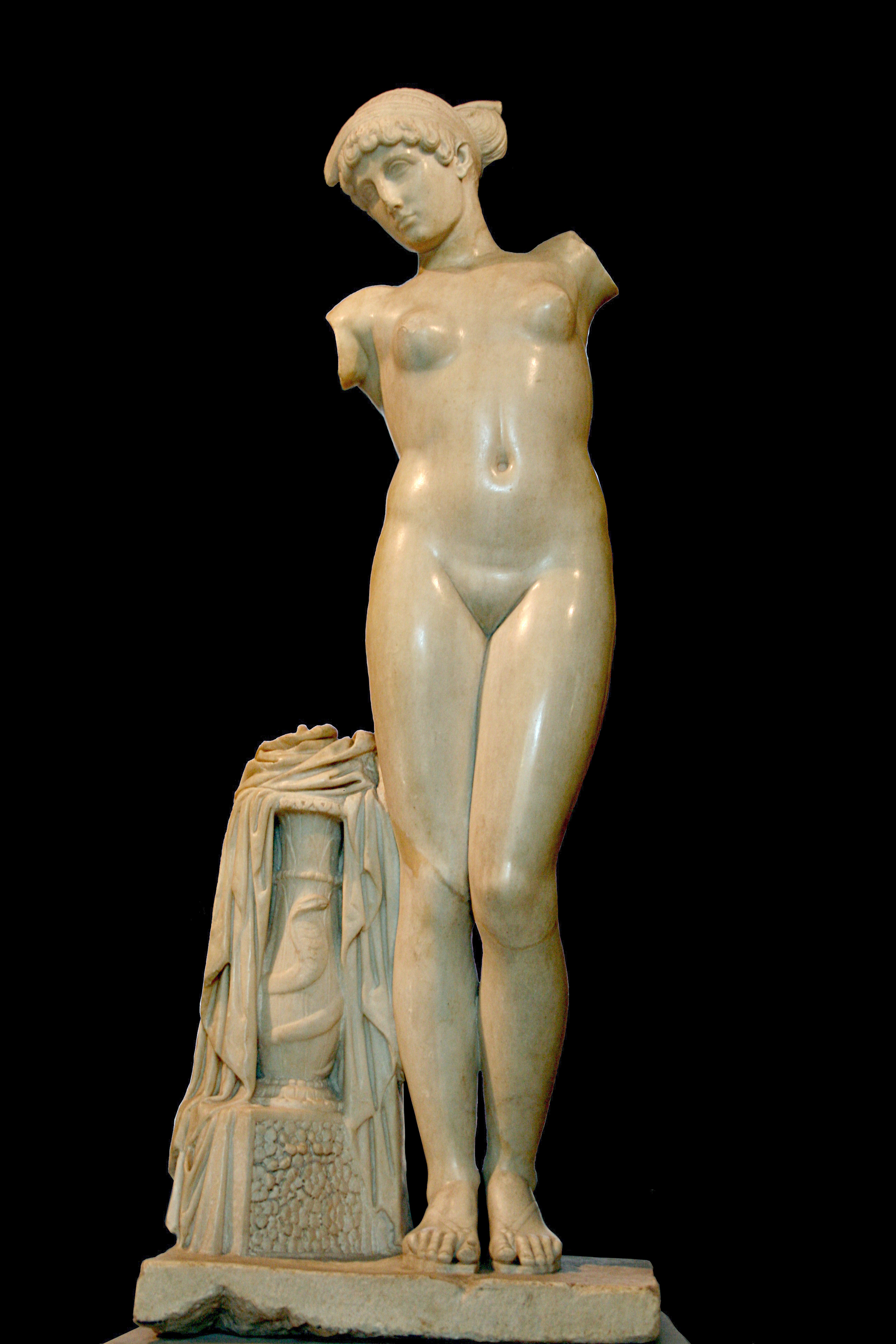
The Esquiline Venus 50 AD

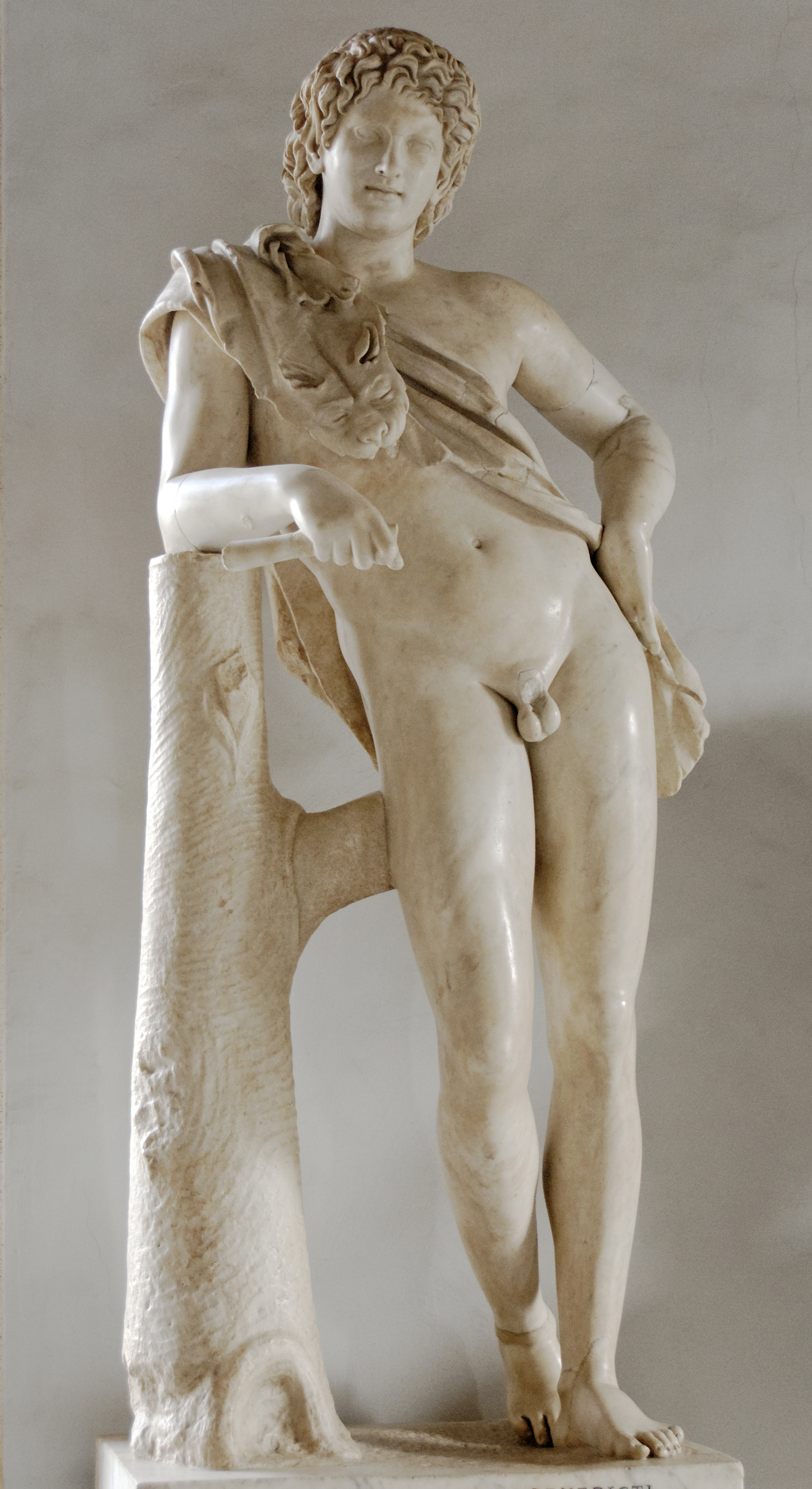
Resting Satyr statue

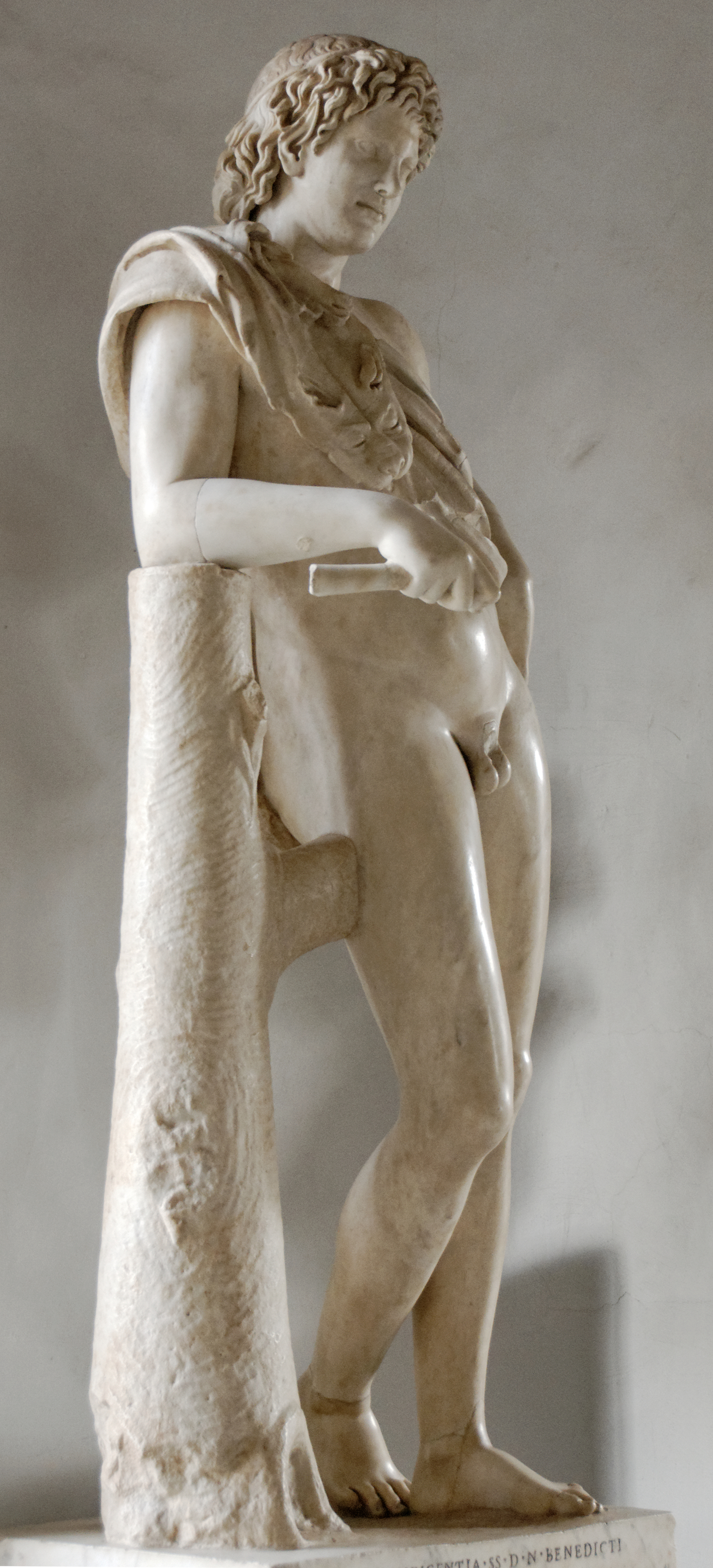
Leaning Satyr

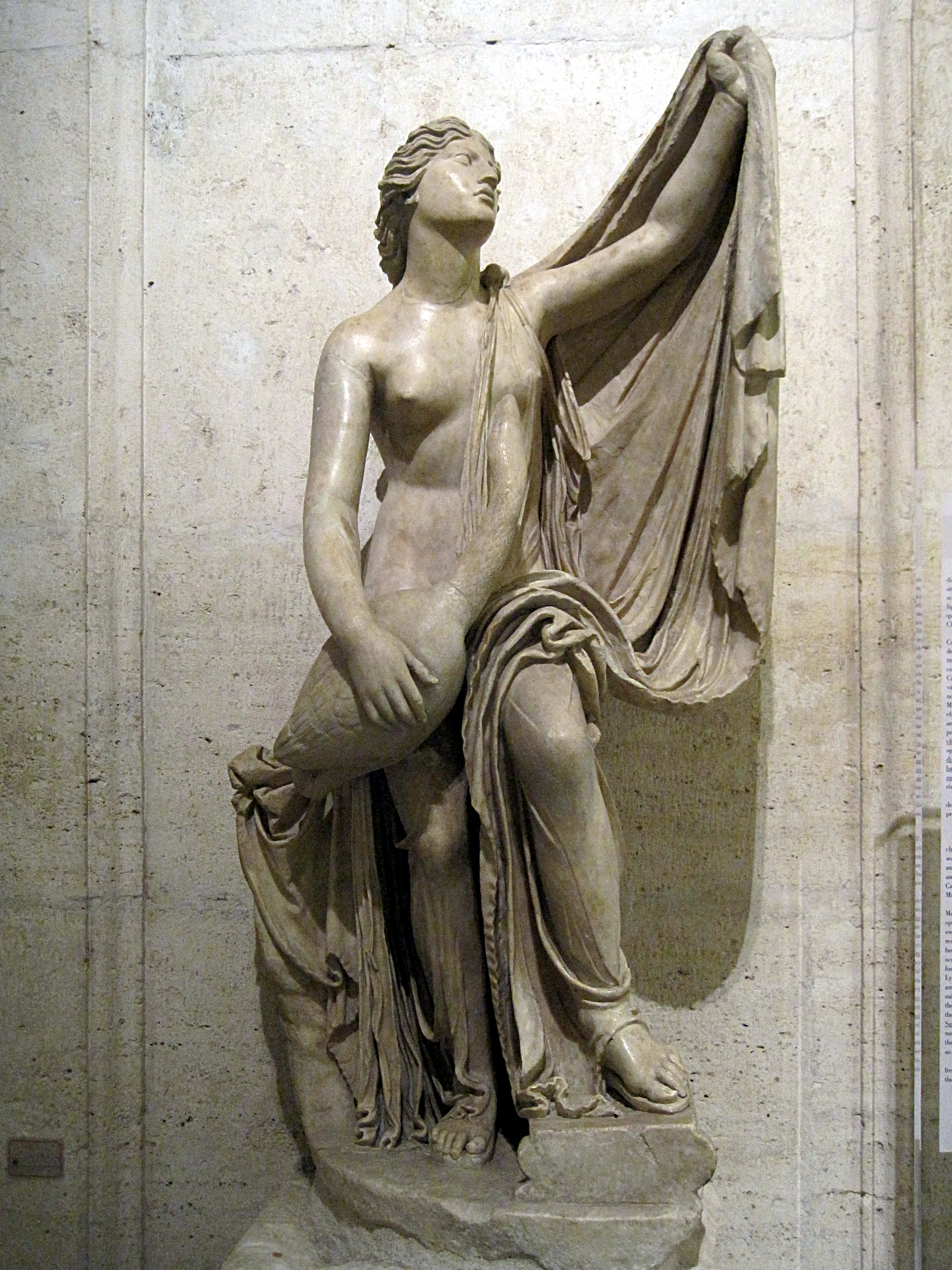
Statue of Leda and the Swan, 360 BC

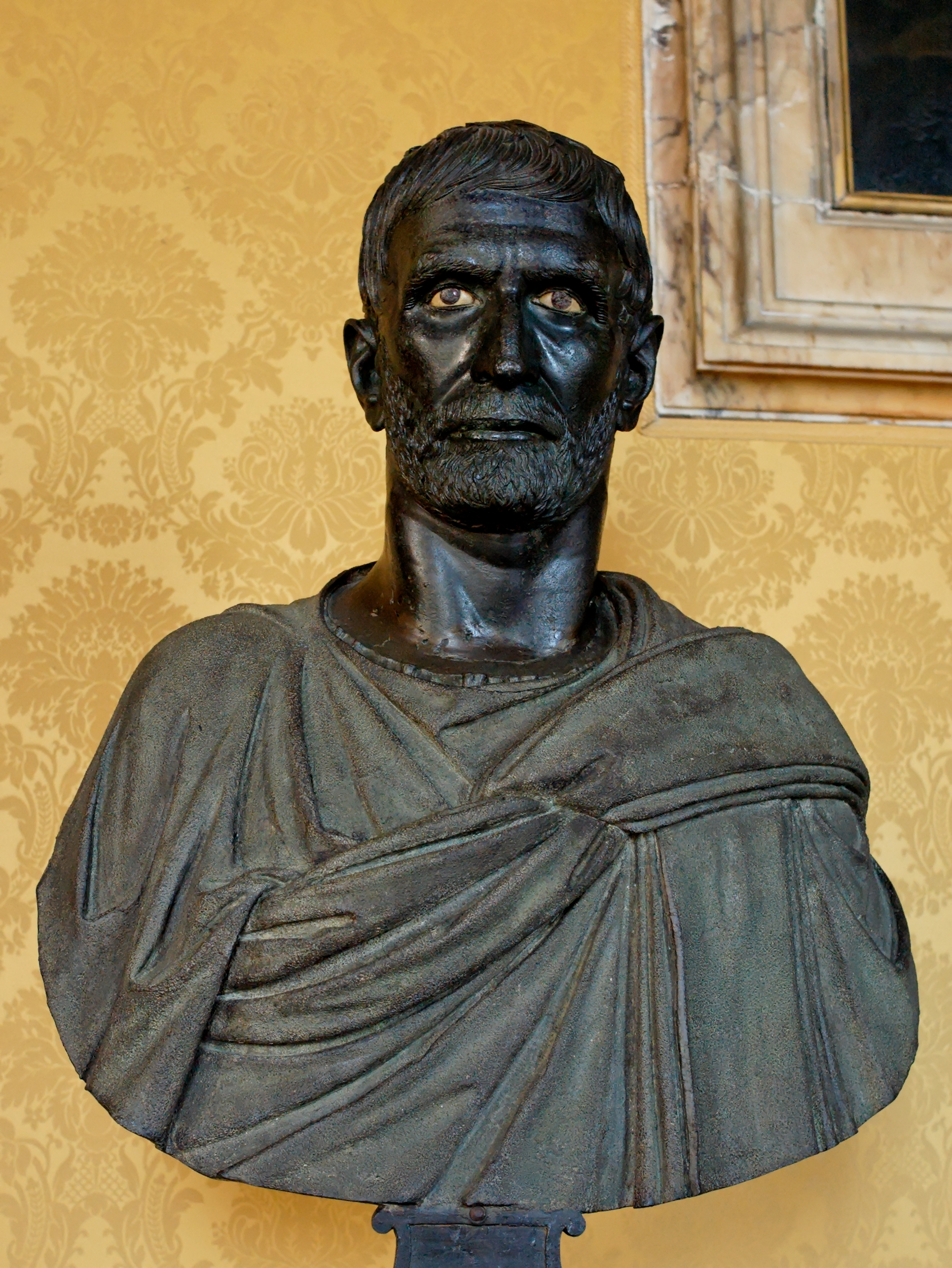
The Capitoline Brutus, 300–275 BC, height: 69 cm

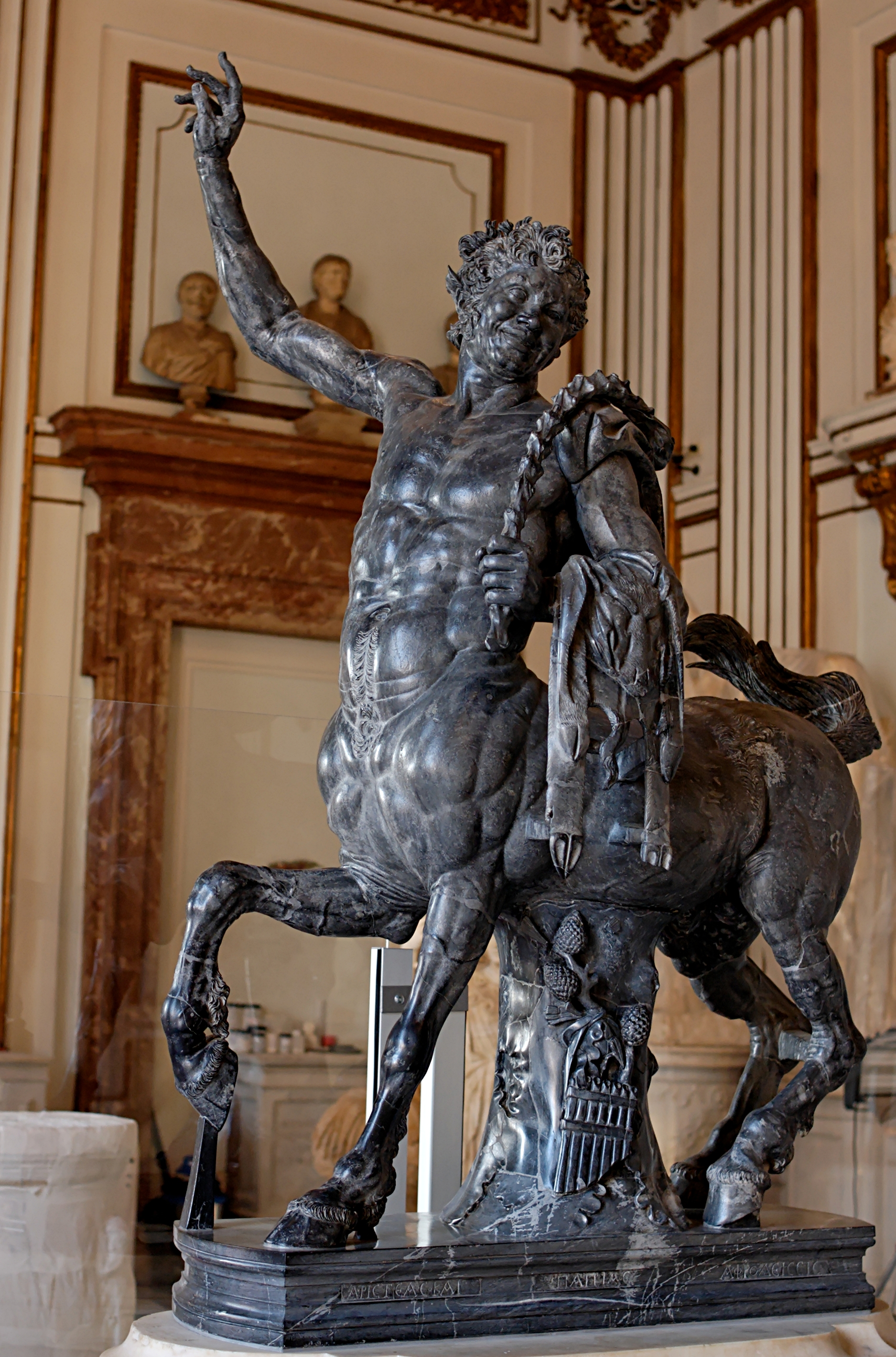
Young Centaur, Furietti Centaurs

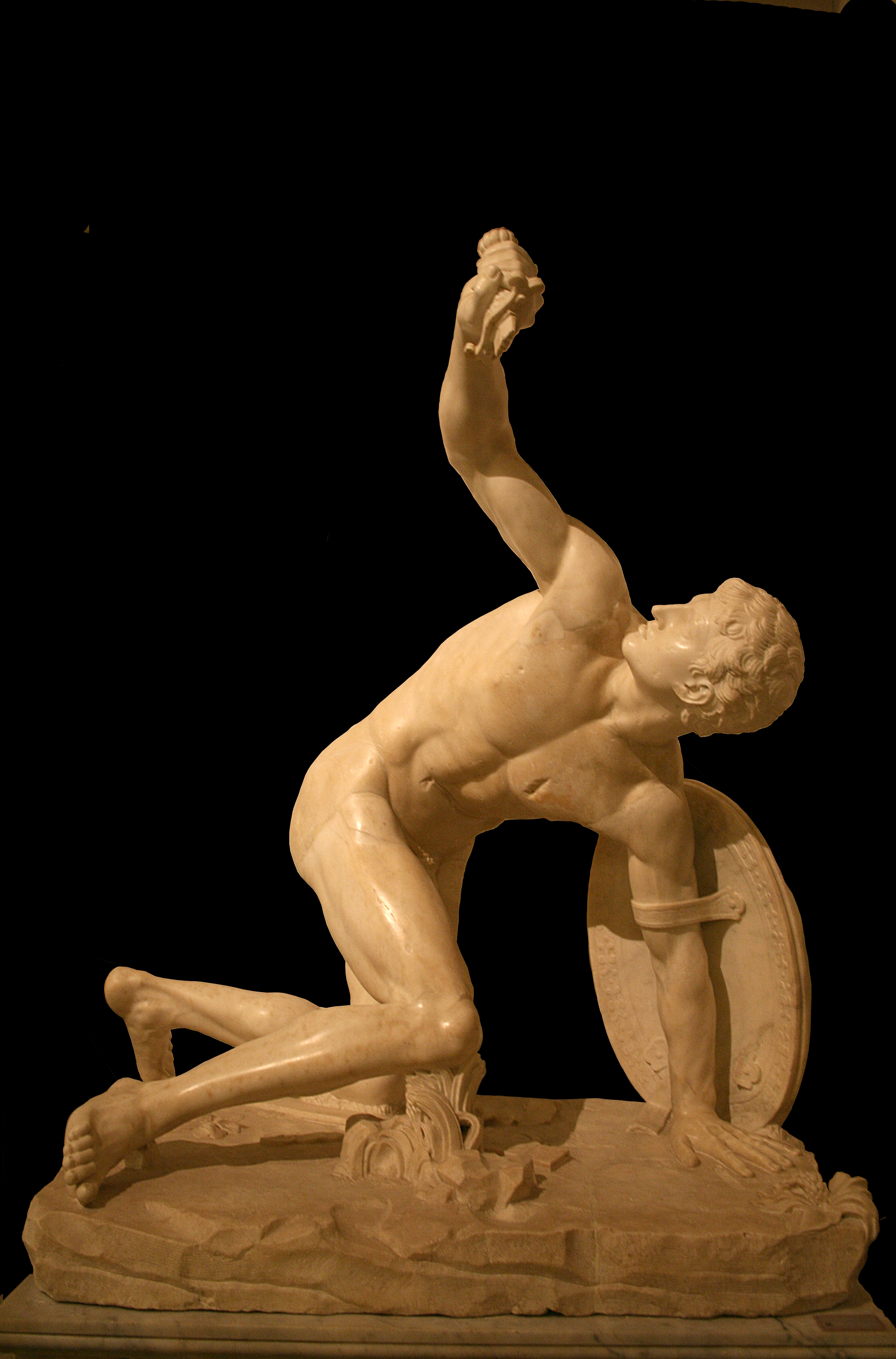
Torso of Discobolus restored as Wounded Warrior. 1st century AD. - ancient part: copy of torso of discobolo by Myron (460 BC). Modern restoration by Pierre-Étienne Monnot.

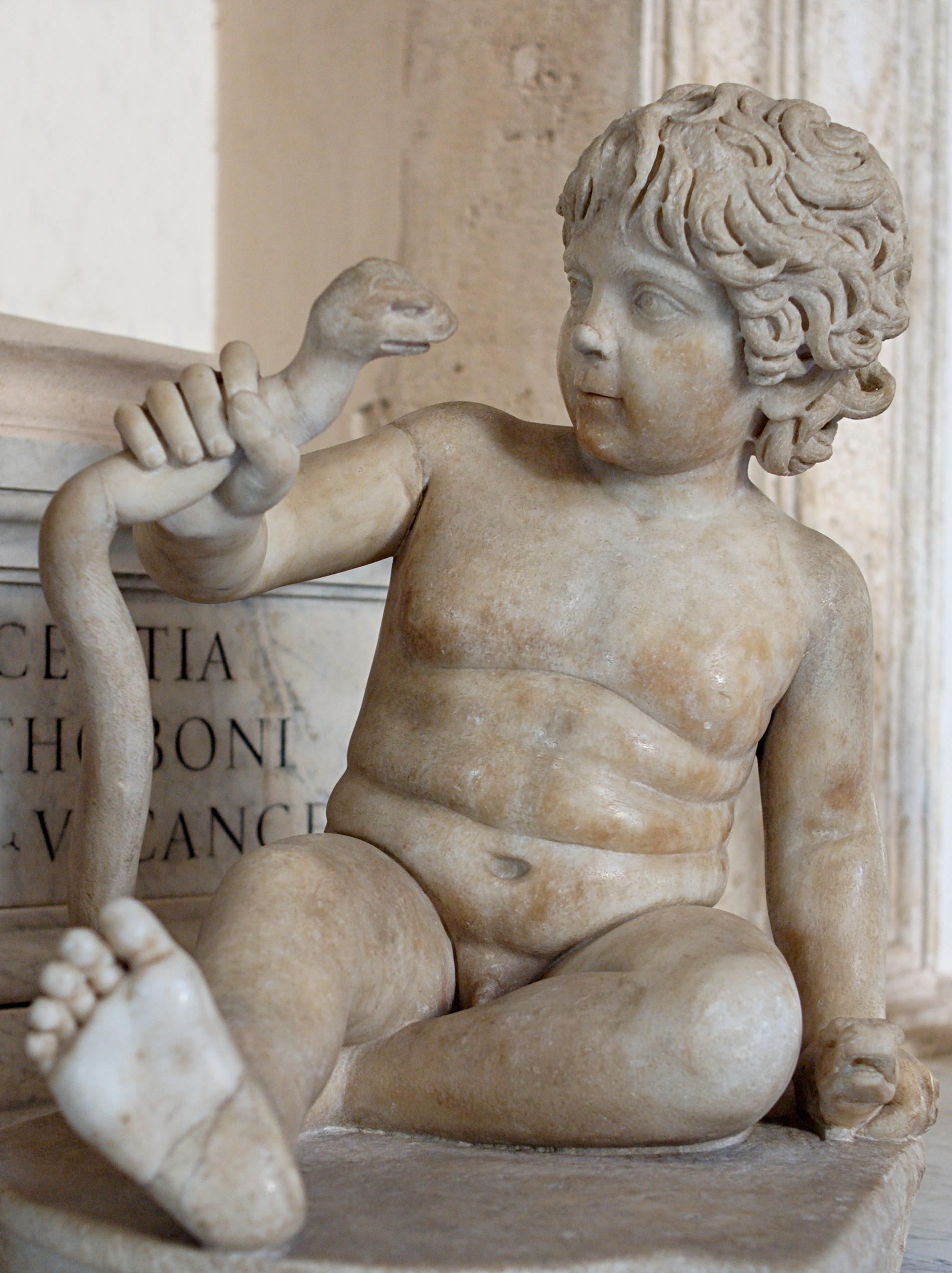
Baby Heracles strangling a snake sent to kill him in his cradle (Roman marble, 2nd century AD)

== See also ==
- List of museums in Rome
- Tourism in Rome
- List of tourist attractions in Rome
- List of largest art museums

Preceded by Boncompagni Ludovisi Decorative Art Museum	Landmarks of Rome; Capitoline Museums	Succeeded by Casa di Goethe
