= Horti Caesaris =

Two parks belonging to Julius Caesar in Rome

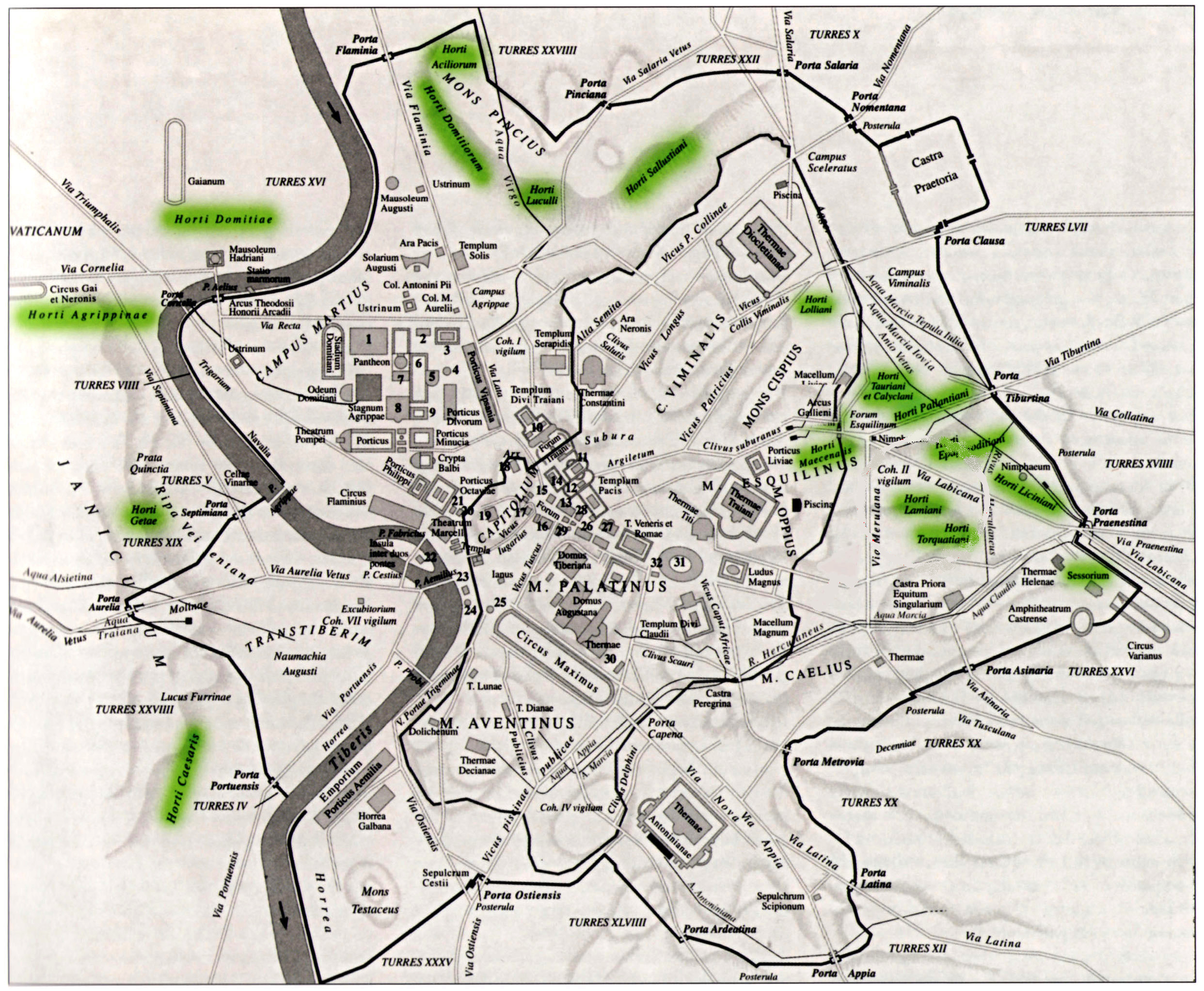
Horti of ancient Rome

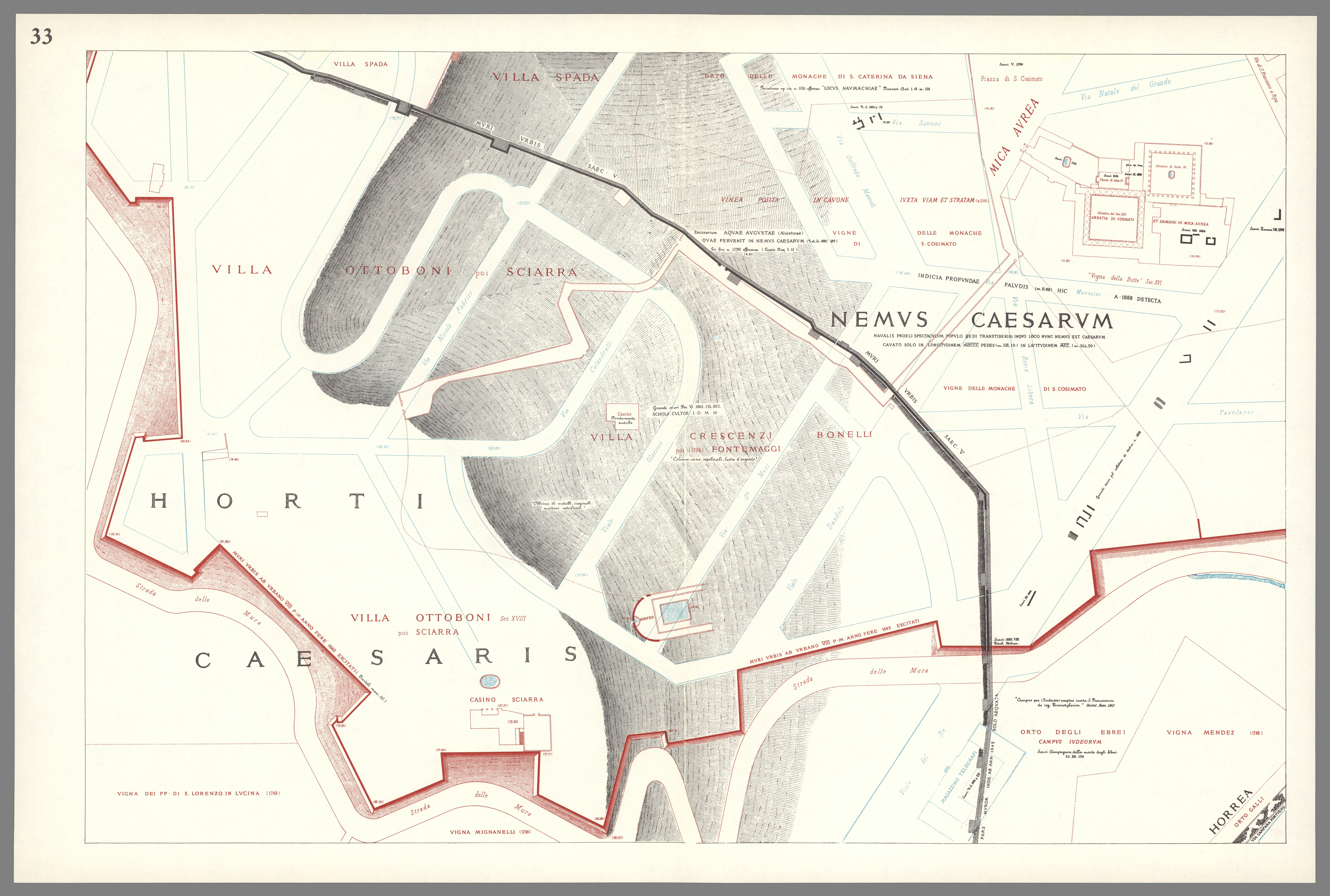
Plan of Quirinal from Forma Urbis Romae (Lanciani)

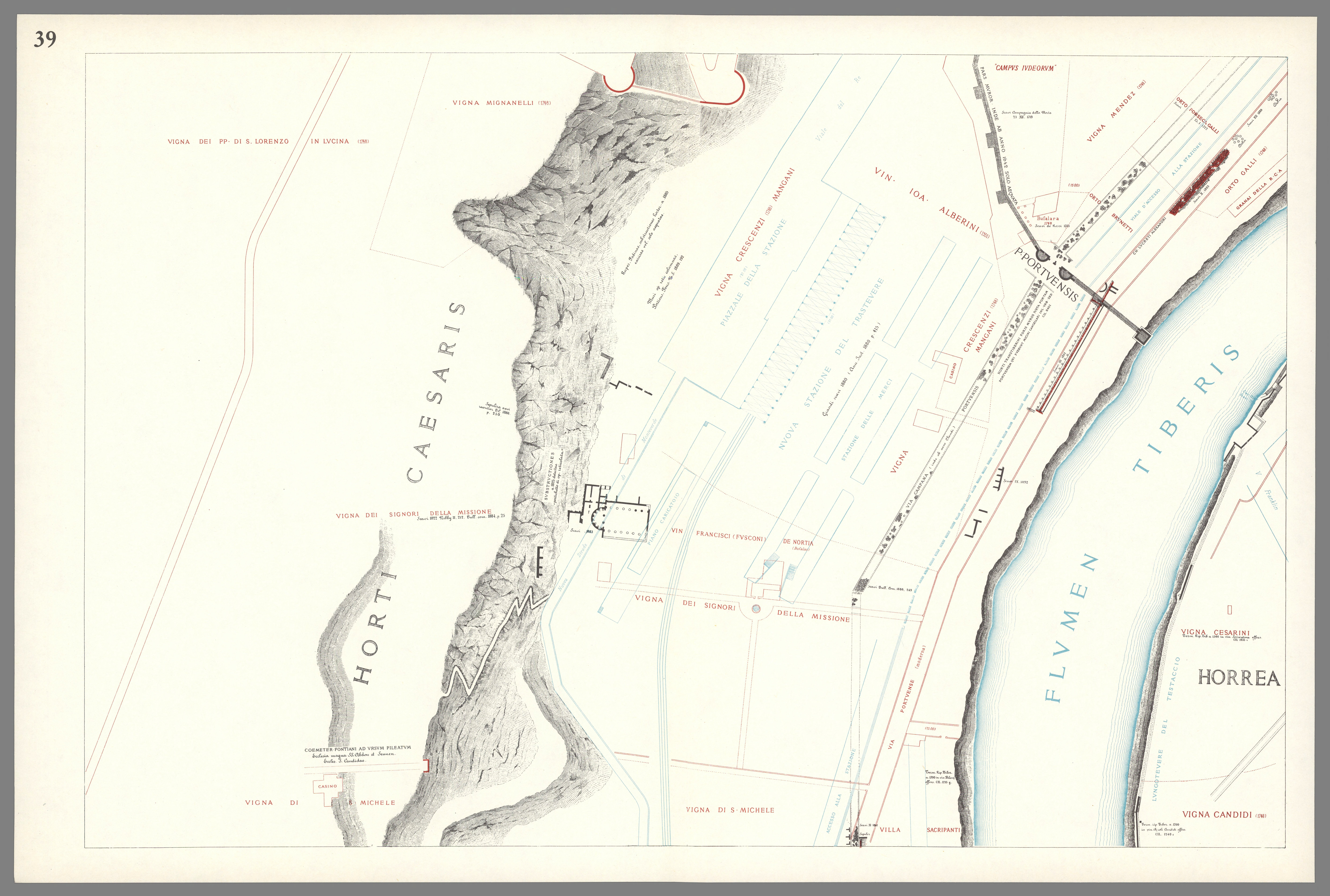
Plan of Tiber from Forma Urbis Romae (Lanciani)

The Horti Caesaris (Gardens of Caesar) was the name of two parks belonging to Julius Caesar in Rome.

== Quirinal ==
These were located at Porta Collina on the Quirinal. As the Servian Wall had lost its defensive function by this time and had been largely demolished, it is unclear whether or not this park was outside the city limits. After Caesar's death these gardens were owned by his friend Sallust, who added them to his own lands and built the Horti Sallustiani.

== Tiber ==
The gardens on the Tiber lay outside the city wall at the first milestone of the Via Portuensis. Cleopatra stayed in them during her 44 BC visit to Rome, since no foreign head of state was allowed within the pomerium of Rome. After his death, Caesar left these gardens to the people of Rome.

== See also ==
- Roman gardens

== Bibliography ==
- L. Richardson, jr, A New Topographical Dictionary of Ancient Rome, Baltimore - London 1992. pp. 197
