= Orestes and Electra =

Characters from Greek mythology

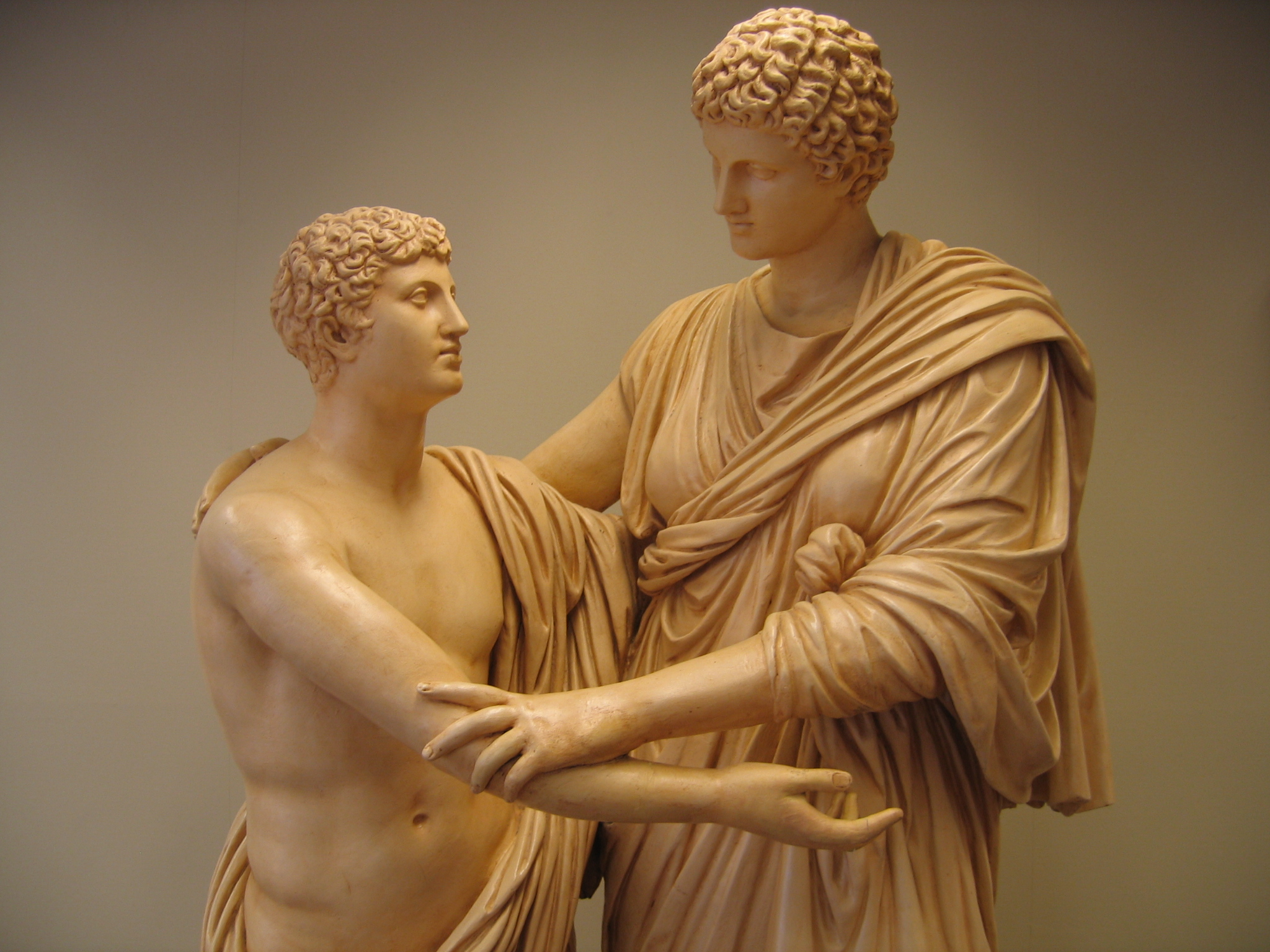

Orestes and Electra has been the subject and title of several works of art, including two different sculptural groups in the collections of the Naples National Archaeological Museum.

== Clothed ==
One is a 2.1m high Hellenistic sculpture, once thought to depict Orestes and Electra. It shows a heavily draped adult female on the right, looking down on and apparently beckoning a partially nude younger male or child, who looks up at her.

A marble copy was produced between 1685 and 1688 for the Palace of Versailles, copied from a cast of the original entrusted to Benoît Massou then Martin Carlier and to Michel Monier. It was initially interpreted as Peace between the Greeks and the Roman but was later interpreted as relating the episode in which the young Papirius, known as Praetextatus, having been permitted to attend a sitting of the Roman Senate with his father, thwarts his mother's curiosity by humorously telling her that the Senate had been debating whether it were better for the State that a man have two wives or a woman have two husbands. It was placed in the Ballroom Grove in 1738, moved to the Tuileries Garden during the French Revolution and in the 19th century replaced Poetus and Arria on the Green Carpet in the Main Perspective.

== Nude male ==
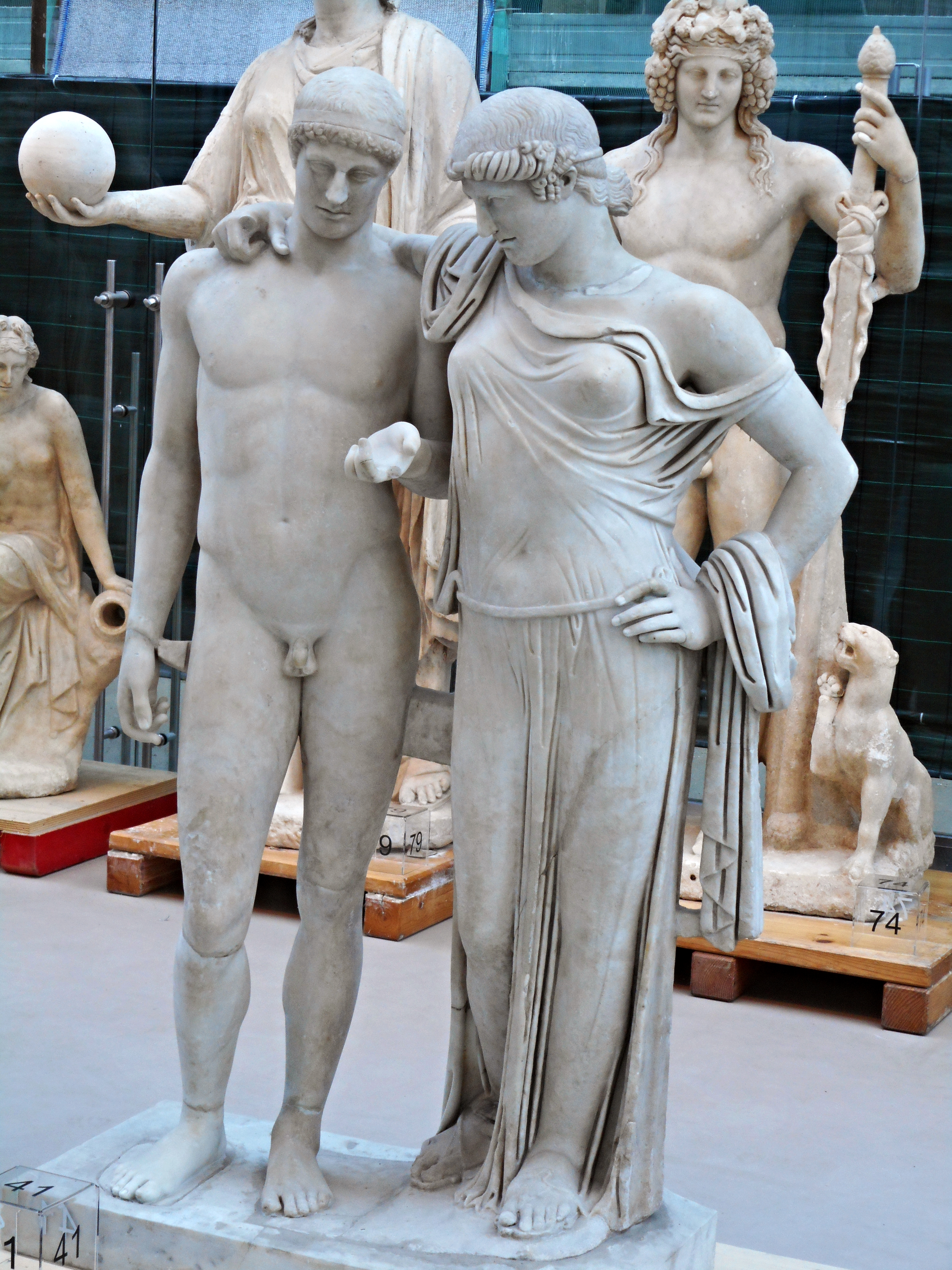
Orestes and Electra

The other depicts a young nude male and a young clothed female, of the same age and height, leaning on each other. This is now thought to be Orestes and Electra.
