= Esquiline Venus =

Ancient Roman marble sculpture of a nude female in sandals and a diadem

The Esquiline Venus
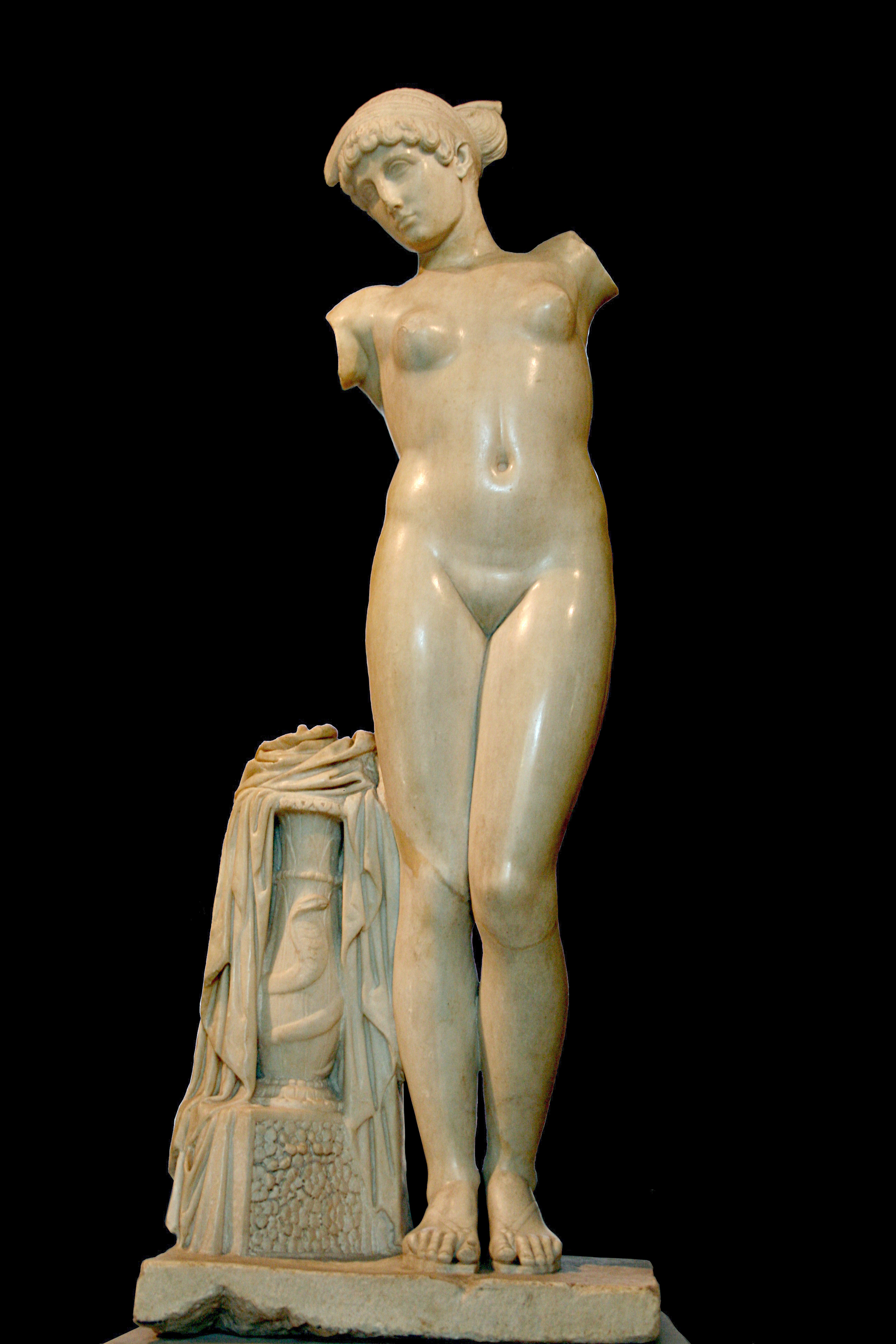
- Artist: Unknown
- Year: c. 50 AD
- Type: White marble
- Location: Capitoline Museums, Rome

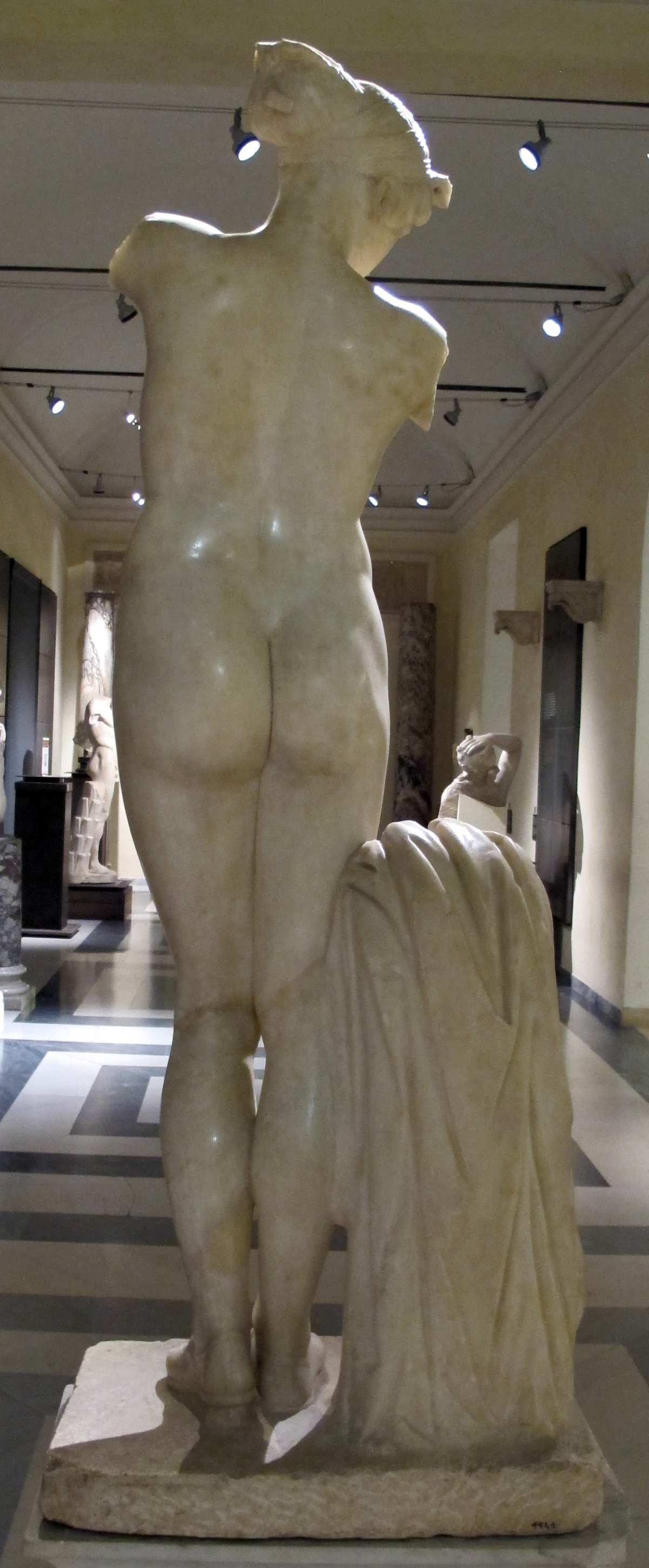

The Esquiline Venus is a smaller-than-life-size Roman nude marble sculpture of a female in sandals and a diadem headdress. There is no definitive scholarly consensus on either its provenience or its subject. It is widely viewed as a 1st-century CE Roman copy (i.e. an interpretatio graeca) of a Hellenistic original from the 1st-century BCE Ptolemaic Kingdom, commissioned by Emperor Claudius to decorate the Horti Lamiani.

The figure may depict the Ptolemaic ruler Cleopatra VII; it may also have been intended to represent the Roman-Egyptian syncretic deity Venus-Isis.

A vase next to the nude figure includes an asp or uraeus and depictions of the Egyptian cobra, symbols which support the Cleopatra interpretation.

== History ==
The Esquiline Venus was found in 1874 in Piazza Dante on the Esquiline Hill in Rome, probably part of the site of the Horti Lamiani, one of the imperial gardens, rich archaeological sources of classical sculpture. In the 16th and 17th centuries, the thirteen Medici Niobids, a variant of the Laocoön and His Sons, the bust of Commodus with the attributes of Hercules, and the Discobolus had already been found here. After 1870 intensive building work was ongoing at the site, as part of preparations to make Rome the new capital of the Kingdom of Italy, following the Italian unification. The newly found sculpture soon passed into the collection of the Capitoline Museums, where it now resides, and is usually on display at its Museo Centrale Montemartini.

In style the Esquiline Venus is an example of the Pasitelean "eclectic" Neo-Attic school, combining elements from a variety of other previous schools – a Praxitelean idea of the nude female form; a face, muscular torso, and small high breasts in the fifth-century BC severe style; and pressed-together thighs typical of Hellenistic sculptures. Its arms must have broken off when the statue fell after the imperial park in which it stood fell into neglect after antiquity. They have been frequently restored in paintings (see below), but never in reality.

== Subject ==
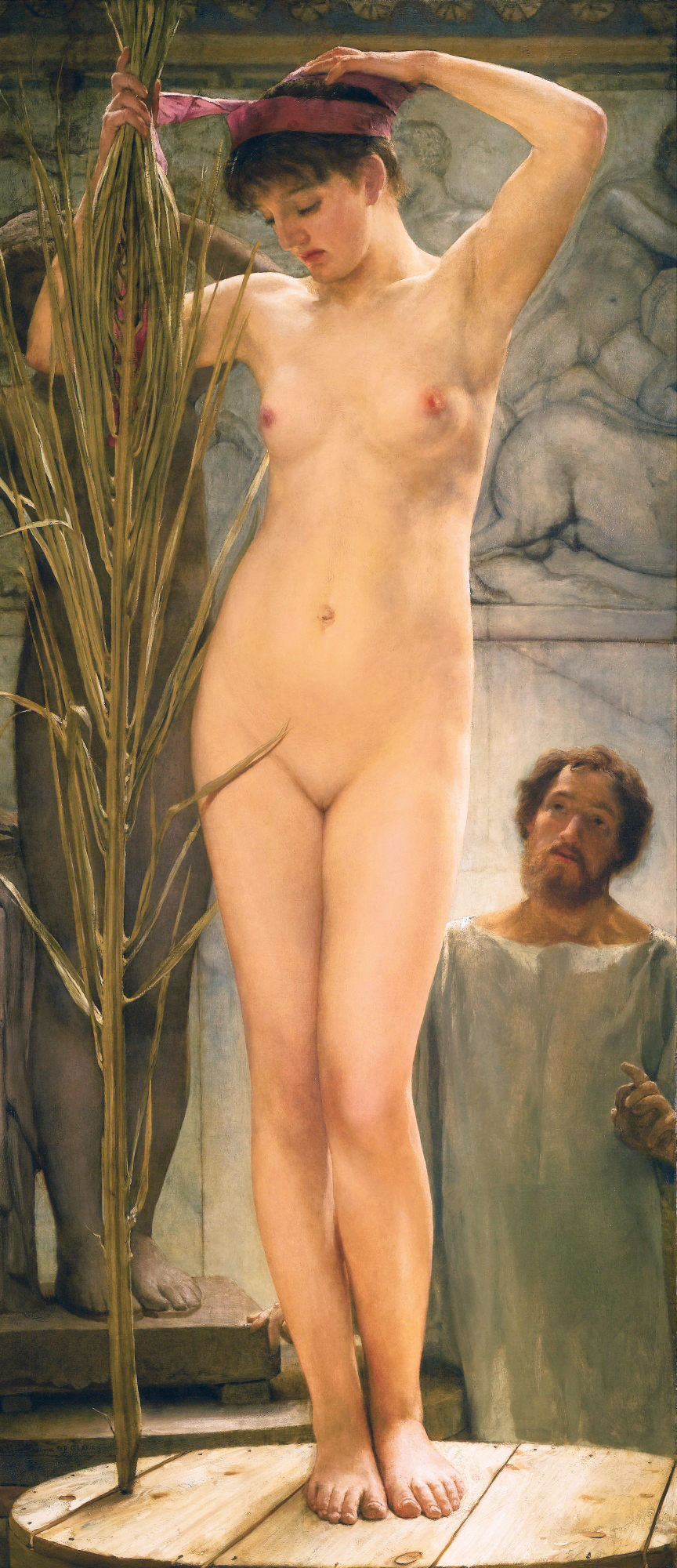
A Sculptor's Model, by Lawrence Alma-Tadema, 1877

The statue's subject has variously been interpreted, as the Roman goddess Venus (possibly in the form Venus Anadyomene), as a nude mortal female bather, a female version of the diadumenos tying up the hair with a fillet (see below). The Esquiline Venus is generally thought to be a mid-1st-century AD Roman copy of a 1st-century BC Greek original from the school of Pasiteles. Its provenance has been characterized both as a Ptolemaic-Egyptian commission or as a copy of one, perhaps a copy commissioned by Claudius himself for the imperial gardens. This identification is based on the statue's Egyptian-style robe, descending over a vase, the asp or uraeus Egyptian cobra on the vase, and curly hair; if correct, these features could make it a cult statue of the goddess Isis, or an image (perhaps that set up by Julius Caesar) of Cleopatra VII as Isis or Venus-Isis (the two were frequently conflated). This view is backed by the Italian philologist Licinio Glori in 1955. Or she could be a copy of the statue of Cleopatra set up by Caesar in the temple of Venus Genetrix, a view supported by Bernard Andreae. In addition to hairstyle and facial features, the apparent royal diadem worn over the head is also an indication that it depicts Cleopatra. Detractors of this theory argue that the facial features on the Berlin bust and coinage of Cleopatra differ and assert that it was unlikely she would be depicted as the naked goddess Venus (i.e. the Greek Aphrodite). However, she was depicted in an Egyptian statue as the goddess Isis. Cleopatra was also depicted on some of her coins as Venus-Aphrodite, and reportedly dressed as Aphrodite when meeting Mark Antony at Tarsos in 42 BC.

== In modern art ==
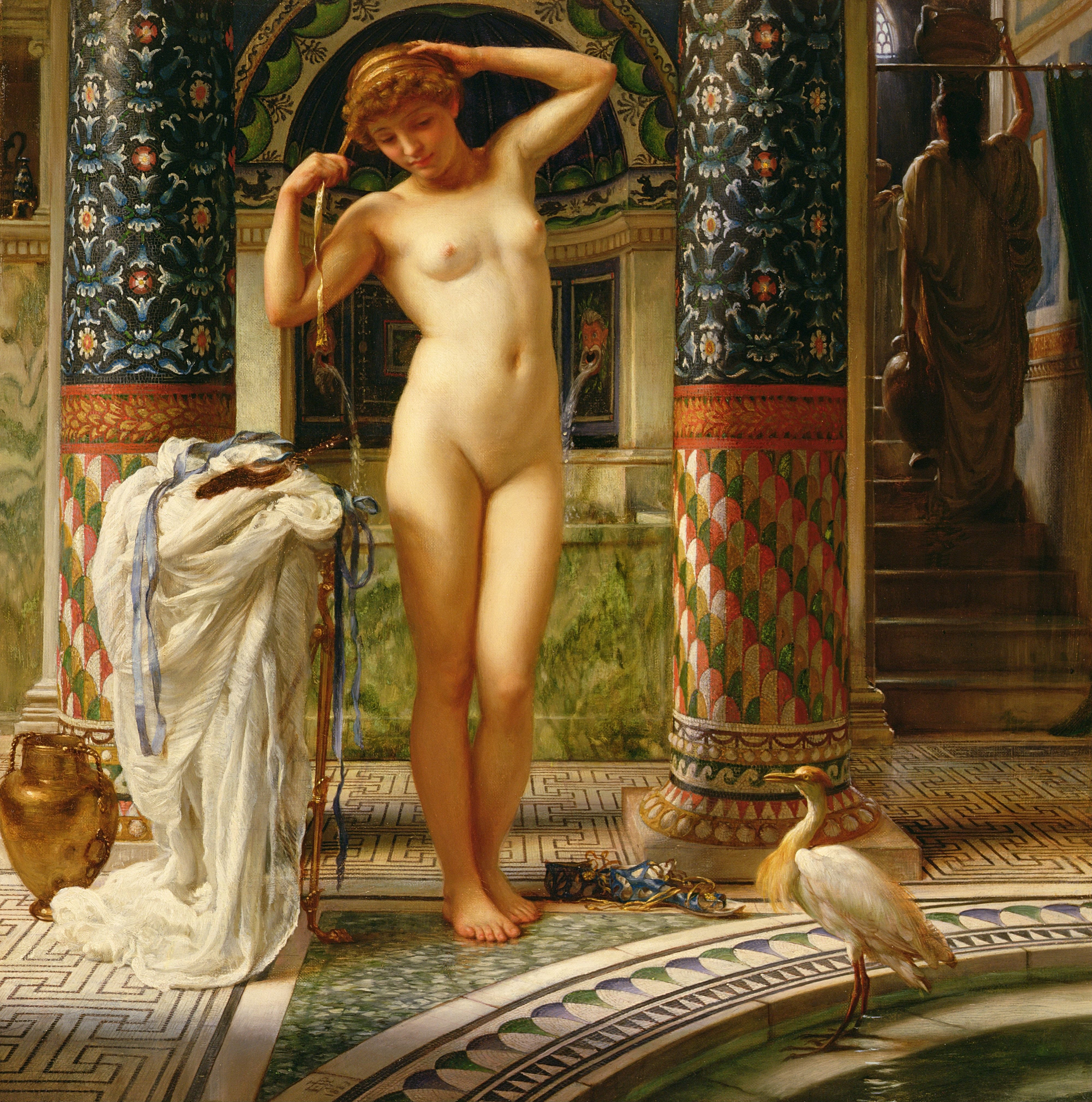
Diadumenè, by Edward Poynter, 1884

The sculpture inspired many artistic reconstructions in the decade after its discovery. Chief among these are Sir Lawrence Alma-Tadema's A Sculptor's Model (1877) and Edward Poynter's Diadumenè (1884). These both portrayed the statue's model binding her hair with a strip of fabric (as with the statue type diadumenos) in preparation for modelling for the sculptor or for taking a bath respectively. Poynter believed this to be the correct reconstruction partly because the remains of the little finger of her left hand are visible on the back of her head, suggesting that her left arm was raised to hold her hair in place, whilst the right hand wound the fabric. At the Museo Centrale Montemartini, the Esquiline Venus is now usually displayed behind a 'pool' (actually a glass floor panel) in tribute to this rendering.

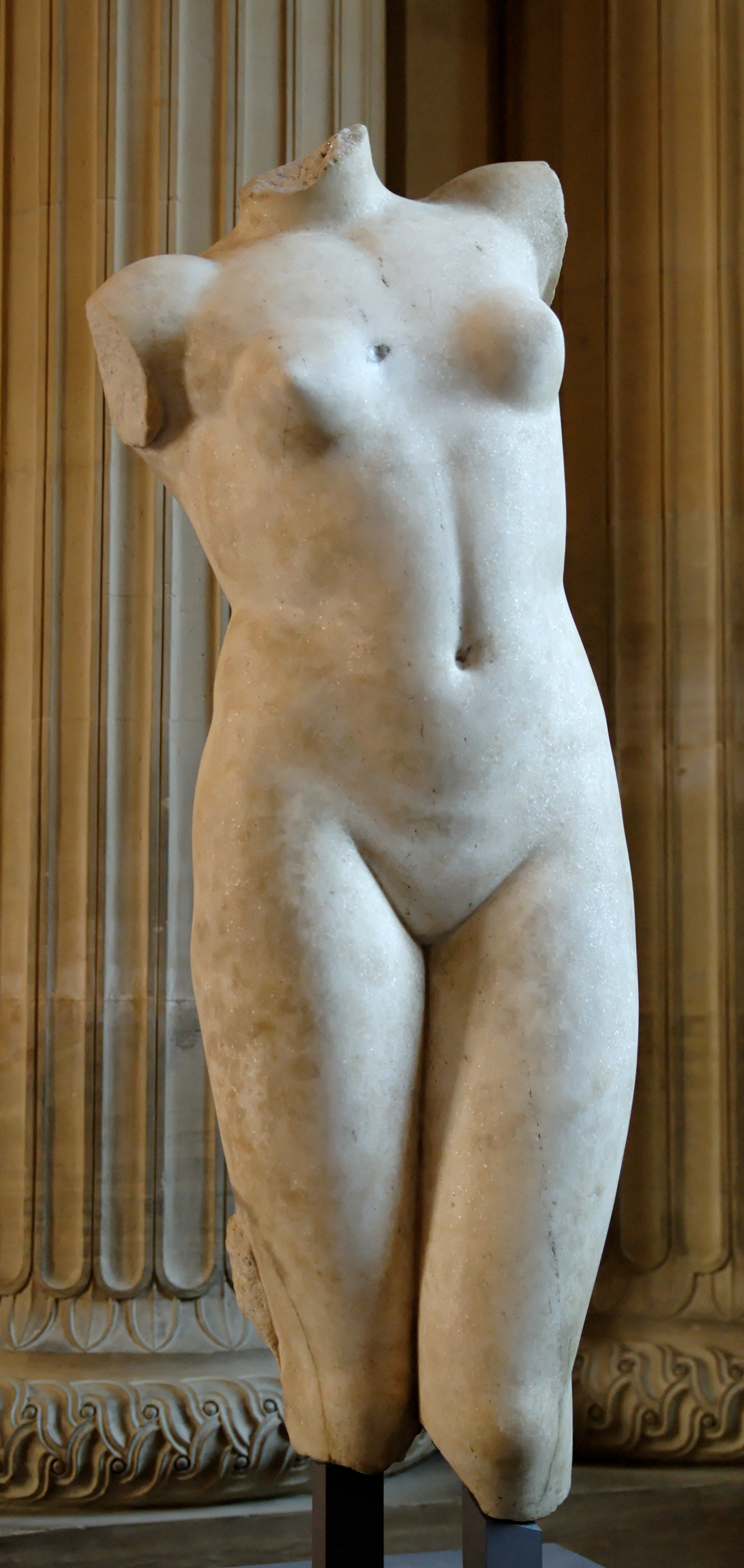
Another torso of this type (Louvre)

== Exhibitions ==
From December 2006 to February 4, 2007, the sculpture was the centrepiece of the exhibition "Cleopatra and the Caesars" at the Bucerius Kunst Forum at Hamburg, following which, from March to June 2007, it was shown at the Louvre for the Praxiteles exhibition.
