= Gaius Clodius Licinus =

Roman historian and senator

Gaius Clodius Licinus (fl. AD 4) was a Roman historian and senator. He served as consul for the second half of the year 4. According to Suetonius (De Grammaticis et Rhetoribus, 20), Licinus was a friend and patron of the author Julius Hyginus.

His history, which has been lost, seems to have comprised at least 21 books, and began with the end of the Second Punic War. Livy's history preserves a fragment, which is believed to be the gloss of a later writer rather than Livy himself.

Preceded by Sextus Aelius Catus; Gaius Sentius Saturninus	Roman consul 4 (suffect); With: Gnaeus Sentius Saturninus	Succeeded by Lucius Valerius Messalla Volesus; Gnaeus Cornelius Cinna Magnus
