= Diadumenè =

Painting by Edward Poynter

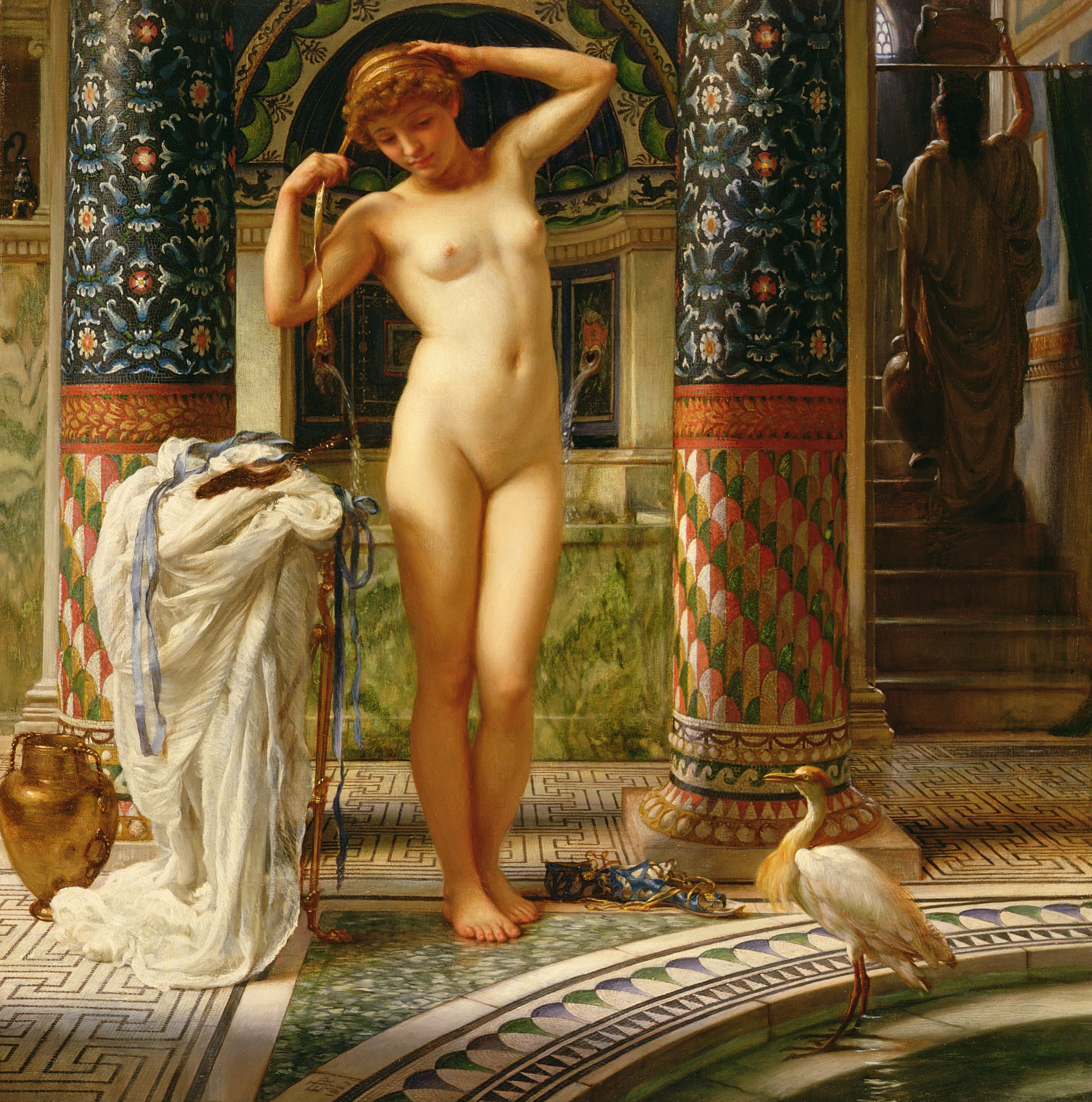
- Artist: Edward Poynter
- Year: 1884
- Medium: Oil on canvas, history painting
- Dimensions: 51 cm × 50.9 cm (20 in × 20.0 in)
- Location: Royal Albert Memorial Museum; Exeter

Diadumenè is an oil painting by the British artist Edward Poynter, from 1884. It is held in the Royal Albert Memorial Museum, in Exeter.

== History and description ==
It depicts a scene taking place in a bathhouse in Ancient Rome, where a naked woman is near the pool, with her clothes nearby. She seems to have undressed herself and is now tying her hair, as she prepares to enter the water. She looks calm and relaxed. A heron is seen in front of her. The work combines history painting and nude art, and draws heavily from archaeological discoveries about the architecture of the era. The female figure is modelled on the Esquiline Venus which had been excavated in 1874 on the Esquiline Hill. The discovery also inspired Lawrence Alma-Tadema's painting A Sculptor's Model (1877). The title Poynter gave the painting makes reference to a female version of the statue Diadumenos, as she is shown in the act of tying her hair.

Pointer displayed the painting to the Royal Academy Exhibition of 1884 at Burlington House, in London, and subsequently at the Grosvenor Gallery. The following year he produced a much larger version, although with a significant amount of drapery added to partially obscure the nudity, to the Royal Academy Exhibition of 1885. The original painting is now at the Royal Albert Memorial Museum, in Exeter.

== Bibliography ==
- Liversidge, Michael & Edwards, Catherine. Imagining Rome British Artists and Rome in the Nineteenth Century. Merrell Holberton, 1996.
- Smith, Alison. The Victorian Nude: Sexuality, Morality, and Art. Manchester University Press, 1996.
