= Commodus (disambiguation) =

Commodus (AD 161–192) was the 17th Roman emperor.

It may also refer to:

- Commodus as Hercules, marble portrait sculpture of Commodus
- Lucius Ceionius Commodus (consul 78), member of the gens Ceionia
- Lucius Ceionius Commodus (consul 106), member of the gens Ceionia
- Lucius Ceionius Commodus (AD 101–138), the birth name of Lucius Aelius
- Lucius Ceionius Commodus or Lucius Aelius Aurelius Commodus (AD 130–169), early names of Lucius Verus (r. 161–169)
- Lucius Aurelius Commodus Pompeianus consul in AD 209, son of Tiberius Claudius Pompeianus and grandson of Emperor Marcus Aurelius, eventually executed by Caracalla
