= Publius Cornelius Lentulus Scipio (consul 2) =

Roman senator active during the reign of the emperor Augustus

Publius Cornelius Lentulus Scipio was a Roman senator son of Publius Cornelius Scipio Salvito active during the reign of the emperor Augustus. He was suffect consul for the second half of AD 2 with Titus Quinctius Crispinus Valerianus as his colleague. He was the earliest member of the Cornelii gens to combine the name of the two most famous branches of that family, the Lentuli and the Scipiones, in his own name.

The fact that another member of the Cornelii Lentuli revived the name of one of its famous but extinct branches, the Maliginensis, in his own name, namely Servius Cornelius Lentulus Maluginensis, consul in the year 10, has led a number of experts to believe the two were brothers. That the filiation of each indicates both were the son of a Gnaeus and grandson of a Gnaeus strengthens this theory. Ronald Syme acquiesced to this identification "until something better comes along." The identity of this Gnaeus Cornelius Lentulus is uncertain: Syme suggests he could be Gnaeus Cornelius Lentulus "the admiral", or he could be Gnaeus Cornelius Lentulus, quaestor Caesaris shortly after the Battle of Actium, but concludes that "little profit will accrue from further speculation in those territories." The latter Gnaeus Cornelius Lentulus is sometimes identified with Gnaeus Cornelius Lentulus Augur.

Little is known of this consul, all of which relates to his descendants. Syme identifies his son as Publius Cornelius Lentulus Scipio, consul in 24.

Political offices
Preceded by Publius Vinicius, and Publius Alfenus Varus as consulares ordinarii	Consul of the Roman Empire; AD 2 with Titus Quinctius Crispinus Valerianus	Succeeded by Lucius Aelius Lamia, and Marcus Servilius as consulares ordinarii
