= Publius Silius =

Roman senator active during the reign of the emperor Augustus

Publius Silius was a Roman senator active during the reign of the emperor Augustus. He was suffect consul in AD 3, replacing Lucius Aelius Lamia; his colleague was Lucius Volusius Saturninus.

Silius was the oldest son of Publius Silius Nerva. He was a member of the tresviri monetalis, the most prestigious of the four boards that form the vigintiviri; Aelius Lamia was one of the other two members of this board at the same time as Silius. Because assignment to this board was usually allocated to patricians, Ronald Syme sees this as evidence that Silius was a member of that class. Silius is also known to have been a legatus legionis or military commander of several legions operating in the Roman territories of Macedonia and Thracia, immediately before he was consul.

Syme notes that after his term as consul, Publius Silius disappears from history.

Political offices
Preceded by Lucius Aelius Lamia, and Marcus Servilius as Ordinary consuls	Suffect consul of the Roman Empire; AD 3 with Lucius Volusius Saturninus	Succeeded by Sextus Aelius Catus, and Gaius Sentius Saturninus as Ordinary consuls
