= Horti Lamiani =

Ancient villa and gardens in Rome

Coordinates: 41.8945°N 12.5047°E

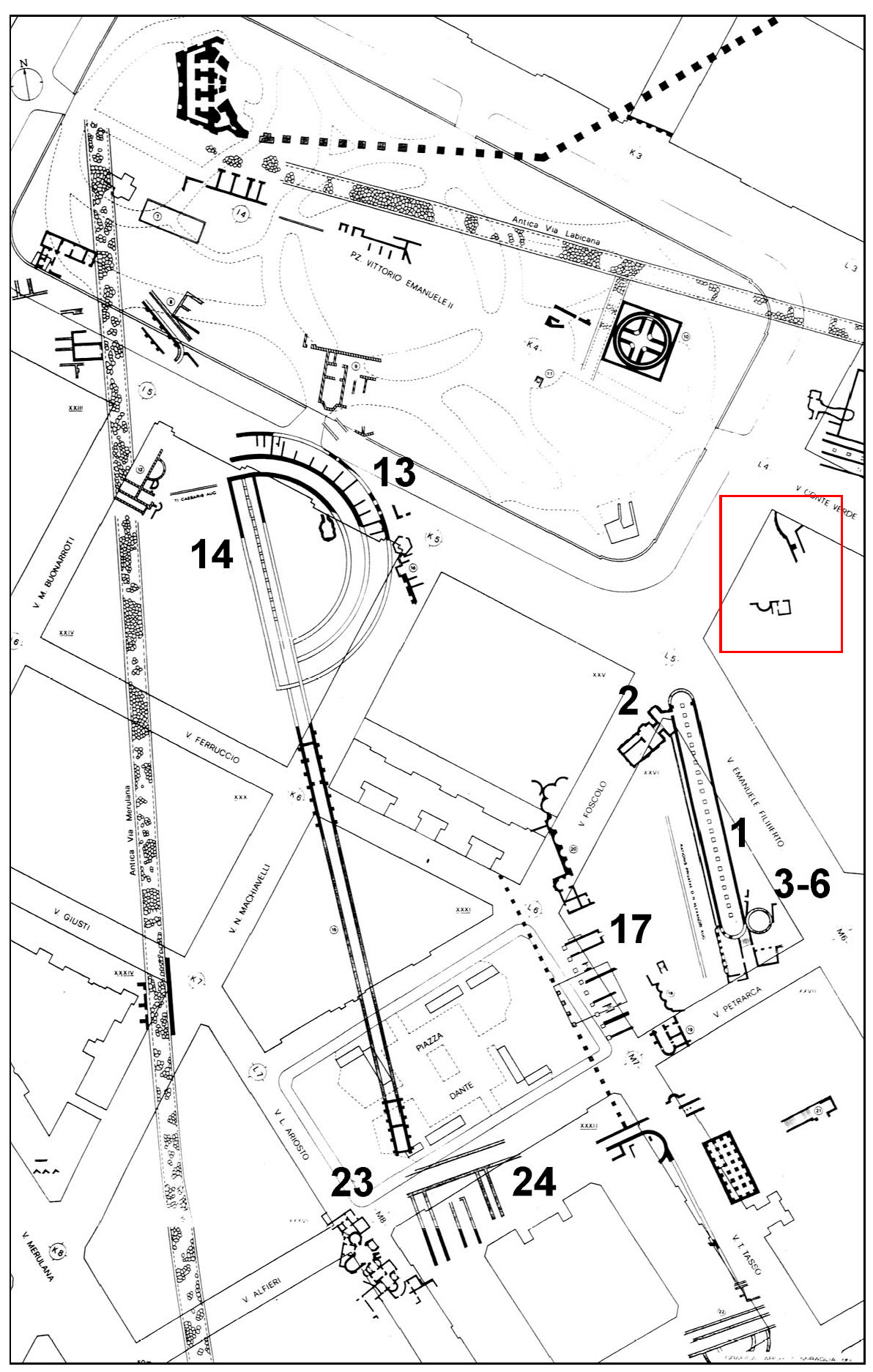
Plan of excavations (Lanciani 1901) with the red box indicating the ENPAM building and museum. 1: Cryptoporticus with opus sectile floor 2: underground rooms where many sculptures were found 3-6: Thermal baths

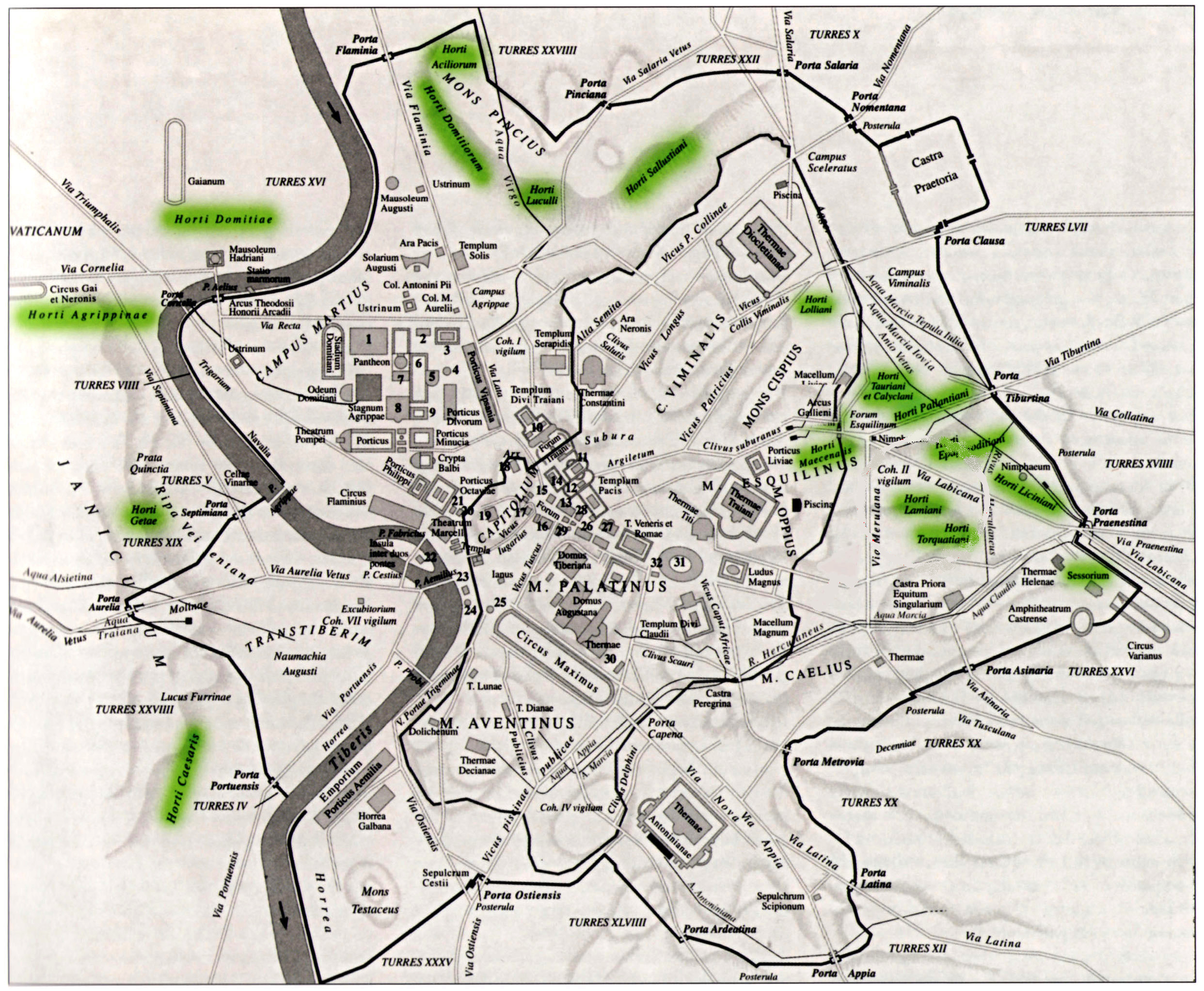
Horti of ancient Rome

The Horti Lamiani (Lamian Gardens) was a luxurious complex consisting of an ancient Roman villa with large gardens and outdoor rooms. It was located on the Esquiline Hill in Rome, in the area around the present Piazza Vittorio Emanuele. The horti were created by the consul Lucius Aelius Lamia, a friend of Emperor Tiberius, and they soon became imperial property. They are of exceptional historical-topographical importance. Along with other ancient Roman horti on the Quirinal, Viminal and Esquiline hills, they were discovered during the construction work for the expansion of Rome at the end of 1800s.

The villa and gardens were scenically divided into pavilions and terraces adapted to the landscape, on a model of Hellenistic tradition. They were eventually filled with exceptional works of art, from original ancient Greek sculptures to exquisite frescoes and marble floors.

The Museo Ninfeo has recently opened on the site.

== History ==
Lucullus started the fashion of building luxurious garden-palaces in the 1st century BC with the construction of his gardens on the Pincian Hill, soon followed by the fabled Gardens of Sallust between the Quirinal, Viminal and Campus Martius, which were the largest and richest in the Roman world at that time. In the 3rd century AD the total number of gardens (horti) occupied about a tenth of Rome and formed a green belt around the centre. As pleasure gardens with small palaces, the horti allowed the rich owner and his court to live in isolated comfort, away from the hectic life of the city but close to it. A fundamental feature of the horti was the large quantity of water necessary for the rich vegetation and for the functioning of the numerous fountains and nymphaea. This area was particularly suitable for these residences as eight of the eleven large aqueducts of the city reached the Esquiline.

The land for the Horti Lamiani was originally a cemetery just outside the ancient Servian Wall but was purchased by Lucius Aelius Lamia (Roman consul in 3 AD) who developed the property at the end of the 1st c. BC. He seems to have bequeathed the property to his friend the emperor Tiberius, and it became imperial state property. Emperor Caligula loved the place so much he established his residence there and further developed the property. In an evocative eyewitness account, the philosopher Philo visited the horti in 40 AD and accompanied Caligula inspecting the elaborate residence and ordering rooms to be made more sumptuous. Caligula was briefly buried at the site.

The Horti Lamiani adjoined the Gardens of Maecenas and the Gardens of Maiani. Under Claudius (41–54) the Horti Lamiani and Maiani were united and administered by a special superintendent (procurator hortorum Lamianorum et Maianorum).

Using the known location of the gardens of Maecenas astride the Servian Walls, the boundaries of the Horti Lamiani can be reconstructed: their western border ran along the ancient Via Merulana almost coinciding with the vicolo di S. Matteo (today no longer existing); to the north, the topographic limit was probably the ancient via Labicana, roughly corresponding to the current via Principe Eugenio. Otherwise, towards the valley between the Esquiline and the Caelian the boundaries remain uncertain: perhaps the Horti Lamiani were limited to the south and east by the ancient road at the bottom of the valley, which remains nameless, today traced from the current via Labicana and viale Manzoni.

The property survived until at least the Severan dynasty (193–235), when it had become the emperor's private property as shown by a stamped lead water pipe. By the 4th c. the gardens were no longer in use as evidenced by the statuary found broken in pieces and used in the foundations of a number of spas.

The Villa Palombara was built in 1620 in the ancient Horti Lamiani near the modern Piazza Vittorio Emanuele II of which the Porta Magica remains as the only vestiges. The palace was destroyed between 1882 and 1887, together with the nearby villas Altieri and Astalli to make way for the construction of the new Piazza Vittorio Emanuele II.

== Excavations ==
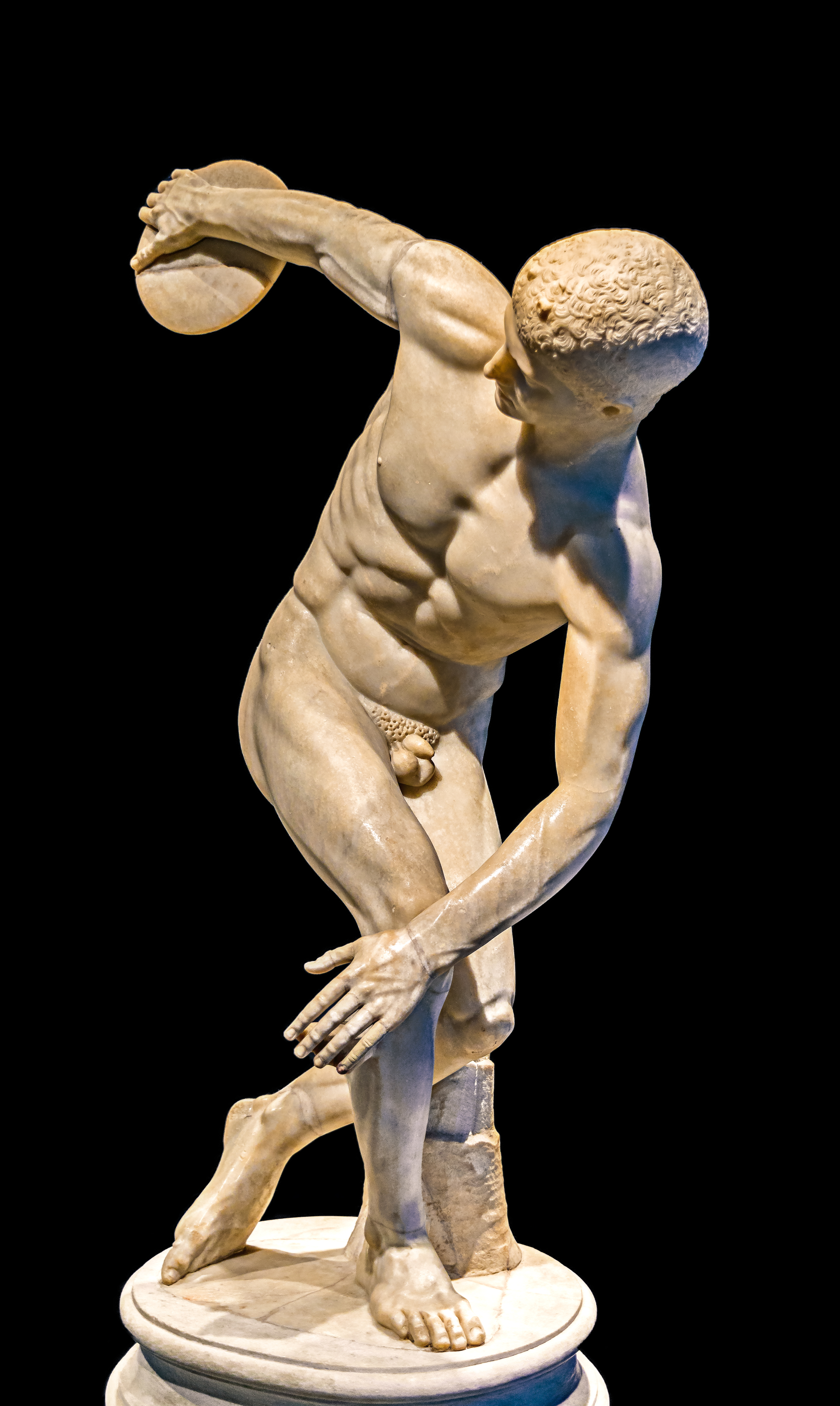
Discobolus (Palazzo Massimo)

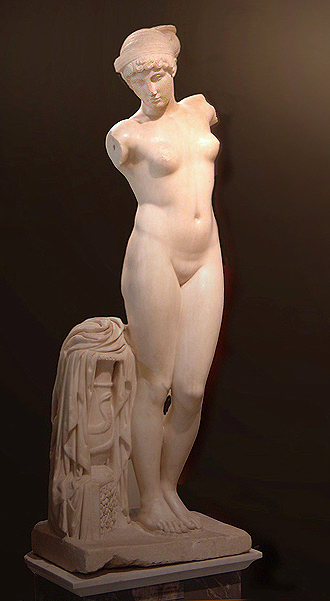
Esquiline Venus, Horti Lamiani (Capitoline Museums)

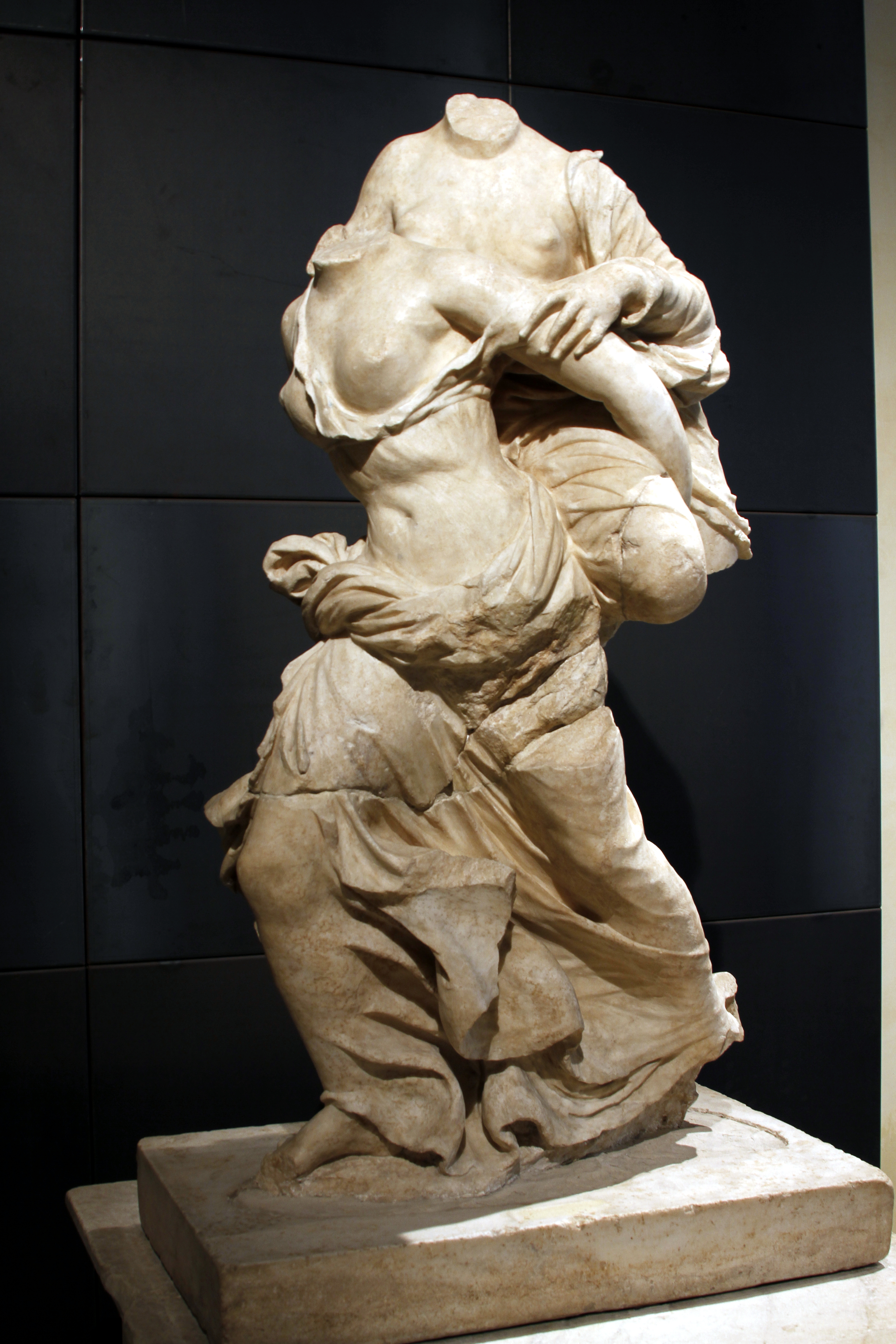
Ephedrismos (Ancient Greek original, Capitoline Museums)

The first discoveries took place in the 16th century, and finds of beautiful statues such as a Roman copy of the ancient Greek Discobolus, the thirteen Medici Niobids (a variant of the Laocoön and His Sons), and the fresco Nozze Aldobrandini were unearthed and which are now in museums. It became clear that the statues were in many cases artistic masterpieces.

In the 19th century Rodolfo Lanciani noticed ancient remains in building works in the area and found beautiful sculptures in subsequent excavations he organised. Decorations of the complex included frescoes, architectural elements in coloured marbles, and innumerable gilt-bronze sheets with inset gemstones. He reported:

I saw a gallery seventy-nine metres long (a cryptoporticus), the floor of which was made up of the rarest and most expensive varieties of alabaster and the ceiling supported by twenty-four fluted columns of antique yellow, resting on gilded bases; I saw another room, paved with slabs of peacock eyes, whose walls were covered with black slate plates, decorated with graceful arabesques executed in gold leaf; and finally I saw a third room, the floor of which was made up of alabaster segments, framed by glass pastegreens. In the walls of it were all around various jets of water one metre away from each other, which had to cross in various ways, with extraordinary light effect. All these things were discovered in November 1875.

A collapse of land had revealed an underground chamber (cryptoporticus) full of statues. The first to appear was a semi-colossal head of Bacchus, crowned with ivy and corymbs and eventually others appeared:

- the semi-extended body of Bacchus
- the busts of two Tritons on whose hair traces of gilding were preserved
- the magnificent bust of Commodus as Hercules bordered by tritons and the various parts of the complex allegory
- two statues of Muses
- the beautiful statue of Esquiline Venus preparing to enter the bathroom by tying a ribbon around her hair.

Parts of the complex of the Horti Lamiani were brought to light in these excavations but were quickly re-buried.

Other important sculptural finds connected with the gardens are the so-called Ephedrismòs (in the Capitoline Museums) from the Piazza Dante and the statues at the Centrale Montemartini from the thermal complex of via Ariosto. The statues became dispersed in various museums and their exact provenance was lost, but in recent years their provenance has been painstakingly reconstructed by Häuber.

The unity of the archaeological context was recreated for the exhibition "The quiet abodes of the gods" in 1986 based on the archives of Lanciani and on municipal deposits.

Excavations in 2005–6 took place during the construction of metro line A in the gardens of Piazza Vittorio Emanuele II. and identified a building nucleus of about 160 m^{2} and about 50 m north of the crytoporticus complex. These are datable between the end of the 1st century BC and the middle of the 3rd century AD and involve successive modifications of rooms around a mosaic-paved corridor and their repaving.

Between 2006 and 2009 excavations found unknown areas of the Horti Lamiani under the future ENPAM building, where Lanciani had documented the long cryptoporticus with an alabaster floor and precious wall decorations, punctuated by columns in precious yellow giallo antico marble with bases in gilded stucco.

Studies of the site using archaeobiological techniques have uncovered the types of plants that the garden would have contained in Roman times. Evidence has been found for the existence of pear, apple and olive trees, ornamental shrubs such as Buxus and Taxus, and flowering plants such as buttercups and carnations. Overall, 40 different plant taxa were found which suggests that a vegetable garden may have been present alongside the larger ornamental gardens.

== Museo Ninfeo ==
The museum is centred on a Roman hall attributed to Alexander Severus (222–235), who built the nearby nymphaeum of Alexander (known as the Trophies of Marius), by stamped water pipes (fistulae aquariae) which prove emperor's ownership. The hundreds of fragments of painted plaster and precious decorative materials, date the imperial residence and are extremely refined, and the new sector is related to the complex discovered by Lanciani by decorative marble elements identical to those unearthed in the nineteenth century.

== Gallery ==
Works from the horti:

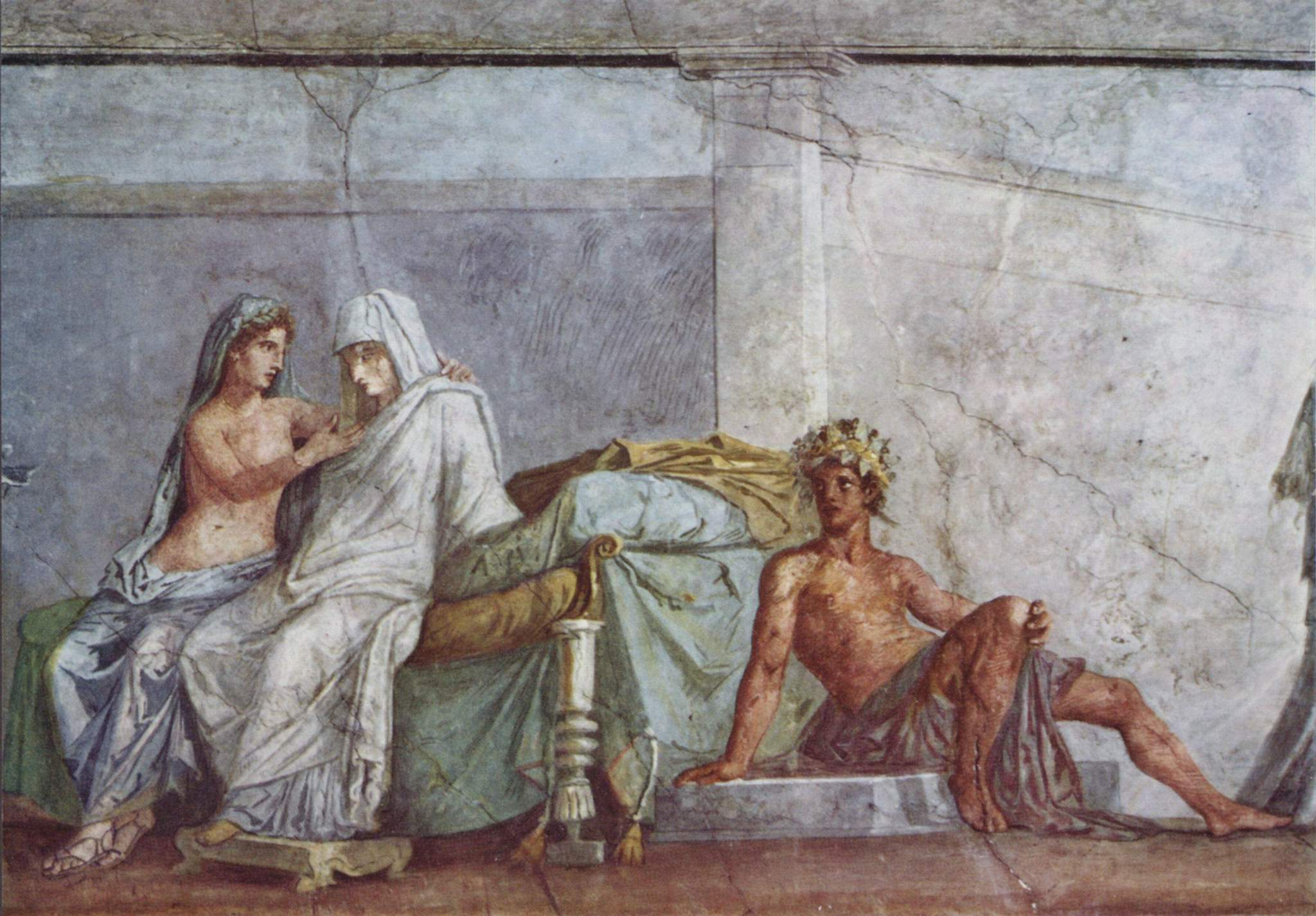
Aldobrandini Marriage fresco

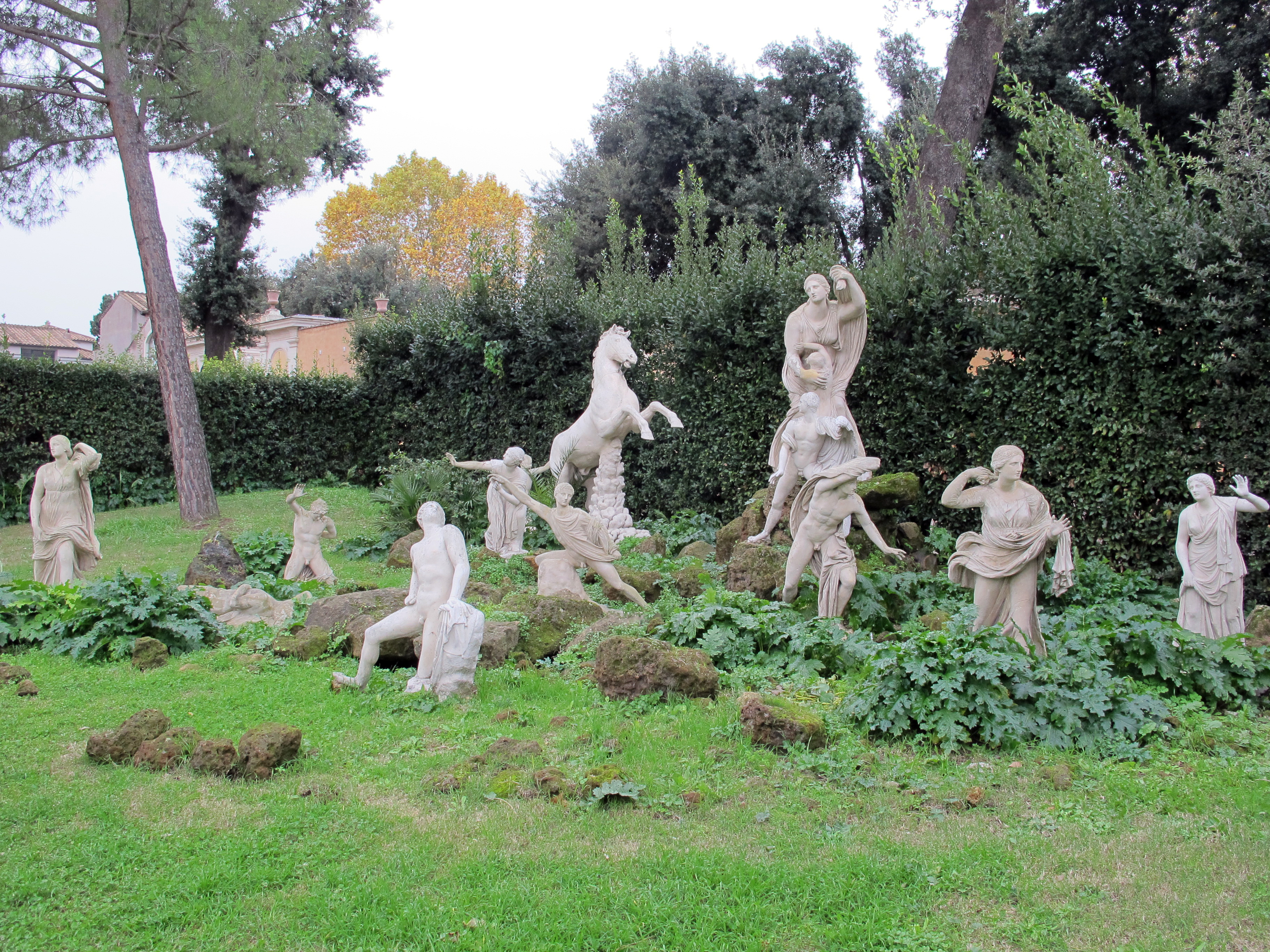
Niobids (Villa Medici)

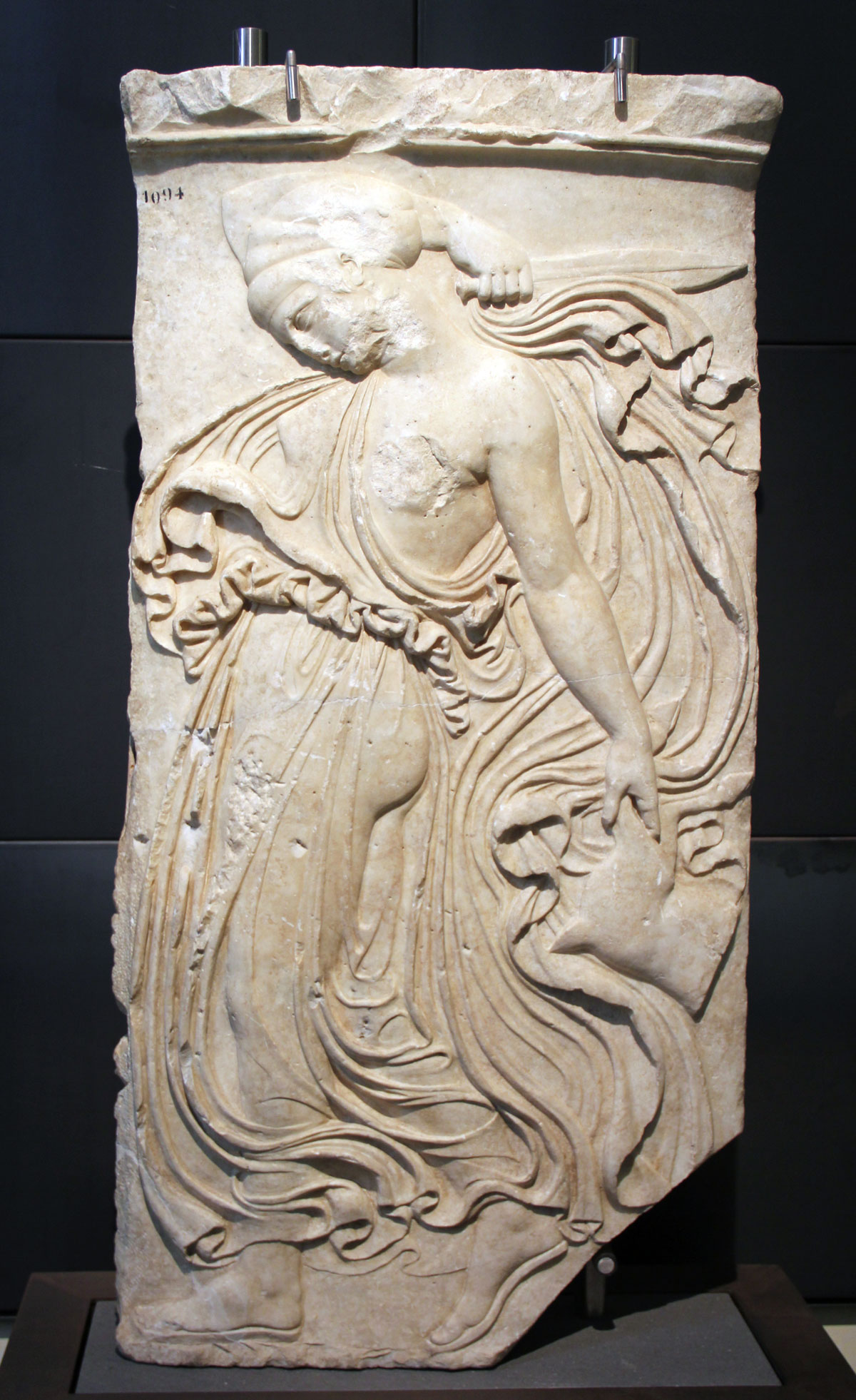
Bacchante

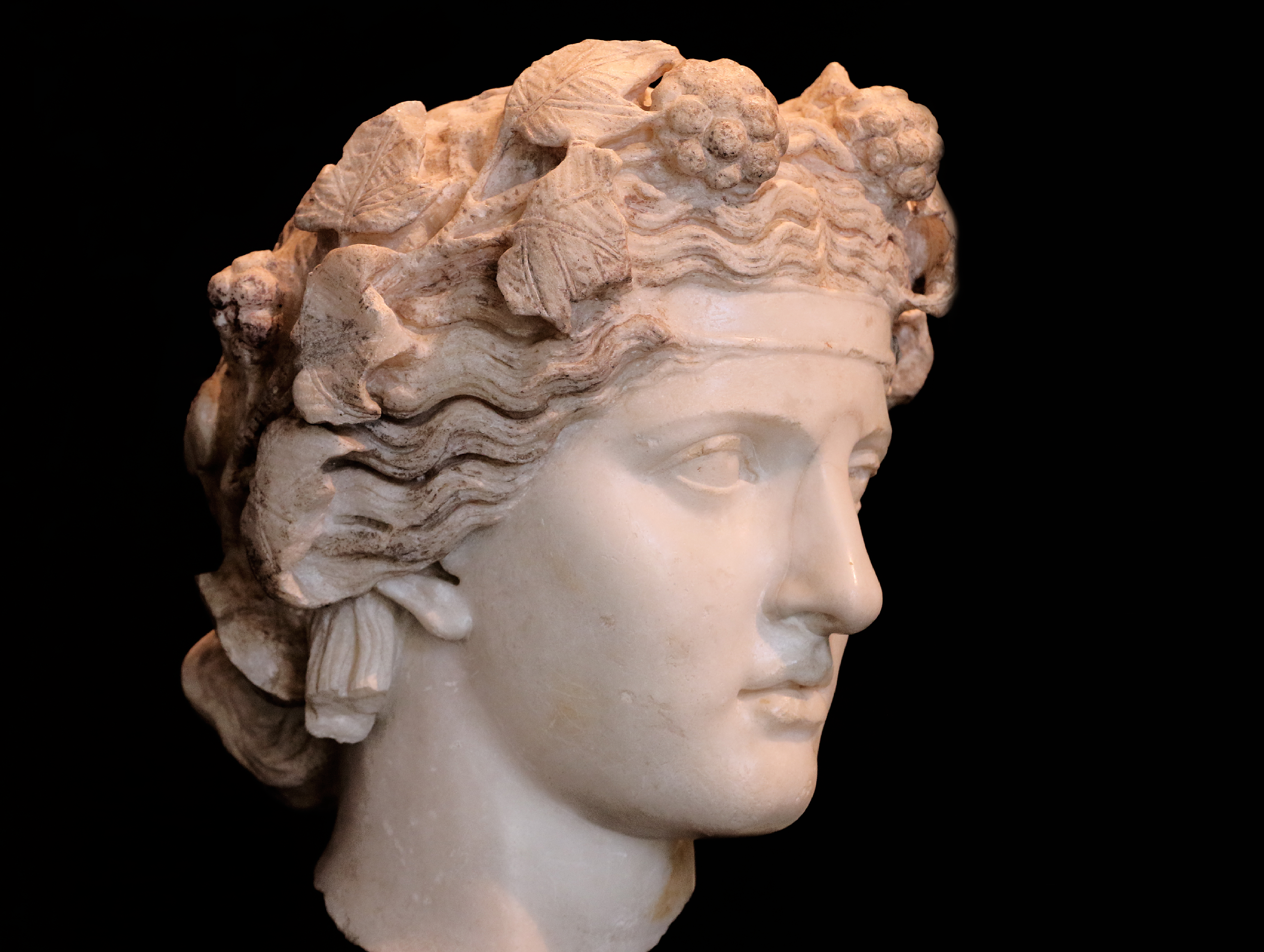
Dionysus (Capitoline Museums)

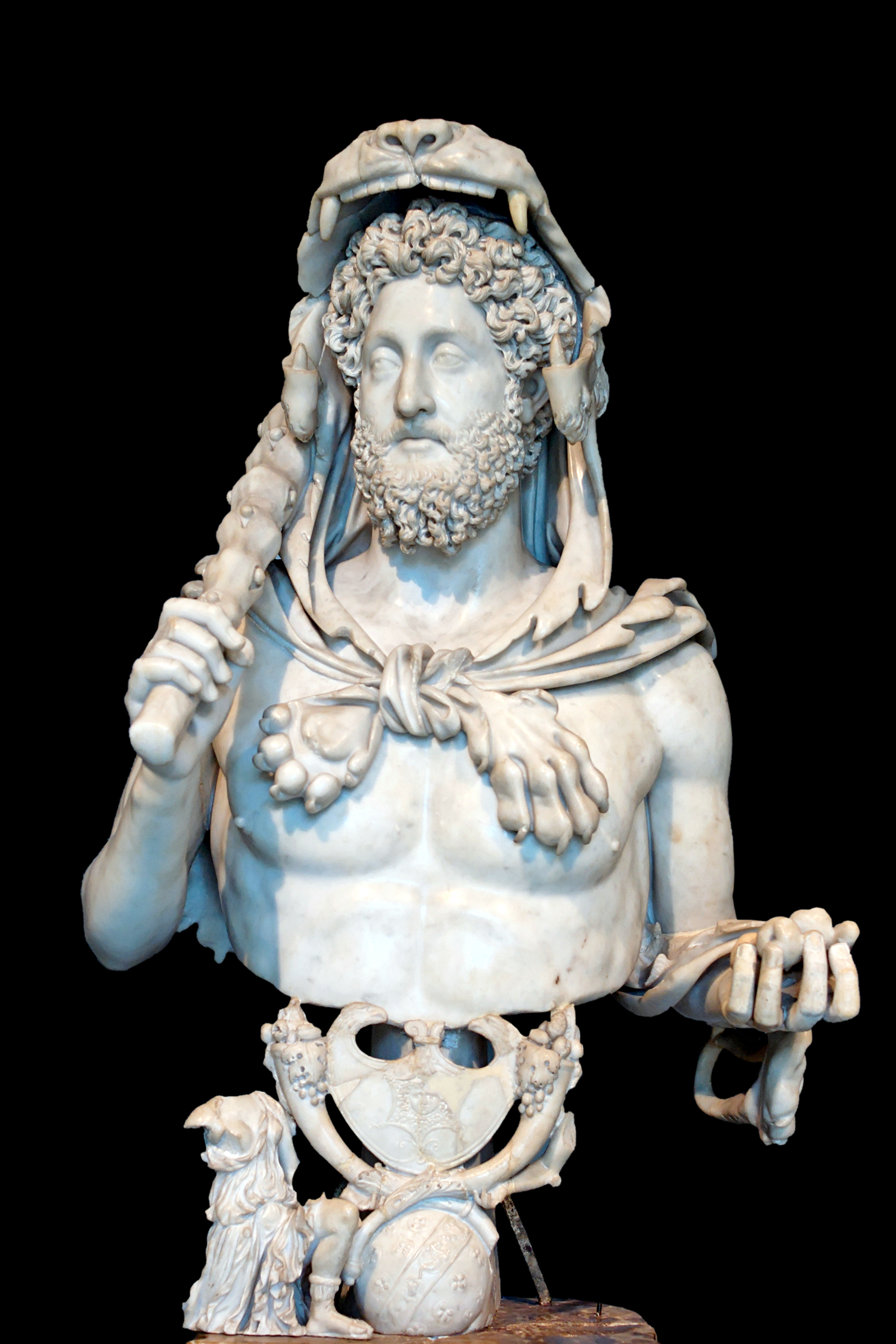
Commodus as Hercules (Capitoline Museums)

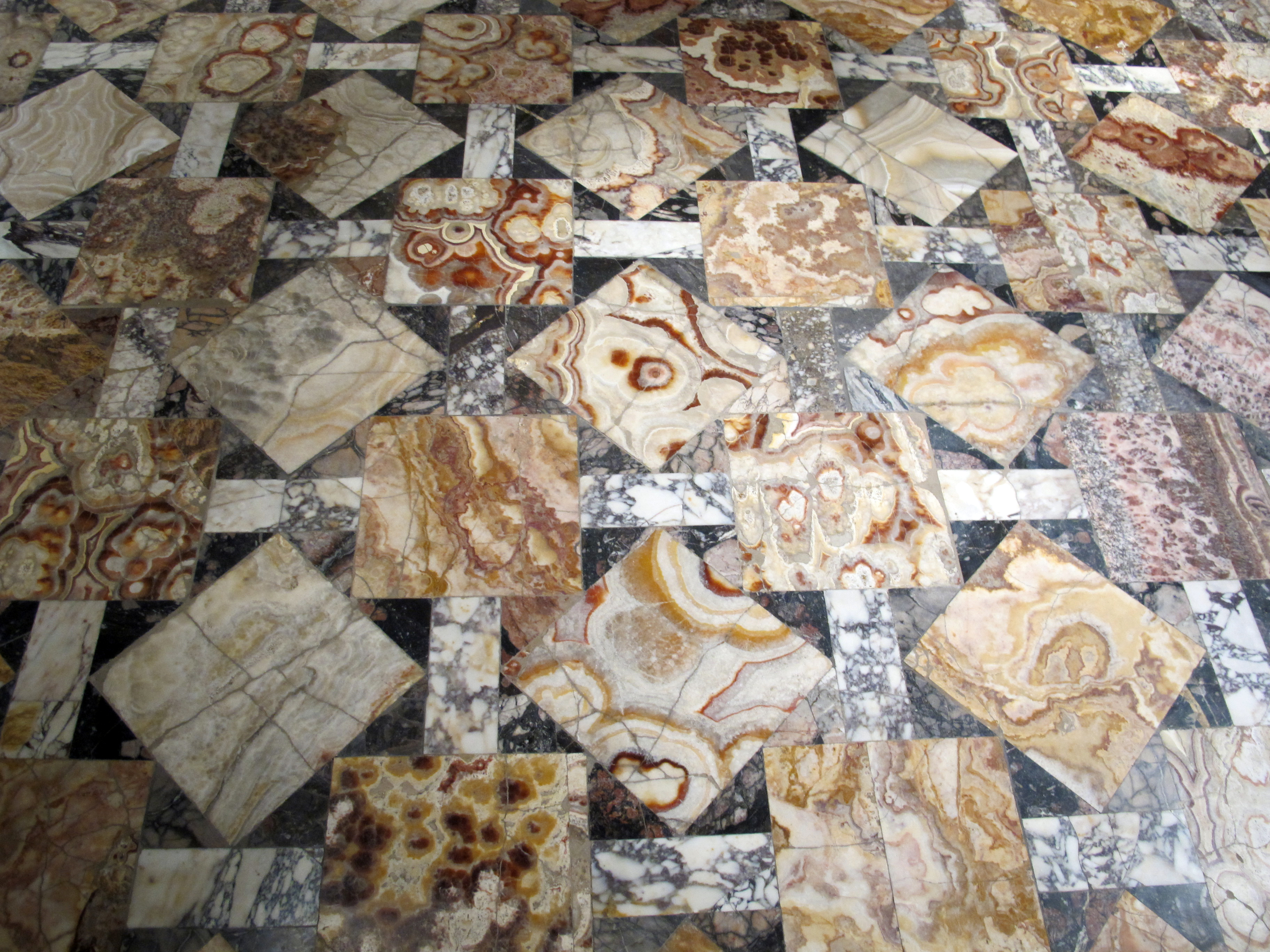
Opus sectile marble floor, part of the "Alabaster floor" (Capitoline Museums)

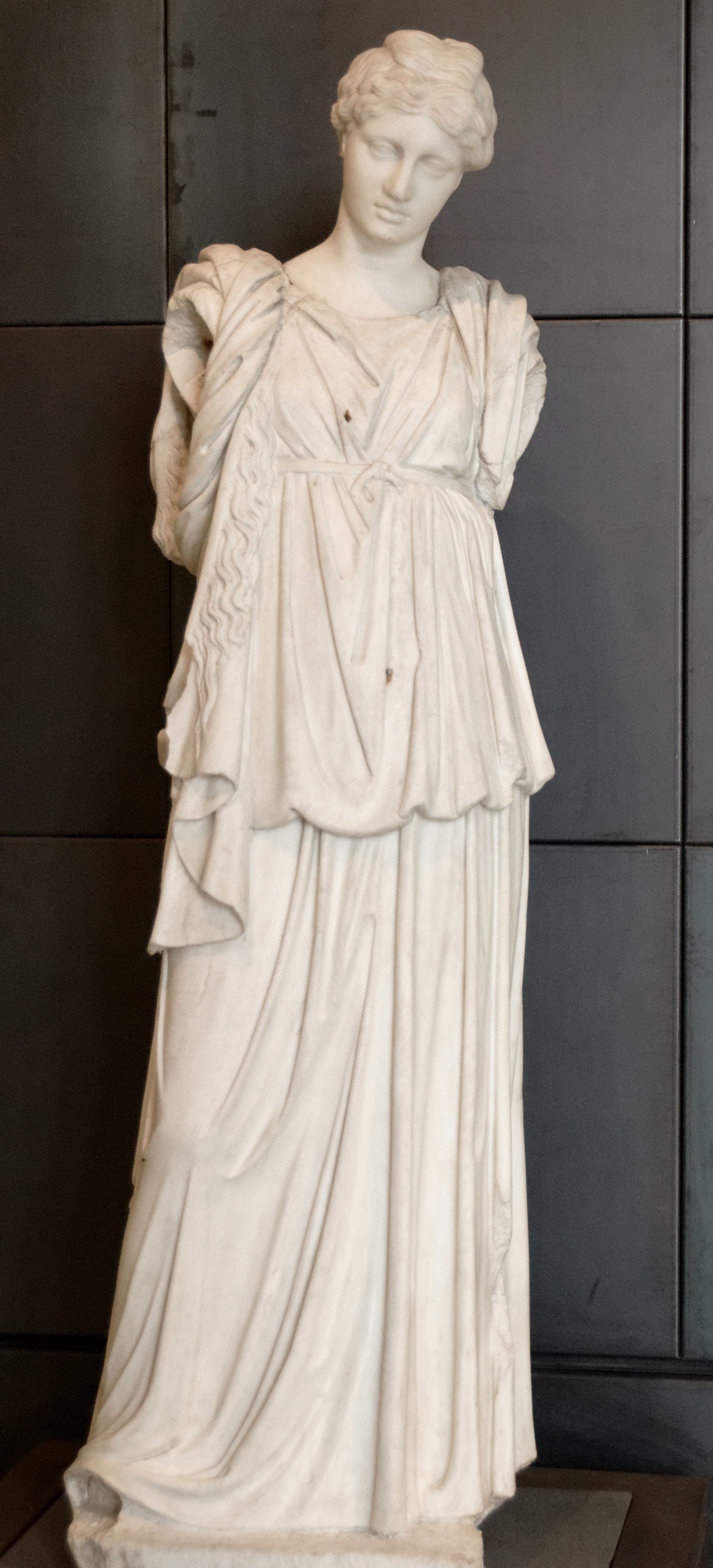
Woman in chiton (Capitoline Museums)

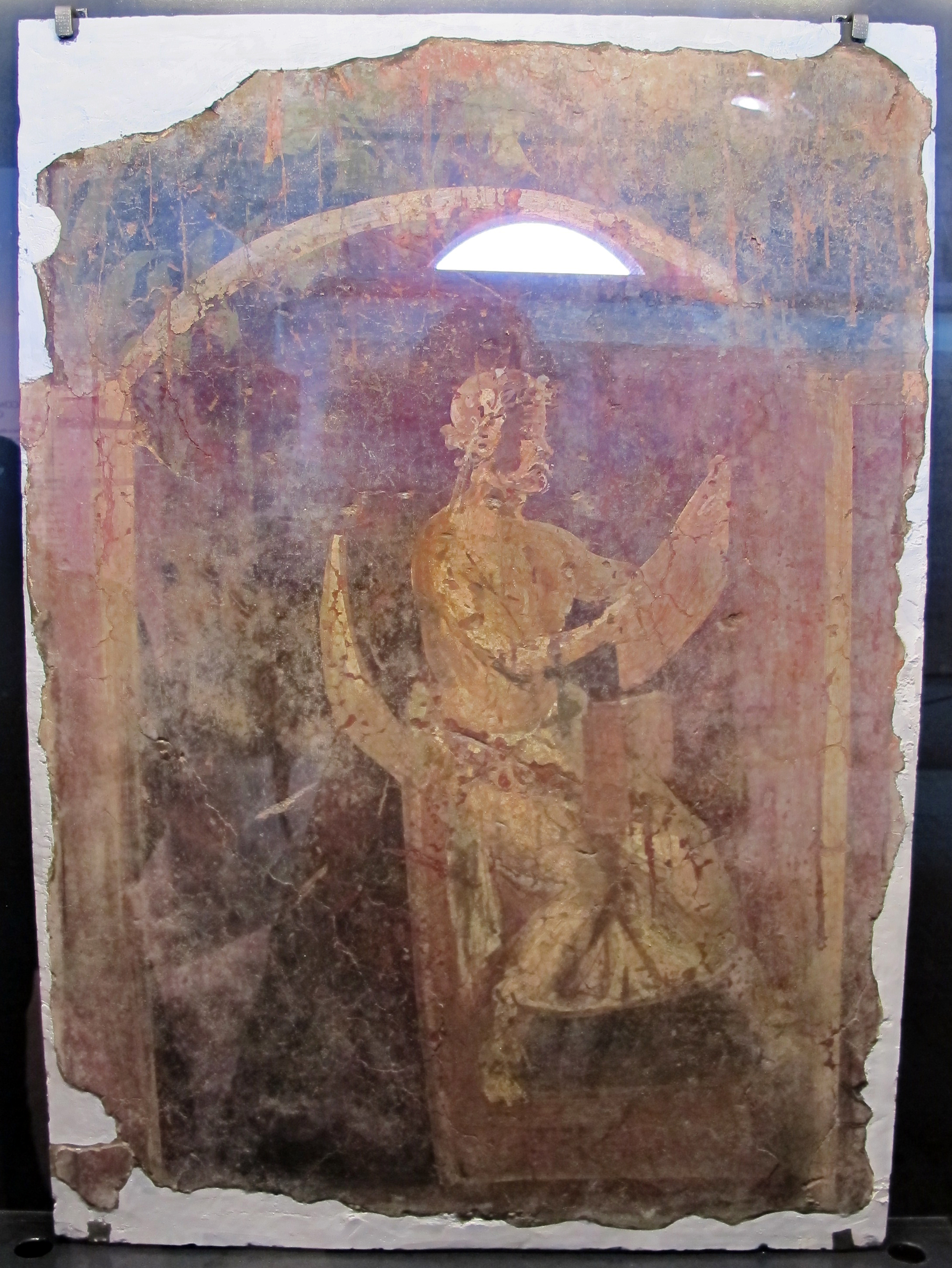
Painting of a poet, 50-100 AD (Centrale Montemartini)

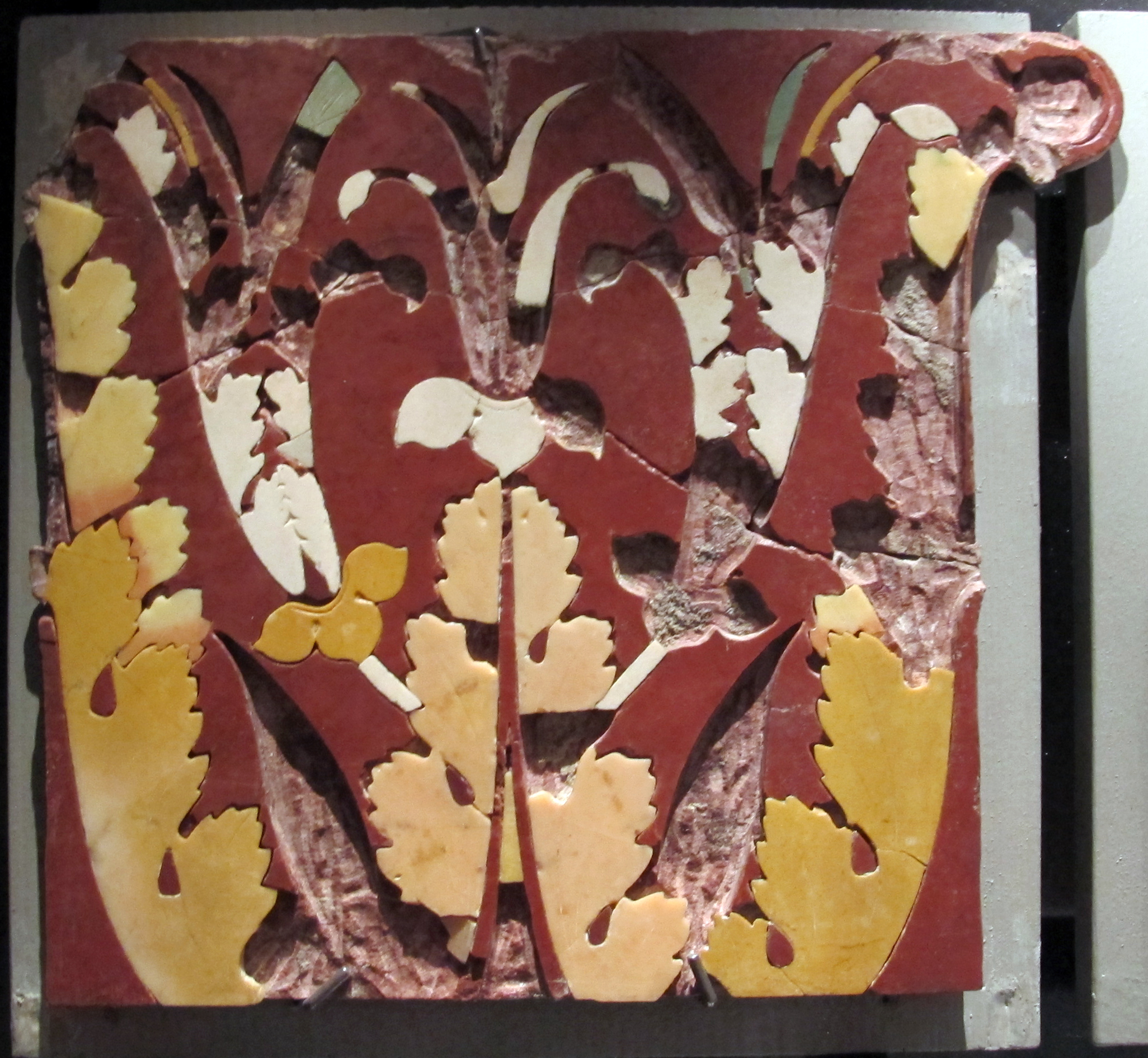
Capital in opus sectile with rosso antico

== See also ==
- Roman gardens
