= Lucius Volusius Saturninus (consul 3) =

Roman senator and official (38/37 BC–56 AD)

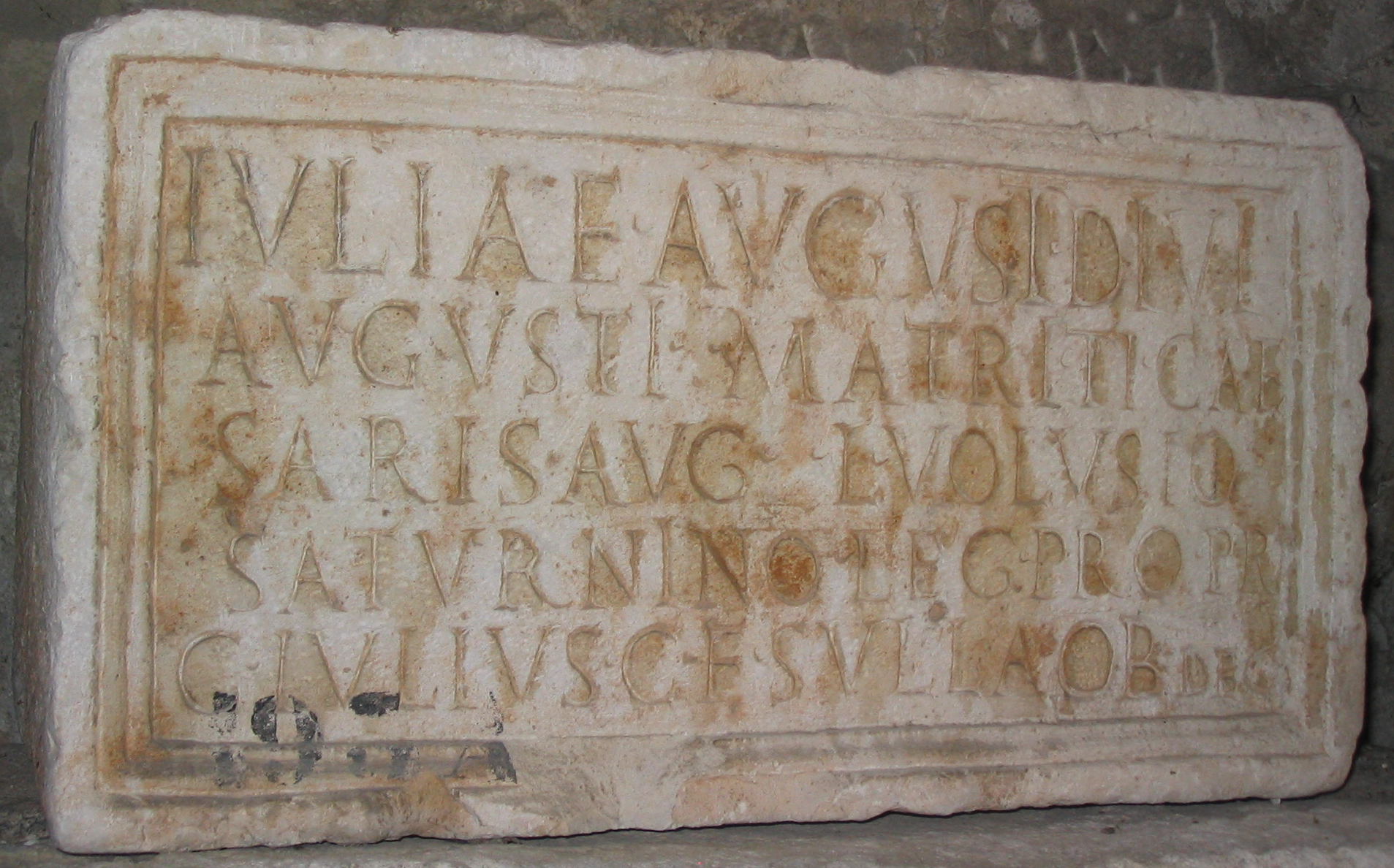
- The inscription CIL III, 9972, attesting him as governor of Dalmatia

suffect consul

Personal details
- Born: 38/37 BC
- Died: 56 AD (aged 93)

Lucius Volusius Saturninus (38/37 BC – 56 AD) was a Roman senator from the powerful plebeian Volusia gens, or family. He held several offices in the emperor's service. Saturninus attracted the attention of his contemporaries for his long life: he died at the age of 93, and having sired a son at the age of 62.

== Biography ==
=== Early life ===
Saturninus was the son of Lucius Volusius Saturninus, a cousin of emperor Tiberius, and Nonia Polla, the daughter of Lucius Nonius Asprenas, consul in 36 BC. He had a sister named Volusia Saturnina who was the mother of empress Lollia Paulina, wife of emperor Caligula.

=== Career ===
His career is known from three inscriptions recovered from Nin in the Dalmatian region of Croatia. They present some difficulties. They are in fragmentary condition, but their pieces supplement each other allowing the gaps in their texts to be restored. Further, these inscriptions only document all but one of the offices he held after he was consul—the last one is known from literary sources—and the entries appear to be out of chronological order.

Saturninus was elected suffect consul for the nundinium July to December of AD 3, as the colleague of Publius Silius. Here we learn he was a member of two Roman priesthoods: the sodales Augustales and the sodales Titii. Obviously the first did not exist until the emperor Augustus was deified after his death (AD 14), so he may have been admitted to the second first. Then we learn he was a legatus pro praetore or governor of two unnamed provinces, one during the reign of Augustus (thus falling before AD 14), the other under the reign of Tiberius (14-37); it was not the practice in the early years of the Principate to name the province one governed, so that information is missing. The identity of one province is obvious, for these inscriptions—as well as several others—have been found in the territory of Roman Dalmatia. Saturninus was governor of Dalmatia for an extended time, for emperor Tiberius fell into the habit of prolonging the tenure of his governors: instead of a term of the usual three years, when Publius Cornelius Dolabella was appointed governor of Dalmatia in the year 14, he was there at least five years, or until 19 or 20, when Saturninus replaced him. Saturninus, in turn, found his tenure prolonged, remaining as governor, according to Ronald Syme, "into the reign of Caligula". The other province has been identified as Galatia-Pamphylia.

Following his return to Rome, Saturninus obtained the religious title of Augur, the latest title recorded on the Dalmatian inscriptions. Literary sources report that within a few years of returning to Rome he was also appointed Urban prefect, which office he held until his death.

== Reputation and posthumous honors ==
When Saturninus died at the age of 93, according to Tacitus, he had accumulated a conspicuous fortune, had an honorable reputation, and through wisdom avoided the malevolence of many of the emperors. When he died, the Senate, under the sponsorship of Emperor Nero, ordered a state funeral and the erection of a number of statues throughout Rome. The statues included a bronze one in the Forum of Augustus, two marble statues in the temple of the Deified Augustus, one consular statue in the temple of the Deified Julius, another on the Palatium intra Tripylum, a third in the forecourt of Apollo in sight of the curia, a statue as Augur, an equestrian statue and a statue on a curule chair sitting near the Theatre of Pompey.

== Descendants ==
Saturninus married the aristocrat Cornelia Lentula, the daughter of the consul of 3 BC, Lucius Cornelius Lentulus. Cornelia bore Saturninus two sons: Lucius Volusius Saturninus, who became pontiff, and Quintus Volusius Saturninus, consul of 56.

Political offices
Preceded by Lucius Aelius Lamia, and Marcus Servilius as Ordinary consuls	Suffect consul of the Roman Empire; AD 3 with Publius Silius	Succeeded by Sextus Aelius Catus, and Gaius Sentius Saturninus as Ordinary consuls
