= Publius Vinicius =

Publius Vinicius was a Roman senator active during the reigns of Emperors Augustus and Tiberius. He was the son of Marcus Vinicius, consul in 19 BC.

Vinicius was ordinary consul in AD 2 with Publius Alfenus Varus, and was an imperial legate for Macedonia and Thracia. There he commanded a legion as military tribune under Lucius Calpurnius Piso. Several years after his consulate, Vinicius was proconsular governor of Asia at some point between AD 10 and 15, but probably in AD 10/11.

His son Marcus Vinicius was consul in AD 30 and a second time in the year 45.

Political offices
Preceded by Gaius Julius Caesar, and Marcus Herennius Picens	Consul of the Roman Empire; AD 2 with Publius Alfenus Varus	Succeeded by Publius Cornelius Lentulus Scipio, and Titus Quinctius Crispinus Valerianus as Suffect consuls
