= Titus Quinctius Crispinus Valerianus =

Roman senator

Titus Quinctius Crispinus Valerianus was a Roman senator, who was active during the reign of Augustus. He was suffect consul in the second half of AD 2 as the colleague of Publius Cornelius Lentulus Scipio.

Crispinus Valerianus was of Patrician descent, but his familial connections beyond that are unclear. He could be the biological son of a Valerius who was adopted by Titus Quinctius Crispinus Sulpicianus, one of the alleged lovers of Julia the Elder; or the son of a Quinctius Crispinus and a Valeria; or even the brother of Crispinus Sulpicianus.

One certain event in his life is the date of his praetorship, which was in 2 BC; this allows us to infer he acceded to the consulate anno suo, and fixing the year of his birth as 32 BC. We know that he was a member of the Arval Brethren, for inscriptions confirm his presence at their ceremonies from AD 14 through 27. He likely died before the end of the reign of Tiberius.

Political offices
Preceded by Publius Vinicius, and Publius Alfenus Varus as consulares ordinarii	Suffect consul of the Roman Empire; AD 2 with Publius Cornelius Lentulus Scipio	Succeeded by Lucius Aelius Lamia, and Marcus Servilius as consulares ordinarii
