= Sextus Aelius Catus =

Sextius Aelius Catus was a Roman senator and consul ordinarius for 4 AD with Gaius Sentius Saturninus as his colleague. Catus was the father of Aelia Paetina, the second wife of the emperor Claudius from 28 AD to about 31 AD (when Aelia's adoptive brother Sejanus fell from power). His only known grandchild was Aelia and Claudius's daughter Claudia Antonia, born in 30.

Catus was possibly descended from Sextus Aelius Q.f. Paetus Catus, consul of 198 BC and later a censor, or possibly from Quintus Aelius Tubero, consul in 11 BC. His daughter Aelia Paetina is said to belong to the Aelii Tuberones, implying a descent from the consul of 11 BC.

Except for his consulship, the only position Catus is known to have held was governorship of Moesia. This is based on a mention by Strabo that Catus moved 50,000 Getae across the Danube and settled them in Moesia. When he held this appointment is uncertain: Ronald Syme speculates that he was either a praetorian governor which would date his tenure before AD 4, or a consular governor which would date him to AD 9–11.

Political offices
Preceded by Publius Silius, and Lucius Volusius Saturninus as consules suffecti	Consul of the Roman Empire; AD 4 with Gaius Sentius Saturninus	Succeeded by Gnaeus Sentius Saturninus, and Gaius Clodius Licinus as consules suffecti
