= Marcus Servilius =

Roman senator active during the reigns of emperors Augustus and Tiberius

Marcus Servilius was a Roman senator who was active during the reigns of the emperors Augustus and Tiberius. He was ordinary consul in AD 3 as the colleague of Lucius Aelius Lamia.

Servilius was the son of Marcus Servilius, plebeian tribune in 43 BC. Both were descended from Gaius Servilius Geminus, the praetor who had renounced his patrician status. The consul Servilius married the daughter of the Nonius whom Mark Antony proscribed over the possession of a gem. Their son was the historian Servilius Nonianus, himself consul in AD 35.

Tacitus twice mentions Servilius in passing. The first time was when the emperor Tiberius assigned to him the entire estate of Patuleius, a wealthy equites, even though Patuleius had made the emperor heir to part of his fortune; this gift came in the year 17. In doing this, Tiberius commented that "noble rank ought to have the support of wealth", suggesting that Servilius was relatively impoverished compared to other senators. The second mention was when Aemilia Lepida, ex-wife of Publius Sulpicius Quirinius, was on trial for adultery, attempted murder through poison, and use of astrology against the Imperial house. The emperor Tiberius, who presided over the case, compelled Servilius to provide testimony to defend Quirinius. Ronald Syme notes an inscription from Pisidian Antioch that suggests Servilius and Quirinius were possibly friends: the inscription records the two men as successive honorary duoviri of the city. "Quirinius had been Caesar's legate governing the province Galatia-Pamphylia," Syme writes. "What then was the rank and function that explains the honouring of Servilius? Perhaps a legate under Quirinius in his war against the Homonadenses. Perhaps rather governor of Galatia -- either before or after his consulship."

Little is known about the rest of his life, nor when Servilius died.

Political offices
Preceded by P. Cornelius Lentulus Scipio; T. Quinctius Crispinus Valerianus as suffecti	Roman consul January–June AD 3 with Lucius Aelius Lamia	Succeeded by Sex. Aelius Catus; Gaius Sentius Saturninus as suffecti
