= A Sculptor's Model =

Painting by Lawrence Alma–Tadema

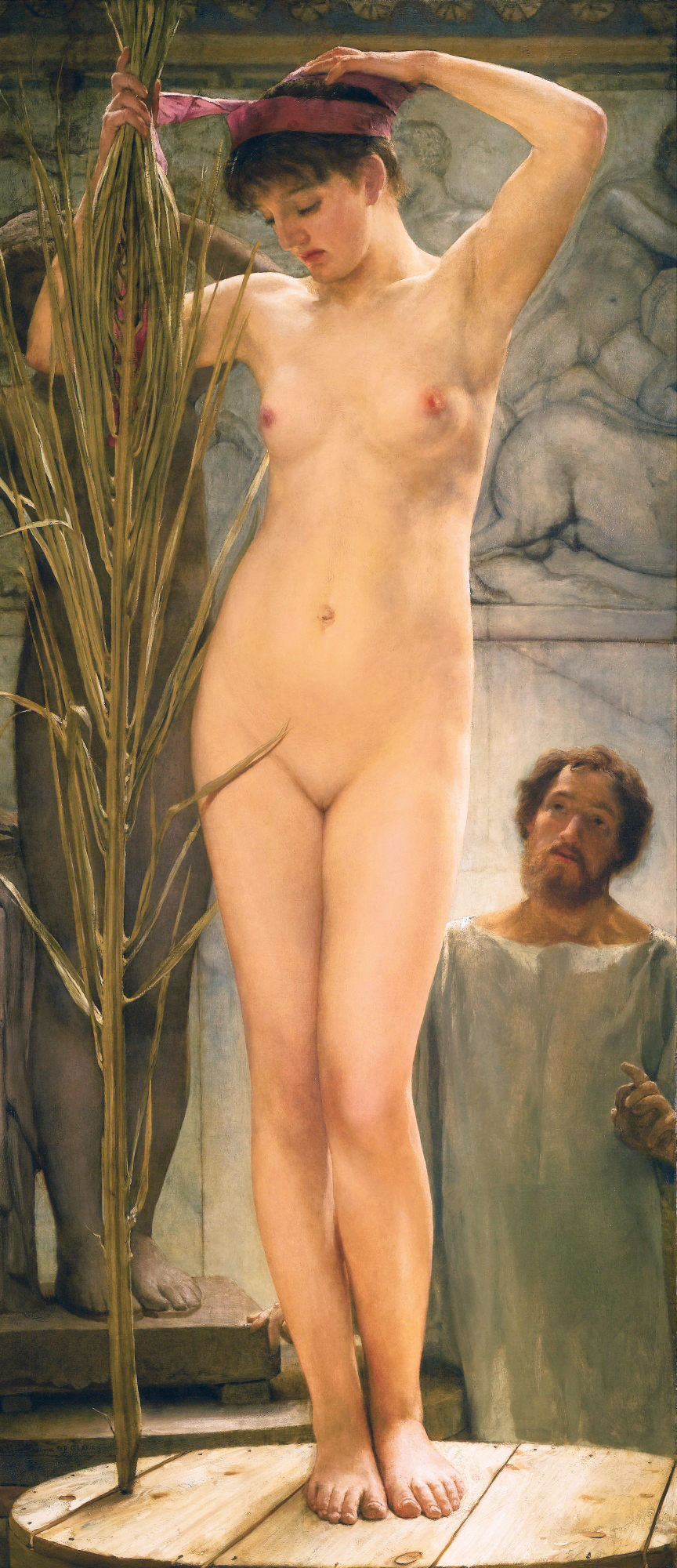
- Artist: Lawrence Alma-Tadema
- Year: 1877
- Type: Oil on canvas, history painting
- Dimensions: 195 cm × 86 cm (77 in × 34 in)
- Location: Private collection

A Sculptor's Model is an oil painting by the Dutch artist Lawrence Alma-Tadema, from 1877. It is held in a private collection.

Blending nude art and history painting it depicts a scene from Ancient Rome, a major focus of the artist's work. A naked art model poses for a statue, tying her hair in preparation. The female figure resembles the Esquiline Venus which had been excavated in 1874 on the Esquiline Hill. The painting depicts the sculpting of the Venus, which is obscured by a palm branch held by the model.

The painting was displayed at the Royal Academy Exhibition of 1878 at Burlington House in London. Its full-length, life-size depicting of a nude female, without any mythological element, caused a degree of controversy despite the artist's use of a classical prototype.

== Bibliography ==
- Barrow, Rosemary J. Lawrence Alma-Tadema. Phaidon Press, 2001.
- Hardie, Philip R. Ovid's Poetics of Illusion. Cambridge University Press, 2002.
- Liversidge, Michael & Edwards, Catherine. Imagining Rome British Artists and Rome in the Nineteenth Century. Merrell Holberton, 1996.
- Smith, Alison. The Victorian Nude: Sexuality, Morality, and Art. Manchester University Press, 1996.
