= Pasiteles =

1st century BC Greco-Roman Neo-Attic school sculptor

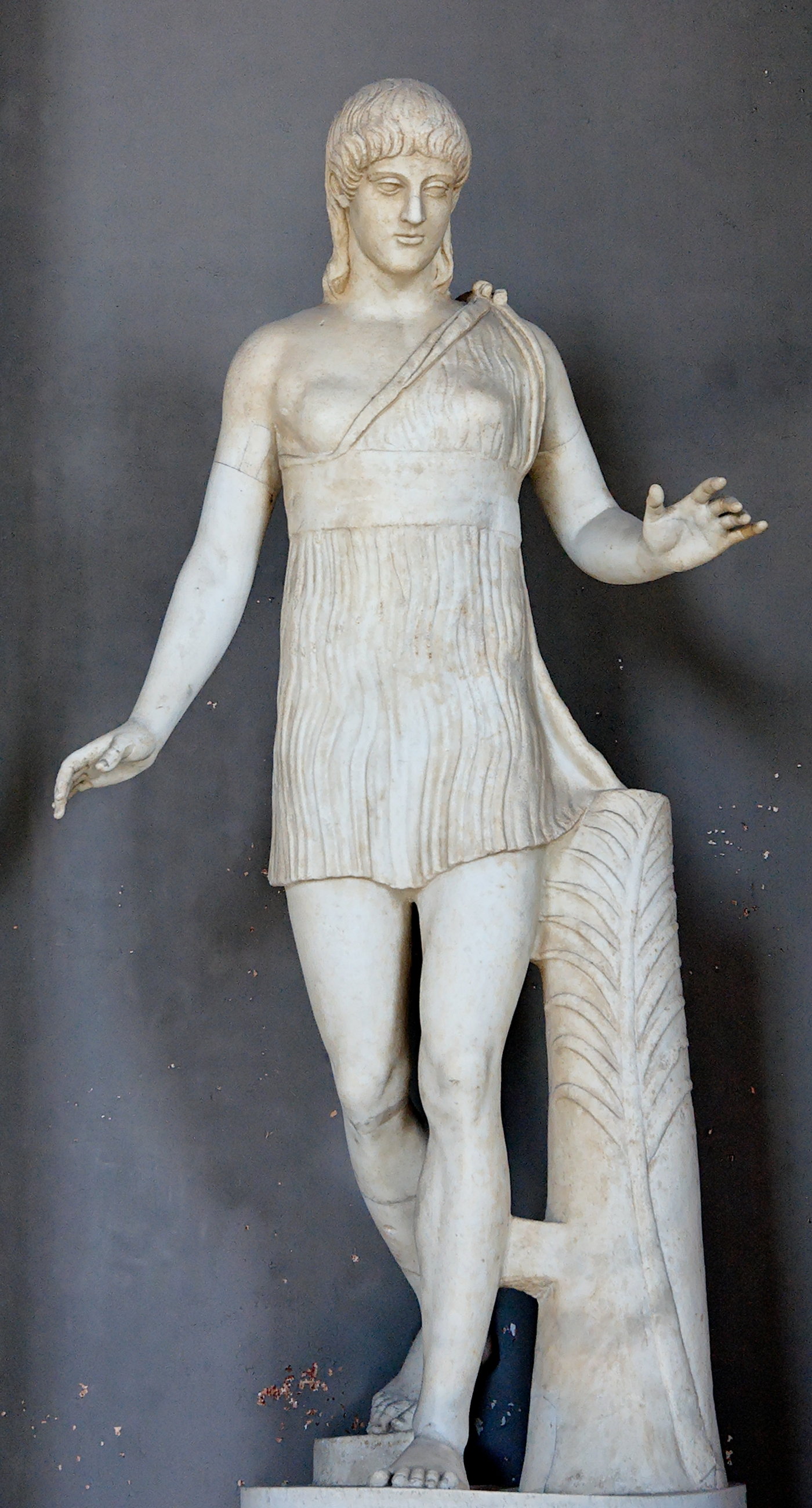
So-called "Atalanta": statue of a young girl; the palm branch on the trunk is a symbol of victory. Marble, Greek artwork, 1st century BC (Vatican Inv. 2784)

Pasiteles (Ancient Greek: Πασιτέλης; sometimes called Pasiteles the Younger) was a Neo-Attic school sculptor from Ancient Rome at the time of Julius Caesar. Pasiteles is said by Pliny to have been a native of Magna Graecia, and to have been granted Roman citizenship. He worked during a period where there was a demand for copies of, or variations on, noted works of Greek sculpture; the demand was met by the workshops of Pasiteles and his pupils Stephanus and Menelaus and others, several of whose statues are extant. According to Pliny, Pasiteles made an ivory statue of Jupiter for the temple of Metellus and made statues for the temple of Juno in the portico of Octavia.

Pliny states that Pasiteles worked in marble, silver, ivory, and bronze and, according to his contemporary Varro, never made a statue without first making a clay model. Pasiteles was the author of five books upon celebrated works of sculpture and chasing in the whole world (quinque volumina nobilium operum in toto), which Pliny calls mirabilia opera, stating that Pasiteles is a better guide to chased silver than Xenocrates or the other authorities. In Pliny there is some alternation of the spelling "Paxiteles" with the spelling "Pasiteles."

== Pasiteles the Elder ==
According to Pausanias i 30 §2, Pasiteles, in the time of Pheidias, was the teacher of the sculptor Colotes.
