= Commodus as Hercules =

Marble portrait sculpture

Bust of Commodus
- Bust of Commodus as Hercules
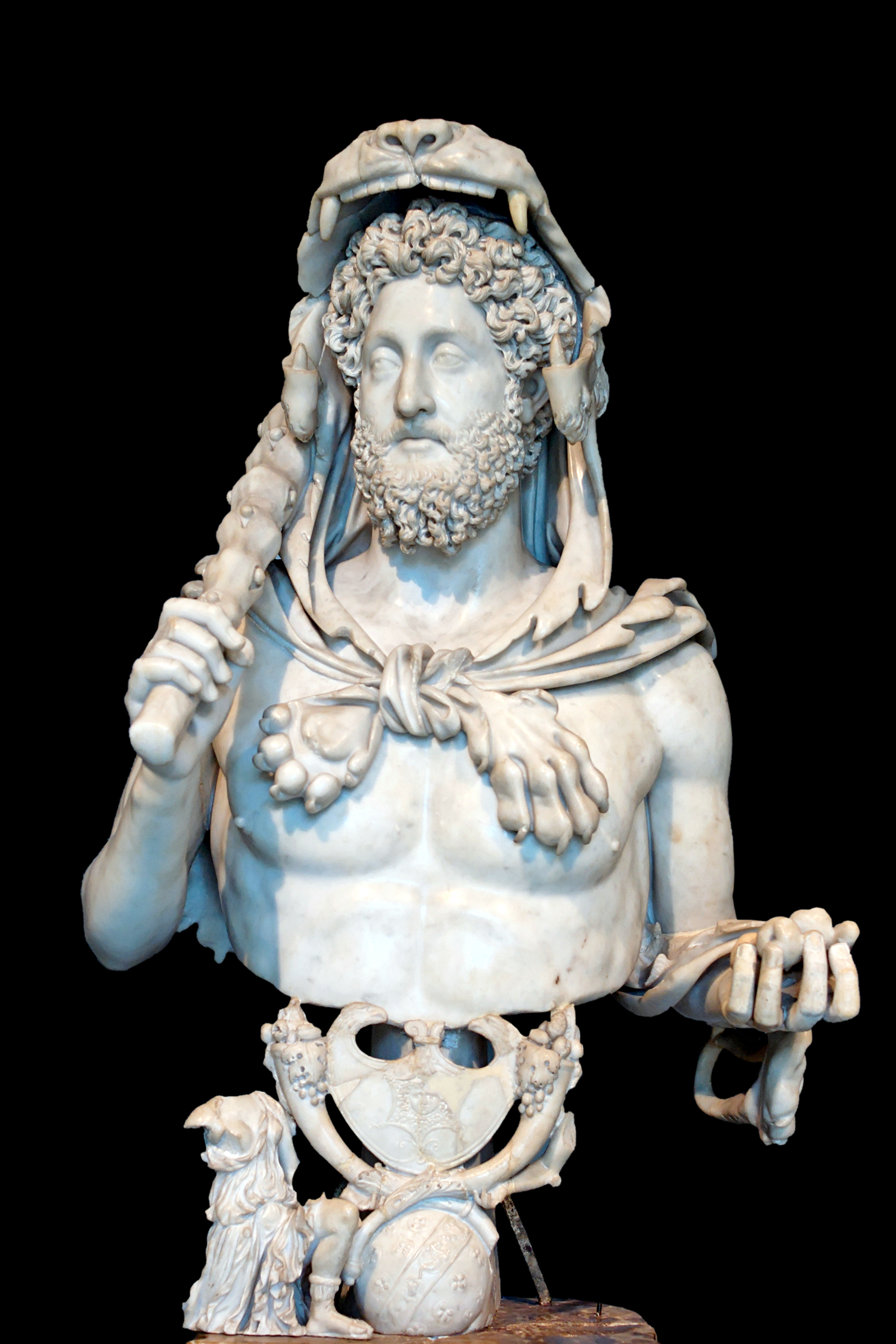
- Year: 192 AD
- Type: Sculpture
- Medium: Marble
- Subject: Commodus
- Dimensions: 133 cm (52 in)
- Condition: Well-preserved
- Location: Capitoline Museums; Rome; 41°53′35″N 12°28′57″E
- Owner: Capitoline Museums
- Accession: MC1120

Commodus as Hercules, also known as The Bust of Commodus as Hercules, is a marble portrait sculpture created sometime in early 192 AD. It is housed in the Capitoline Museums in Rome, Italy. Originally discovered in 1874 in the underground chambers of Horti Lamiani, it has become one of the most famous examples of Roman portraiture to date.

Commodus (31 August 161 AD – 31 December 192 AD) was Roman emperor from 180 to 192 and the son of the previous emperor, Marcus Aurelius. During his sole reign, he came to associate himself with the Greek hero Herakles (whose myths were adopted in Rome under the name Hercules), eventually having a bust depicting him as the hero created near the end of his reign.

== Symbolism ==
Here, the Roman Emperor has taken on the guise of the mythological hero, Hercules. He has been given the attributes of the hero: the skin of the Nemean lion placed over his head and his left arm, the club in his right hand, and the three golden apples of the Hesperides in his left hand. Each of these objects has been placed as a reminder of the hero's accomplishments, as well as allowing the Emperor to associate and refer to himself as the Roman Hercules.

At the base of the sculpture, carved into the globe are the zodiacal signs of Taurus, Capricorn, and Scorpio. The meaning behind these symbols has been somewhat debated since the discovery of the sculpture, with interpretations ranging from purely astrological to calendric.

Evidence pointing towards the latter of these two ideas has been presented by Professor Robert Hannah of The University of Waikato, who suggested that these signs could represent the month of October, which the emperor had renamed after Hercules during his rule:

In this way, the signs are interpreted as an indication of the month of October. October figured prominently at various stages of Commodus' life, and indeed was renamed after Hercules by the Emperor. This calendric interpretation can therefore be seen to emphasize the Herculean aspect of the portrait.

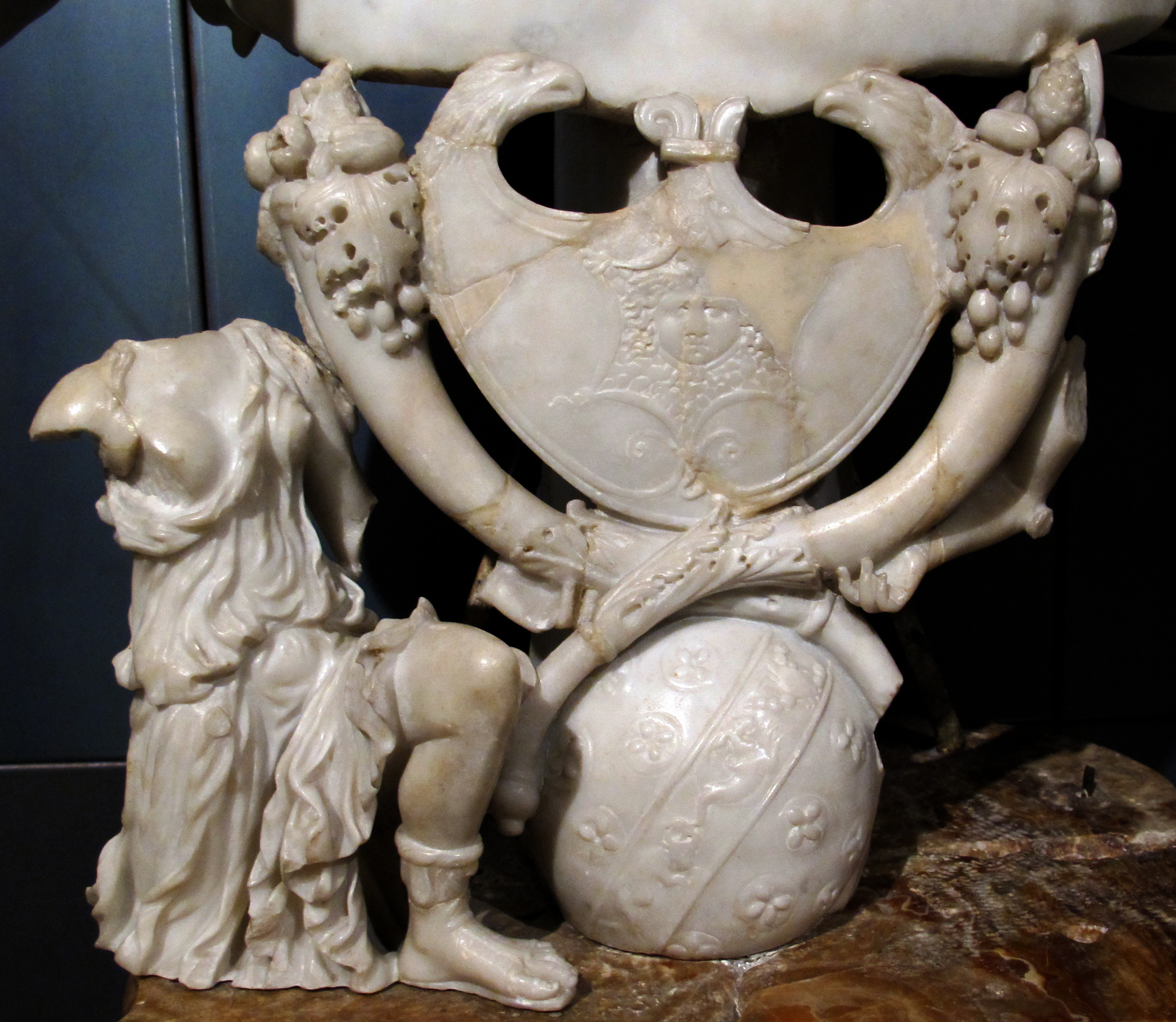
Base of the bust, which includes the globe and zodiacal symbols. The now single Amazon figure, cornucopia, and pelta can also be seen.

Other sources argue that the three signs instead are linked to the foundations of the city of Rome. In this case, Taurus refers the founding of Rome under Romulus, which took place traditionally on feast of the Parilia, the 21st of April; Capricorn represents Augustus, who regarded the sign as his; and finally Scorpio is the emperor himself, as the third "founder" of the city. This popular theory also can be seen as Commodus once more emphasizing his association with Hercules, as Scorpio falls in the month of October, which he had renamed after Hercules.

Further decoration can be found surrounding the globe, from the kneeling Amazons to either side (one of whom has been lost), to the cornucopia entangled with a pelta. The pelta is decorated with eagles' heads and a Gorgoneion as symbols of the god Jupiter, the father of Hercules and tutelary god of Commodus. Believed to be for the purpose of celebration, this idea is furthered by the inclusion of two Tritons, which are believed to represent his apotheosis. Traces of gold on the two Triton figures suggest that the bust of Commodus was as well at least partially gilded.

== Intent ==
There is speculation about the Emperor's intent in creating depictions of himself as a godlike figure. Some sources say it was Commodus's desire to be not merely the protégé of Hercules, but a god, the incarnation, the epiphany of Hercules. Others claim instead that he simply desired to be the center of attention and show his intense appreciation for games and spectacles.

Archaeologist and museum director Mortimer Wheeler suggested that although the bust would have been made for Commodus or someone close to him at the court, and the mythological topic decided by the patron, the artist was deliberately subverting the flattering subject and casting the flamboyant emperor in an ironic light: the contrast between the trappings of Hercules, the real hero (lion hide and club, etc.), and the "effeminate" and self-obsessed emperor shown in stone here is too grotesque to be taken only as an idolizing portrait, and the hidden intention becomes ironic. "The sculptor must have felt very sure of his ground, protected by the blind vanity of his sitter".
