= Gaius Sentius Saturninus (consul 4) =

Gaius Sentius Saturninus was a Roman senator, and consul ordinarius for AD 4 as the colleague of Sextus Aelius Catus. He was the middle son of Gaius Sentius Saturninus, consul in 19 BC. During his consulate the Lex Aelia Sentia, concerning the manumission of slaves, was published.

Saturninus, with his brothers Gnaeus Sentius Saturninus, suffect consul in AD 4, and Lucius Sentius Saturninus, accompanied their father when he assumed the governorship of Syria in the years 9 through 7 BC, serving as his legati or assistants.

Political offices
Preceded by Publius Silius, and Lucius Volusius Saturninus as consules suffecti	Consul of the Roman Empire; AD 4 with Sextus Aelius Catus	Succeeded by Gnaeus Sentius Saturninus, and Gaius Clodius Licinus as consules suffecti
