= Lucius Aelius Lamia (consul 3) =

Roman Senator who held a number of offices under Augustus and Tiberius

Lucius Aelius Lamia (before 43 BC – AD 33) was a Roman senator who held a number of offices under Augustus and Tiberius. He was consul in the year AD 3 with Marcus Servilius as his colleague.

Lucius was the son of Lucius Aelius Lamia, a loyal partisan of Cicero who was made praetor in 43 BC but died before completing his term. His connection with the prominent Aelii Tuberones (including Aelia Paetina, second wife of the emperor Claudius) is not known. It is unlikely his father was the same man as Lucius Aelius Tubero, the possible great-grandfather of Aelia Paetina.

== Career ==
Only one of his offices before acceding to the consulate is known: Lucius was tresviri monetalis, the most prestigious of the four boards that form the vigintiviri, in 9 BC together with Publius Silius. After he stepped down from the consulate, Lucius served as legatus propraetor or governor of Germania, then Pannonia. Towards the beginning of Tiberius' reign the sortition awarded Lucius the proconsulship of Africa (between AD 14 and 17). An inscription recovered from a crossroads near Leptis Magna in Tunisia records that Lucius constructed 44 miles of road from that town to the edge of its territory at "the order of Tiberius Caesar Augustus".

In 22 AD he was appointed imperial legate to Syria by Tiberius but was detained in Rome and never traveled to Syria in person. In the last year of his life, 33 AD, Lucius Aelius Lamia served as praefectus urbi.

== Notes ==
Political offices
Preceded by Publius Cornelius Lentulus Scipio, and Titus Quinctius Crispinus Valerianus as Suffect consuls	Consul of the Roman Empire; AD 3 with Marcus Servilius	Succeeded by Publius Silius, and Lucius Volusius Saturninus as Suffect consuls
