= Gnaeus Sentius Saturninus =

Gnaeus Sentius Saturninus was the name of two Roman senators, father and son.

- The elder Gnaeus Sentius Saturninus was one of three sons of Gaius Sentius Saturninus, who was imperial legate to Syria from 9 to 6 BC. He was suffect consul in 4 AD, the same year his older brother, Gaius Sentius Saturninus, was consul ordinarius. In 19 AD he replaced Gnaeus Calpurnius Piso as governor of Syria, whom he compelled to return to Rome to stand trial for the murder of Germanicus Caesar.
- The younger Gnaeus Sentius Saturninus was consul in 41 AD alongside the emperor Caligula. When Caligula was murdered that same year Saturninus made a speech in the Senate welcoming the return of liberty and urging his fellow senators to preserve it. His ring, which bore Caligula's image, was removed and broken by a fellow senator, Trebellius Maximus. Claudius had already been named as the new emperor, but Sentius and another senator, Pomponius Secundus, were prepared to oppose him, by force if necessary, to restore senatorial rule. The army, for their part, supported Claudius and were prepared to use force against the Senate, but Claudius met the rebellious senators and won them over. Eutropius named Sentius as one of the commanders involved in the Roman conquest of Britain two years later.
