= Alfena gens =

Ancient Roman family

The gens Alfena or Alfenia was a Roman family, known from the first century BC to the first century AD. The gens is known chiefly from five individuals, three of whom attained the consulship. Three shared the cognomen Varus, and may have been closely related.

== Members ==
- (Publius) Alfenus Varus, a jurist and pupil of Servius Sulpicius Rufus.
- Publius Alfenius Varus, perhaps the son of the jurist, consul in AD 2.
- Alfenus or Alfenius Varus, perhaps a descendant of the jurist, a general in the service of Aulus Vitellius in AD 69.
- Lucius Alfenus Senecio, consul and Roman governor of Britain in the early third century.
- Lucius Alfenus Avitianus, consul suffectus in an uncertain year around AD 210–220; he was a member of the Arval brethren, and served as governor of Arabia Petraea during the reign of Caracalla.

== See also ==
- List of Roman gentes
