= Ancharius =

Ancharius is the nomen of the Roman gens Ancharia. It may refer to various members of that family.

Ancharius may also refer to a genus of catfish native to the island of Madagascar, including the following species:

- Ancharius brevibarbis
- Ancharius fuscus
- Ancharius griseus
