= Appuleia gens =

Ancient Roman family

The gens Appuleia, occasionally written Apuleia, was a plebeian family at ancient Rome, which flourished from the fifth century BC into imperial times. The first of the gens to achieve importance was Lucius Appuleius, tribune of the plebs in 391 BC.

== Praenomina ==
The principal names used by the Appuleii were Lucius, Sextus, and Gaius. There is one early instance of the praenomen Quintus, but Marcus and Gnaeus are not found before the first century BC.

== Branches and cognomina ==
The cognomina of this gens are Decianus, Pansa, and Saturninus. Of these, only Saturninus was a regular surname. Decianus was first used by a member adopted from the Decia gens, and passed to his children.

== Members ==
This list includes abbreviated praenomina. For an explanation of this practice, see filiation.

- Lucius Appuleius, tribune of the plebs in 391 BC, impeached Camillus for having secreted part of the spoils of Veii.
- Quintus Appuleius Pansa, consul in 300 BC.
- Lucius Appuleius, one of the Roman ambassadors sent in 156 BC to examine the state of affairs between Attalus and Prusias.
- Marcus Appuleius M. f., a senator in 129 BC.
- Lucius Appuleius, praetor in 59 BC, and governor of Macedonia in 58.
- Appuleius, proquaestor, perhaps of Quintus Marcius Philippus, proconsul in Asia in 55 BC.
- Appuleius, a praediator mentioned by Cicero in two of his letters.
- Marcus Appuleius, quaestor in Asia at the time of Caesar's death in 44 BC, proscribed by the triumvirs, but afterward restored to his native country.
- Appuleius, probably tribune of the plebs, was proscribed by the triumvirs in 43 BC, and escaped with his wife to Sicily.
- Sextus Appuleius Sex. f., married to Octavia the Elder, the half-sister of Augustus.
- Sextus Appuleius Sex. f. Sex. n., consul in 29 BC, was a nephew of Augustus.
- Marcus Appuleius Sex. f. Sex. n., consul in 20 BC, was another nephew of Augustus.
- Sextus Appuleius Sex. f. Sex. n., consul in AD 14, was a grandnephew of Augustus, who died during his consulship.
- Appuleia Sex. f. Sex. n. Varilla, daughter of the consul of 29 BC.
- Publius Appuleius Sex. f. Sex. n. Varus, a son of Sextus Appuleius, consul in 29 BC.
- Appuleius Celsus, a physician from Centuripa in Sicilia, who was the tutor of Valens and Scribonius Largus.
- Lucius Appuleius or Apuleius, the author of a Metamorphoses, better known as The Golden Ass.
- Lucius Appuleius Barbarus, a botanical writer, probably dating to the fourth century.

=== Appuleii Saturnini ===
- Gaius Appuleius Saturninus, one of the commissioners sent by the Senate in 168 BC to inquire into and settle the disputes between the Pisani and Lunenses.
- Lucius Appuleius Saturninus, praetor in 166 BC.
- Lucius Appuleius Saturninus, tribune of the plebs in 103 and 100 BC.
- Lucius Appuleius Saturninus, propraetorian governor of Macedonia in 58 BC.
- Appuleia, mother of Lepidus the Triumvir.

=== Appuleii Deciani ===
- Gaius Appuleius Decianus, tribune of the plebs in 98 BC.
- Gaius Appuleius C. f. Decianus, a negotiator at Pergamon and Apollonis in Asia Minor.

=== Others ===
- Pseudo-Apuleius, a fourth century writer, also known as Appuleius Barbarus or Appuleius Platonicus.
- Lucius Caecilicus Minutianus Appuleius, a tenth century writer.

== See also ==
- List of Roman gentes

== Bibliography ==
- Polybius, Historiae (The Histories).
- Marcus Tullius Cicero, Epistulae ad Atticum, Epistulae ad Familiares.
- Titus Livius (Livy), History of Rome.
- Scribonius Largus, De Compositione Medicamentorum (On the Composition of Medicines).
- Lucius Mestrius Plutarchus (Plutarch), Lives of the Noble Greeks and Romans.
- Appianus Alexandrinus (Appian), Bellum Civile (The Civil War).
- Cassius Dio, Roman History.
- Dictionary of Greek and Roman Biography and Mythology, William Smith, ed., Little, Brown and Company, Boston (1849).
- T. Robert S. Broughton, The Magistrates of the Roman Republic, American Philological Association (1952–1986).
- Syme, Ronald (1964). "Senators, Tribes and Towns". Historia. 13 (1): 105–125. JSTOR 4434822.
- Robert K. Sherk, "The Text of the Senatus Consultum De Agro Pergameno", in Greek, Roman, and Byzantine Studies, vol. 7, pp. 361–369 (1966).
- Ronald Syme, The Augustan Aristocracy, Clarendon Press, Oxford (1989).
