= Sentia gens =

Ancient Roman family

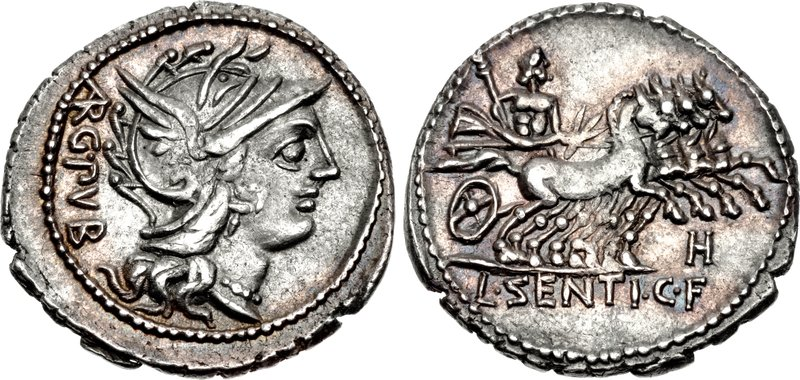
Denarius of Lucius Sentius, 101 BC. On the obverse is the head of Roma, while the reverse depicts Jupiter driving a quadriga.

The gens Sentia was a plebeian family at ancient Rome. Members of this gens are first mentioned in history toward the end of the Republic. The first of the Sentii to obtain the consulship was Gaius Sentius Saturninus, in 19 BC.

== Origin ==
The origin of the nomen Sentius is uncertain, but it might be derived from the Latin sentus, thorny. Chase classifies it among those gentilicia that either originated at Rome, or cannot be shown to have come from anywhere else. Syme prefers an Etruscan origin, noting that the name seems abundant at Clusium. However, the Sentii Saturnini of the late Republic were from Atina in southern Latium.

== Praenomina ==
The main praenomina used by the Sentii were Gaius, Gnaeus, and Lucius, all of which were very common throughout Roman history. Other names attested from inscriptions include Quintus and Sextus.

== Branches and cognomina ==
The most important family of the Sentii bore the cognomen Saturninus, which occurs on coins. Other coins of this gens include no surnames. One of the more noteworthy Sentii of imperial times bore the surname Augurinus, an occupational cognomen probably indicating that he or one of his ancestors was an augur.

== Members ==
This list includes abbreviated praenomina. For an explanation of this practice, see filiation.

=== Sentii Saturnini ===
- Gaius Sentius C. f., praetor urbanus in 94 BC, and governor of Macedonia from 93 to 87. He repelled an invasion of the Thracians under Sothinus, but was later driven back by Ariathes and Taxiles.
- Lucius Sentius C. f., triumvir monetalis probably between 105 and 100 BC, was praetor in an uncertain year, between 93 and 89.
- Gaius Sentius C. f. C. n. Saturninus, the father of Vetulo.
- Gnaeus (Sentius C. f. C. n.) Saturninus, (Note: Klebs, following earlier authorities, identifies him as Lucius Appuleius Saturninus, and confounds him with his son.) served probably as quaestor or legate under Quintus Caecilius Metellus in Crete in 68 or 67 BC.
- Gnaeus Sentius Cn. f. C. n. Saturninus, a young man addicted to luxury and privilege.
- Sentia C. f. C. n., married Lucius Scribonius Libo, praetor urbanus in 80 BC, and was the mother of Scribonia, the wife of Augustus, and Lucius Scribonius Libo, consul in 34 BC.
- Gaius Sentius C. f. C. n. Saturninus Vetulo, one of those proscribed by the triumvirs in 43 BC, escaped death by assuming the insignia of a praetor, and marching to Puteoli, where he boarded a ship for Sicily, and joined Sexus Pompeius. He went over to Octavian in 35.
- Gaius Sentius C. f. C. n. Saturninus, supposed by some scholars to be the same as Vetulo, but more probably his son, was consul in 19 BC, and afterward governor of Africa and Syria. He was governor of Germania from around AD 3 to 6, and distinguished himself in the campaigns of Tiberius, for which he was awarded the triumphal ornaments.
- Gaius Sentius C. f. C. n. Saturninus, consul in AD 4, the year in which the lex Aelia Sentia was passed.
- Gnaeus Sentius C. f. C. n. Saturninus, consul suffectus in AD 4, was appointed governor of Syria in AD 19, and was forced to eject Gnaeus Calpurnius Piso, the preceding governor, who refused to vacate his office.
- Lucius Sentius C. f. C. n. Saturninus, the third son of Gaius Sentius Saturninus, attended the trial of Herod's sons in 6 BC, along with his father and brothers, Gaius and Gnaeus.
- Gnaeus Sentius Cn. f. C. n. Saturninus, consul in AD 41, with the emperor Caligula, whose behaviour he denounced in a long speech before the senate following the emperor's assassination.
- Gnaeus Sentius Cn. f. Saturninus, a native of Atina, was a scout serving in the eighth cohort of the Praetorian Guard, in the century of Severus. He was buried in a first century tomb at Rome, aged twenty-seven, having served for eight years.
- Lucius Sentius L. f. Saturninus, a native of Mediolanum in Cisalpine Gaul, was a scout serving in the century of Lucius Cornelius Viator. He was buried at Rome, aged thirty-three, having served for thirteen years.
- Gaius Sentius Saturninus, a veteran of the fourth legion, built a tomb at Stobi in Macedonia for himself, his wife, Gavia Julia, their son, Gaius Sentius Saturninus, and Sentia, the freedwoman of Zosimus.
- Gaius Sentius C. f. Saturninus, the son of Gaius Sentius Saturninus and Gavia Julia, was a soldier in the fourth cohort of the Praetorian Guard. He was buried at Stobi in a tomb built by his father.
- Sentia, the freedwoman of Zosimus, buried in a family sepulchre built at Stobi by Gaius Sentius Saturninus.
- Sentia Saturnina, dedicated a tomb at Comum in Cisalpine Gaul to her husband, Gaius Catius Secundus.
- Sentia Saturnina, buried at Naraggara in Africa Proconsularis, aged sixty-five, along with Decimus Gargilius Gargilianus, aged sixty-eight.
- Quintus Sentius Saturninus, a man of equestrian rank, buried in an ornate tomb at Iufi in Africa Proconsularis.

=== Others ===
- Sentius Potitus, mentioned in a rescript of uncertain date.
- Sentius, denounced and put to death during the reign of Nero. The senator Helvidius Priscus recalled him as one of the friends of Vespasian who had been destroyed by the delatores, along with Publius Clodius Thrasea Paetus and Quintus Marcius Barea Soranus.
- Sextus Sentius Sex. f. Caecilianus, consul in AD 75 or 76, after a distinguished career, in which he had been decemvir stlitibus judicandis, military tribune with the eighth legion, plebeian aedile, praetor, governor of a senatorial province, legate of the fifteenth and third legions, and governor of Mauretania Tingitana.
- Sentius Augurinus, a close friend and contemporary of Pliny the Younger, who described him as a skillful and eminent poet. He wrote short works in the style of Catullus and Gaius Licinius Macer Calvus. He might be the same person as the Quintus Gellius Sentius Augurinus, governor of Macedonia under Hadrian.
- Sentius, a centurion who was sent as an envoy to Mebarsapes during Trajan's Parthian War, in AD 116. Mebarsapes imprisoned him at Adenystrae, but when Roman forces approached the city, Sentius led his fellow prisoners in a revolt, killing the Parthian commander, and opening the gates to the Romans.
- Gnaeus Sentius Aburnianus, consul suffectus in AD 123.
- Gaius Sentius Severus Quadratus, a man of senatorial rank, and an official of the imperial court at an uncertain period.
- Sentia Sabina, (Note: Savina in the inscription.) a Roman matron from a senatorial family, named in an inscription from the late third or early fourth century.
- Quintus Sentius Fabricius Julianus, twice proconsul of Africa, the second time from AD 412 to 414.

== See also ==
- List of Roman gentes

== Bibliography ==
- Marcus Tullius Cicero, In Pisonem, In Verrem, Pro Plancio.
- Titus Livius (Livy), History of Rome.
- Marcus Velleius Paterculus, Compendium of Roman History.
- Valerius Maximus, Factorum ac Dictorum Memorabilium (Memorable Facts and Sayings).
- Flavius Josephus, Antiquitates Judaïcae (Antiquities of the Jews); Bellum Judaïcum (The Jewish War).
- Sextus Julius Frontinus, De Aquaeductu (On Aqueducts).
- Publius Cornelius Tacitus, Annales.
- Gaius Plinius Caecilius Secundus (Pliny the Younger), Epistulae (Letters).
- Lucius Mestrius Plutarchus (Plutarch), Lives of the Noble Greeks and Romans.
- Appianus Alexandrinus (Appian), Bella Mithridatica (The Mithridatic Wars), Bellum Civile (The Civil War).
- Lucius Cassius Dio Cocceianus (Cassius Dio), Roman History.
- Paulus Orosius, Historiarum Adversum Paganos (History Against the Pagans).
- Joseph Hilarius Eckhel, Doctrina Numorum Veterum (The Study of Ancient Coins, 1792–1798).
- Dictionary of Greek and Roman Biography and Mythology, William Smith, ed., Little, Brown and Company, Boston (1849).
- Theodor Mommsen et alii, Corpus Inscriptionum Latinarum (The Body of Latin Inscriptions, abbreviated CIL), Berlin-Brandenburgische Akademie der Wissenschaften (1853–present).
- René Cagnat et alii, L'Année épigraphique (The Year in Epigraphy, abbreviated AE), Presses Universitaires de France (1888–present).
- George Davis Chase, "The Origin of Roman Praenomina", in Harvard Studies in Classical Philology, vol. VIII, pp. 103–184 (1897).
- Paul von Rohden, Elimar Klebs, & Hermann Dessau, Prosopographia Imperii Romani (The Prosopography of the Roman Empire, abbreviated PIR), Berlin (1898).
- T. Robert S. Broughton, The Magistrates of the Roman Republic, American Philological Association (1952–1986).
- Ronald Syme, "The Stemma of the Sentii Saturnini", in Historia: Zeitschrift für Alte Geschichte, vol. 13, part 2, pp. 156–166 (April, 1964).
- Jones, A.H.M.; J.R. Martindale & J. Morris (1971–1992). Prosopography of the Later Roman Empire. Cambridge University Press. ISBN 0-521-07233-6.
- Michael Crawford, Roman Republican Coinage, Cambridge University Press (1974–2001).
- Paul A. Gallivan, "The Fasti for A.D. 70–96", in Classical Quarterly, vol. 31, pp. 186–220 (1981).
- J.E.H. Spaul, "Governors of Tingitana", in Antiquités Africains, vol. 30, pp. 235–260 (1994).
- Werner Eck and Andreas Pangerl, "Neue Diplome mit den Namen von Konsuln und Statthaltern", in Zeitschrift für Papyrologie und Epigraphik, vol. 187, pp. 273–294 (2013).
