= Gaius Furnius (consul) =

Gaius Furnius was a Roman senator during the reign of Augustus, and consul in 17 BC with Gaius Junius Silanus as his colleague.

He was the son of Gaius Furnius, who had been a staunch adherent of Marcus Antonius until 31 BC. The younger Furnius successfully reconciled his father and Octavian, and the elder Furnius became consul designatus in 29 BC. Tacitus reported that a certain Furnius was put to death in the reign of Tiberius, AD 26, for adultery with Claudia Pulchra, but it is doubtful whether he was the same person.

== See also ==
- Furnia (gens)

Political offices
Preceded by Publius Cornelius Lentulus Marcellinus, and Gnaeus Cornelius Lentulus	Consul of the Roman Empire; 17 BC with Gaius Junius Silanus	Succeeded by Lucius Domitius Ahenobarbus, and Publius Cornelius Scipio
