= Erycina =

Erycina may refer to:

- Erycina (bivalve), a genus in the family Lasaeidae
- Erycina (plant), a flowering plant genus in the family Orchidaceae
- Venus Erycina ("Venus of Eryx"), a name for the Roman goddess Venus

== See also ==
- Erycinae, a subfamily of snakes
- Temple of Venus Erycina (Capitoline Hill)
- Temple of Venus Erycina (Quirinal Hill)
