= Appuleius =

Appuleius is the nomen of the Roman gens Appuleia. It may refer to various members of that family, including:

- Lucius Appuleius Saturninus, tribune of the plebs in 100 B.C.
- Lucius Caecilicus Minutianus Appuleius, ancient Roman writer on grammar
- Any of several individuals named Sextus Appuleius.
- Lucius Appuleius, author of The Golden Ass.

For other persons named Appuleius, see Appuleia (gens).

== See also ==
- Gens
- List of Roman gentes
