= Marcus Considius Nonianus =

1st century BCE Roman Praetor

Marcus Considius Nonianus was a praetor in the late Roman Republic, holding the office around 55–50 BC. In 49 BC, as civil war was breaking out, the Roman Senate assigned him as propraetor to succeed Julius Caesar in the province of Cisalpine Gaul. He served in Campania.

A denarius, notable for its unique depiction of Venus Erycina, was minted by his contemporary C. Considius Longus (or Paetus) but is sometimes misattributed to him.

== See also ==
- Considia gens

== Sources ==
- Cicero, Pro Sestio 113–114; In Vatinium 38; Ad Atticum 8.11B.2; Ad familiares 16.12.3
- Bobbio Scholiast 135 Stangl
- T.R.S. Broughton, The Magistrates of the Roman Republic, vol. 2, 99 B.C.–31 B.C. (New York: American Philological Association, 1952), pp. 222, 261, 549.
