= Gaius Appuleius Decianus =

Tribune of the plebs in 98 BC

Gaius Appuleius Decianus was tribune of the plebs in 98 BC, known primarily for his connection to politically motivated prosecutions in the Late Roman Republic.

== The case against P. Furius ==
Decianus attempted to prosecute Publius Furius (tribune in 100 or 99 BC), but according to Cicero, lost the case because he expressed sorrow over the killing of the radical tribune Lucius Appuleius Saturninus. Decianus's commitment to popularist politics is well-established and consistent. His father was the Publius Decius (praetor 115 BC) who prosecuted Lucius Opimius for the murder of the popularist leader Gaius Gracchus. The formation of the name Appuleius Decianus indicates that he was adopted by a member of the gens Appuleia and perhaps even by Saturninus himself. "Tumultuous efforts" were made during the tribunate of Decianus to avenge the deaths of Saturninus and Servilius Glaucia.

The trial of Furius was politically motivated; no actual charge is even recorded, but may have been ambitus (election irregularities). Furius had originally supported Saturninus, but ultimately broke with him as did the majority of the tax-collecting equestrian order who rejected his plebs-friendly policies. Growing opposition to Saturninus had compelled Gaius Marius to renounce him, resulting in his proscription and death. Furius had proposed a number of post-mortem penalties, such as the confiscation of his property, the destruction of his house, and the rescinding of some of his legislation. The social conflicts that culminated in Saturninus's death continued to play out in the law courts during the 90s. Decianus brought the case against Furius in retaliation, and chose to present it for the judgment of the people (iudicium populi) rather than in the court for which equites acted as judges.

Furius was acquitted. Appian says that C. Canuleius was the tribune who prosecuted Furius; this may be a textual error, an additional prosecutor, or a reference to a second trial. A mob, however, took their own revenge on Furius, attacking him and tearing his body to pieces.

== The case against L. Valerius Flaccus ==
Decianus also prosecuted Lucius Valerius Flaccus (suffect consul 86 BC), who had just completed his term as curule aedile in 99 BC. Revenge again may be a factor, but less clearly so. Lucius's older cousin of the same name had been consular colleague in 100 BC when Marius turned against Saturninus. During the 90s and into the mid-80s, the Valerii Flacci tended to be moderate in their political tactics while supporting the popularist Marian-Cinnan faction. Decianus appears to have been unsuccessful in this prosecution as well; Flaccus's career shows no signs of having been hampered.

== Tried and convicted ==
The political ineffectuality of Decianus was underscored when he himself was brought to trial after his term ended. The charges remain unspecified in the historical record, but he is most likely to have been brought before the new maiestas tribunal for which members of the equestrian order served as judges. The Bobbio Scholiast notes that Decianus was condemned for his "seditious and tumultuous tribunate," to which may be compared similar remarks by Cicero on Sextus Titius, a tribune the same year as Furius. Decianus's sorrow at the death of Saturninus was used against him, as was the possession by Titius of a bust of the demagogue; these signs of attachment to a public enemy even after his death were construed as treasonous.

After his trial, Decianus fled to Asia and sought refuge with Mithridates VI of Pontus prior to the First Mithridatic War. Although exile and flight was the customary response to condemnation, Decianus took the unusual measure of bringing his young son with him, indicating that he had no intention of trying to regain his place in Roman society.

== Gaius Appuleius C. f. Decianus ==
Decianus' son, who had the same name, lived in Apollonis but retained his Roman citizenship. Cicero accuses both Deciani of participating in depredations against the free civitas of Apollonis with Mithridates. This younger Decianus served as an advisor to the L. Valerius Flaccus who governed Asia in 62 BC, but he was later one of the prosecutors in the case against Flaccus that is the subject of Cicero's defense speech Pro Flacco.

== Selected primary sources ==
- Marcus Tullius Cicero, Pro Flacco 51, 70ff. (on father and son); Pro Rabirio Perduellionis Reo 24–25.
- Valerius Maximus 8.1.
- Bobbio Scholiast 94–95 in the edition of Stangl (1912).

== Selected bibliography ==
- Gruen, Erich S. "Political Prosecutions in the 90's BC." Historia 15 (1966) 32–64.
- Kelly, Gordon P. A History of Exile in the Roman Republic. Cambridge University Press, 2006, especially pp. 180–181. Limited preview online.
