= Turia =

Turia may refer to:

== Places ==
- Turia (river), a river in southeastern Spain
- Turía (river), a small river in northern Spain
- Turia Valley, a valley in northern Spain
- Turia, Covasna, a commune in Covasna County, Romania
- Turia (Cașin), a river in Romania
- Turia, a village in Valea Mare Commune, Olt County, Romania
- Turiya River, a river in Ukraine
- Turia, the Aromanian name of Kranea, Grevena, a village in Greece

== Other ==
- Tariana Turia (1944–2025), co-leader of New Zealand's Maori Party
- Turia, Thuria or Curia, woman of the Curius family in ancient Rome
- Turia Mau, French model featured on the 1968 Sports Illustrated Swimsuit Issue
- Turia, a genus of molluscs in the family Veneridae
- Turia, a synonym of the plant genus Luffa
- Turia Märzen , a Märzen beer from Valencia, Spain
- Turia, or Curia, long thought to be the woman honored in the Laudatio Turiae

== See also ==
- Turya
