= Temple of Venus =

Temple of Venus may refer to:

- Temple of Venus Genetrix in Rome
- Temple of Venus and Roma in Rome
- Temple of Venus Erycina (Castle of Venus) in Erice
- Temple of Venus Erycina (Capitoline Hill) in Rome
- Temple of Venus Erycina (Quirinal Hill) in Rome
- Temple of Venus Victrix, adjacent to the Theatre of Pompey, Rome
- Temple of Venus (Baalbek), also known as the Circular Temple or St. Barbara's
- The Temple of Venus (film), a 1923 silent film
