= Considia gens =

Ancient Roman family

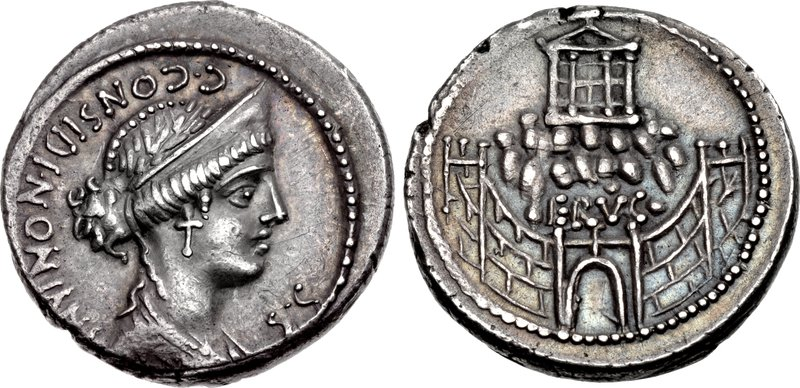
Denarius of Gaius Considius Nonianus, 57 BC. The obverse depicts Venus. The reverse shows the Temple of Venus Erycina on the Quirinal Hill, which was located on the site of the Battle of the Colline Gate. The references to Venus support the claim of Pompeius' partisans that he was the heir of Sulla as the favourite of Venus.

The gens Considia was a plebeian family at ancient Rome. The Considii came to prominence in the last century of the Republic, and under the early Empire, but none of them rose any higher than the praetorship.

== Origin ==
The Considii were an old family, first appearing early in the fifth century BC. However, they quickly faded into obscurity, from which they did not emerge for nearly four centuries. The nomen Considius belongs to a large class of gentilicia formed chiefly from cognomina ending in -idus, using the suffix -idius, which came to be thought of as a regular gentile-forming suffix, and was applied even in cases where there was no morphological justification. Considius might be formed from the nomen of the gens Consia, itself probably related to the mysterious god Consus.

== Praenomina ==
The Considii used the praenomina Quintus, Lucius, Publius, Marcus, and Gaius, all of which were amongst the most common names throughout Roman history.

== Branches and cognomina ==
The main cognomina of the Considii were Gallus, Longus, Nonianus, and Paetus. Gallus may refer to a Gaul, or to a cockerel. Longus implies that the bearer was tall, or perhaps "long-winded", although the name could also have been bestowed ironically on a short man. Nonianus implies a connection with the gens Nonia, although whether the two brothers bearing it were adopted from that family, or descended from it through the maternal line, cannot be determined. Paetus translates as "squinty" or "nearsighted."

== Members ==
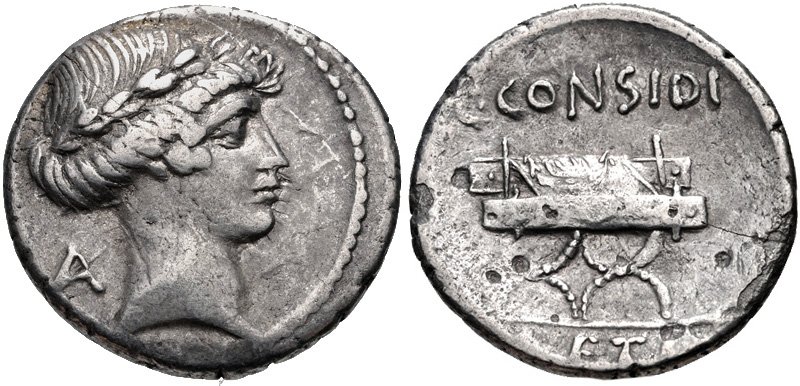
Denarius of Gaius Considius Paetus, 46 BC. The obverse features Apollo. The reverse depicts a curule chair, alluding to the right of Caesar to sit on such a chair between the consuls in the Senate received after the Battle of Thapsus.

This list includes abbreviated praenomina. For an explanation of this practice, see filiation.

- Quintus Considius, tribune of the plebs in 476 BC, brought forward an agrarian law that had previously been rejected, and accused Titus Menenius Lanatus, consul in the preceding year, of neglect resulting in the disaster of the Cremera and destruction of the Fabii.
- Considius, a publicanus, brought an action against Sergius Orata, praetor in 98 BC, for illegally appropriating the waters of the Lucrine Sea.
- Lucius Considius, together with Sextus Saltius, led a colony to Capua at the direction of the tribune Marcus Junius Brutus in 83 BC.
- Quintus Considius, a senator and jurist, was praised by Cicero for his integrity and uprightness. Plutarch records an anecdote concerning his visit to Caesar's house as an old man in 59 BC.
- Quintus Considius, a moneylender at the time of the Catilinian conspiracy in 63 BC, forwent the collection of debts and interest owed him in order to mitigate the alarm over the rapid depreciation of property, and inability of debtors to pay their creditors. Possibly the same man as the jurist.
- Quintus Considius Q. f. Gallus, perhaps the son of the jurist, was one of the heirs of Quintus Turius in 43 B.C.
- Publius Considius, a veteran soldier, who served under Sulla, Crassus, and Caesar, who mentions him in his account of his first campaign in Gaul, in 58 BC.
- Marcus Considius Nonianus, praetor in 52 BC, he assisted Pompeius in his preparations at Capua in 49.
- Gaius Considius Nonianus, triumvir monetalis in 57 BC. Like his brother, Marcus, he was a supporter of Pompeius.
- Gaius Considius C. f. Longus, propraetor in Africa at the time of the Civil War, he espoused the side of Pompeius, but fled following the defeat of Scipio at Thapsus in 46 BC, and was murdered by his own Gaetulian mercenaries.
- Gaius Considius C. f. C. n. Paetus, the son of Longus, fell into Caesar's power after the Battle of Thapsus and capture of Hadrumetum, but was pardoned. He was appointed moneyer shortly afterward, and the imagery on his coins demonstrate his gratitude to Caesar.
- Lucius Considius L. f. Gallus, held a number of offices under the early empire, having been tribune of the plebs, quaestor, praefectus urbi, quindecimvir sacris faciundis, and praetor peregrinus.
- Considius Aequus, an eques who falsely accused the praetor Magius Caecilianus of treason in AD 21, and was punished by Drusus.
- Considius Proculus, a man of praetorian rank, accused Publius Pomponius Secundus of plotting against the state, after the latter had given refuge to a friend of Sejanus in AD 31. In turn he was accused by Pomponius' brother, Quintus, and while celebrating his birthday was arrested and carried to the senate-house, where he was condemned and put to death. His sister, Sancia, was interdicted from fire and water.
- Considia, wife of Marcus Servilius Nonianus, consul in AD 35.

== See also ==
- List of Roman gentes

== Bibliography ==
- Marcus Tullius Cicero, De Lege Agraria contra Rullum, Epistulae ad Atticum, Epistulae ad Familiares, In Verrem, Pro Cluentio, Pro Ligario.
- Gaius Julius Caesar, Commentarii de Bello Gallico (Commentaries on the Gallic War), Commentarii de Bello Civili (Commentaries on the Civil War).
- Aulus Hirtius (attributed), De Bello Africo (On the African War).
- Dionysius of Halicarnassus, Romaike Archaiologia (Roman Antiquities).
- Titus Livius (Livy), History of Rome.
- Valerius Maximus, Factorum ac Dictorum Memorabilium (Memorable Facts and Sayings).
- Lucius Mestrius Plutarchus (Plutarch), Lives of the Noble Greeks and Romans.
- Publius Cornelius Tacitus, Annales.
- Lucius Cassius Dio Cocceianus (Cassius Dio), Roman History.
- Scholia Gronoviana, In Ciceronis Pro Ligario (Commentary on Cicero’s Oration Pro Ligario).
- Joseph Hilarius Eckhel, Doctrina Numorum Veterum (The Study of Ancient Coins, 1792–1798).
- Dictionary of Greek and Roman Biography and Mythology, William Smith, ed., Little, Brown and Company, Boston (1849).
- Bartolomeo Borghesi, Oeuvres complètes de Bartolomeo Borghesi, Imprimerie Nationale, Paris (1862).
- Michael Crawford, Roman Republican Coinage, Cambridge University Press (1974, 2001).
