= Vaona =

Vaona may refer to:

- Ancharius brevibarbis, fish
- Ancharius fuscus, fish
