= Marcus Vinicius (consul 19 BC) =

Consul of the Roman Empire

Consul of the Roman Republic
- In office Autumn 19 BC – December 19 BC Serving with Quintus Lucretius Vespillo
- Preceded by: Gaius Sentius Saturninus
- Succeeded by: Publius Cornelius Lentulus Marcellinus, and Gnaeus Cornelius Lentulus

Personal details
- Born: Cales, Italia
- Children: Publius Vinicius
- Awards: Ornamenta triumphalia

Military service
- Allegiance: Roman Empire
- Commands: Governor of Gallia Belgica (25 BC); Governor of Achaea? governor of Illyricum (14-13 BC)
- Battles/wars: Pannonian War; German Wars

Marcus Vinicius (also spelled Vinucius) was a Roman senator and general, who held a number of posts in the service of the first Roman emperor, Augustus. Vinicius was suffect consul in the latter part of 19 BC with Quintus Lucretius Vespillo as his colleague.

== Career ==
Born the son of a Roman knight at Cales in Regio I (Latium et Campania) of Italia, Vinicius distinguished himself as legatus Augusti pro praetore or governor of the imperial province of Gallia Belgica in 25 BC, when he led a successful campaign into Germania.

At some point, Vinicius may also have served as governor of the senatorial province of Achaea; an inscription from Corinth, dated to 18–12 BC and honoring his fellow-general, and the Emperor's right-hand man, Marcus Vipsanius Agrippa, reveals that an administrative division of the city had been named the tribus Vinicia, apparently in Vinicius' honor. In recognition of his services, Vinicius, the archetypal homo novus, was appointed suffect consul in 19 BC, replacing Gaius Sentius Saturninus.

After his consulship, Vinicius continued to be entrusted with important military commands. He served as governor of Illyricum at the beginning of a series of rebellions which were called by Roman sources bellum Pannonicum (Pannonian war, 14–10 BC) until late 13 BC when Augustus assigned the supreme command to Marcus Vipsanius Agrippa. An inscription found at Tusculum reads "... propraetor of Caesar Augustus in [Illyricum; he was the first to advance] beyond the river Danube; he [routed] the army of [the Dacians] and the Bastarnae in battle; he brought the Cotini, [Osi], . . . and Anartii [under the sway of Imperator Caesar] Augustus [and the Roman people].

Between AD 1 and 4, Vinicius commanded the five legions stationed in Germany. His army fought so successfully that he was awarded ornamenta triumphalia.

Throughout his life, Vinicius seems to have enjoyed a close friendship with the emperor: the historian Suetonius quotes a letter by Augustus in which he talks about playing dice with Vinicius and his fellow homo novus, Publius Silius Nerva.

== Family ==
Vinicius' son Publius was consul in AD 2. His grandson and namesake Marcus Vinicius was consul in 30 and the husband of Julia Livilla, sister of the emperor Caligula.

== Legacy ==
The Roman tribe Vinicia was probably named in his honor.

== Notes ==
Political offices
Preceded by Gaius Sentius Saturninus, sine collega as Ordinary consul	Suffect Consul of the Roman Empire; 19 BC with Quintus Lucretius Vespillo	Succeeded by Publius Cornelius Lentulus Marcellinus, and Gnaeus Cornelius Lentulus as Ordinary consuls
