= Gogo ornatus =

Scientific classification
- Kingdom: Animalia
- Phylum: Chordata
- Class: Actinopterygii
- Order: Siluriformes
- Family: Anchariidae
- Genus: Gogo
- Species: G. ornatus

Binomial name
- Gogo ornatus H. H. Ng & Sparks, 2005

Species of fish

Gogo ornatus is a species of catfish of the family Anchariidae endemic to Madagascar where it is found in the Mangoro River basin. It reaches a maximum standard length of 21.2 cm (8.3 in).
