= Gogo atratus =

Scientific classification
- Kingdom: Animalia
- Phylum: Chordata
- Class: Actinopterygii
- Order: Siluriformes
- Family: Anchariidae
- Genus: Gogo
- Species: G. atratus

Binomial name
- Gogo atratus H. H. Ng, Sparks & Loiselle, 2008

Species of fish

Gogo atratus is a species of catfish of the family Anchariidae endemic to Madagascar where it is found in the Mananara du Nord River drainage in northeastern Madagascar. It grows to a standard length of 17.1 cm (6.7 in).

G. atratus is strictly nocturnal. It reproduces at the end of the dry season and at the onset of the rainy season. The size of the eggs suggests that this species exhibits parental care, though this is unproven. G. atratus feed on aquatic insects and small freshwater shrimp.
