= Gogo arcuatus =

Scientific classification
- Kingdom: Animalia
- Phylum: Chordata
- Class: Actinopterygii
- Order: Siluriformes
- Family: Anchariidae
- Genus: Gogo
- Species: G. arcuatus

Binomial name
- Gogo arcuatus H. H. Ng & Sparks, 2005

Species of fish

Gogo arcuatus is a species of catfish of the family Anchariidae endemic to Madagascar where it is found in the Sandrananta River basin. It grows to standard length of 18.1 cm (7.1 in).
