= Furnia gens =

Ancient Roman family

The gens Furnia was a plebeian family at ancient Rome. The Furnian gens was of great antiquity, dating to the first century of the Republic; Gaius Furnius was tribune of the plebs in 445 BC. However, no member of the family achieved prominence again for nearly four hundred years.

== Members ==
This list includes abbreviated praenomina. For an explanation of this practice, see filiation.

- Gaius Furnius, tribune of the plebs in 445 BC. He opposed the rogation of that year, which would have opened the consulship to the plebeians. His name occurs only in Dionysius; Livy describes the proposal, but does not mention Furnius.
- Gaius Furnius, tribune of the plebs in 50 BC, was a friend of Cicero, with whom he frequently corresponded. He opposed the demand of the oligarchic party at Rome that Caesar should immediately resign as proconsul of Gaul. After Caesar's murder, Furnius espoused the side of Marcus Antonius, but after the Battle of Actium he was reconciled to Octavian through the exertions of his son. Furnius was consul designatus in 29 BC.
- Gaius Furnius C. f., successfully reconciled his father to Octavian following the Battle of Actium. He was consul in 17 BC.
- Furnius, put to death in AD 26, during the reign of Tiberius, for committing adultery with Claudia Pulchra. It seems unlikely that he was the same person as the consul.

== See also ==
- List of Roman gentes

== Bibliography ==
- Marcus Tullius Cicero, Epistulae ad Atticum, Epistulae ad Familiares.
- Dionysius of Halicarnassus, Romaike Archaiologia (Roman Antiquities).
- Titus Livius (Livy), History of Rome.
- Lucius Annaeus Seneca (Seneca the Younger), De Beneficiis (On Kindness).
- Publius Cornelius Tacitus, Annales.
- Lucius Annaeus Florus, Epitome de T. Livio Bellorum Omnium Annorum DCC (Epitome of Livy:
- Appianus Alexandrinus (Appian), Bellum Civile (The Civil War).
- Lucius Cassius Dio Cocceianus (Cassius Dio), Roman History.
- Dictionary of Greek and Roman Biography and Mythology, William Smith, ed., Little, Brown and Company, Boston (1849).
- René Cagnat et alii, L'Année épigraphique (The Year in Epigraphy, abbreviated AE), Presses Universitaires de France (1888–present).
- T. Robert S. Broughton, The Magistrates of the Roman Republic, American Philological Association (1952).
