= Turia (wife of Quintus Lucretius) =

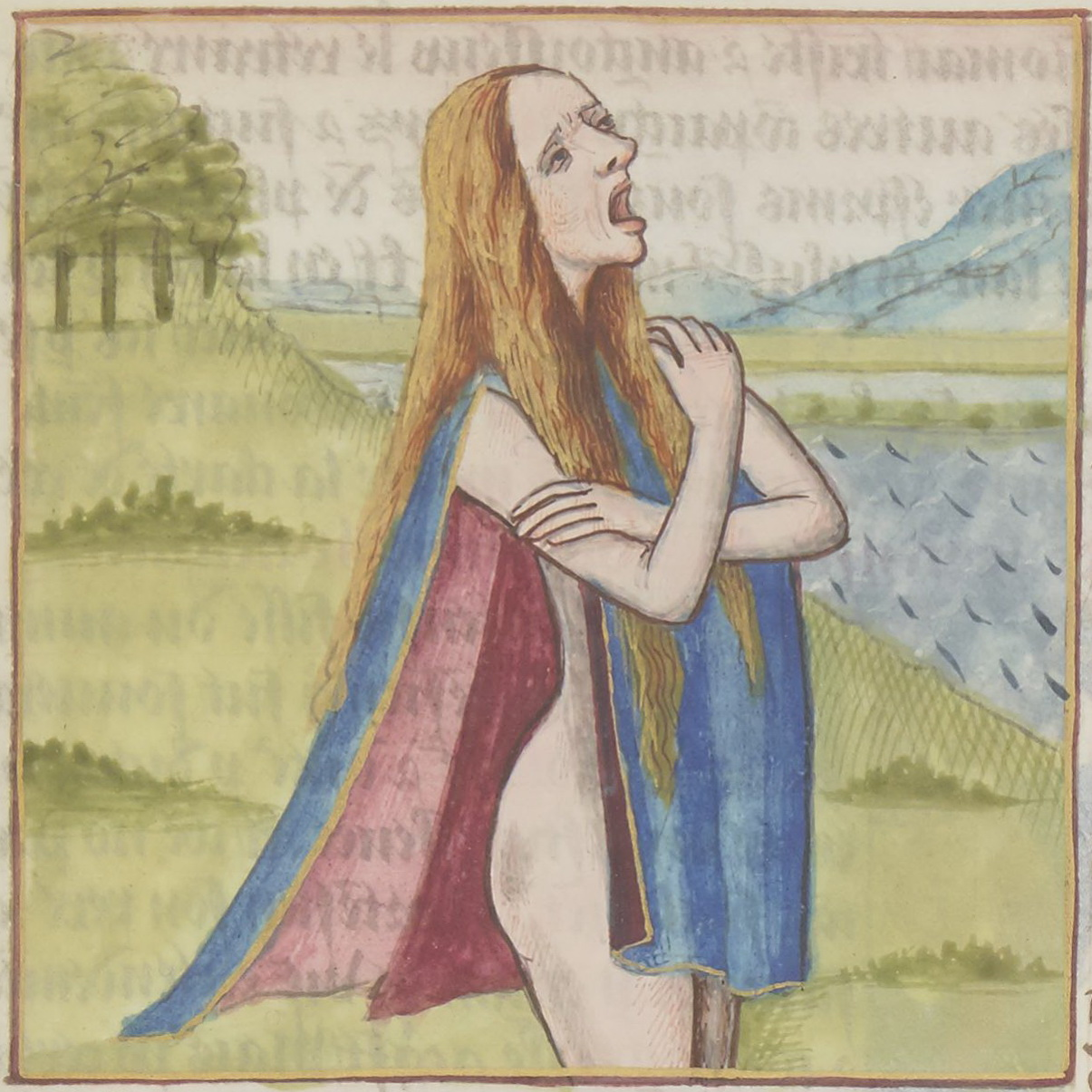
In De mulieribus claris

Turia (c. 60 BC – 5 BC) was a Roman woman, and the wife of Quintus Lucretius Vespillo.

== Life ==
Turia and Quintus were married sometime between 49 BC and 42 BC, and remained married for 40 years.

During the time of the Second Triumvirate (43–32 BC), Quintus Lucretius was named as one of several proscribed Roman citizens. Rather than turn him away or submit to his banishment, Turia hid her husband in their own home. She seems to have been so successful in her secrecy that it is noted that not even close friends of relatives ever suspected that he was still in Rome – the only one savvy to this deception was a young woman - most likely, an enslaved woman (ancilla) - who seems to have aided Turia during this time. Publicly, Turia presented herself as a grieving, distraught wife – she wore old, “unkept” clothes, appeared disheveled, and perhaps even acted crazed as though her grief has driven her mad. This made everyone believe she lost her husband and he was nowhere to be found.

The historian Appian briefly mentions Turia's concealment of her husband (Civil Wars 4.44). She is one of the three women mentioned by Valerius Maximus as examples of outstanding moral women. The other two were Tertia Aemilia and Sulpicia.

When Quintus Lucretius was proscribed by the triumvirs, his wife Turia hid him in her bedroom above the rafters. A single maidservant knew the secret. At great risk to herself, she kept him safe from imminent death.

== Research ==
The inscription called the Laudatio Turiae - in which a husband praises his wife - was traditionally assigned to Turia although it does not mention her name. Because the tombstone describes a wife of incredible character and unfaltering loyalty, it was once generally believed by scholars to be from Quintus to Turia.

The wife noted in the inscription was unable to bear children (infecunditas), but was so dedicated to her husband that she offered to grant him a divorce so they he might “find a suitable fertile woman” and would not “remain childless.” She seems to have also been willing to treat any future children that he fathered as her own, offering to share her inheritance and properties with them, should he bear them. Though it is entirely possible that this was an act of devotion to her husband, the Augustan legislation penalized childlessness while rewarding those people having multiple children (consider the Jus trium liberorum, "the right of three children"). He did not accept her offer of divorce and they remained married for the rest of their lives.

This assignment is no longer generally accepted.
