= Lucius Appuleius =

Tribune of the Plebs 391 BC

Lucius Appuleius (fl. 4th century BCE) was a man of ancient Rome who served as Tribune of the Plebs in 391 BCE. He impeached Marcus Furius Camillus for having secreted part of the spoils of war against the rival Etrurian city of Veii in 406.

== See also ==
- Appuleia gens
