= Ancharius griseus =

Scientific classification
- Domain: Eukaryota
- Kingdom: Animalia
- Phylum: Chordata
- Class: Actinopterygii
- Order: Siluriformes
- Family: Anchariidae
- Genus: Ancharius
- Species: A. griseus

Binomial name
- Ancharius griseus H. H. Ng & Sparks, 2005

Species of fish

Ancharius griseus is a species of catfish of family Anchariidae. It inhabits the Onilahy River basin of western Madagascar. A. griseus reaches about 24.4 cm (9.6 in) SL.

== See also ==
- Ancharius (fish)
- Ancharius fuscus
