= Gaius Considius Longus =

Gaius Considius Longus (died 46 BC) was a Roman politician and general in the last years of the Roman Republic. As a commander in Africa, he fought on the Pompeian side during Caesar's Civil War and was killed by his own retinue in 46 BC as he attempted to escape after Julius Caesar's victory at Thapsus.

== Life ==
Considius held the praetorship at an unknown date, not later than 52 BC, and followed it by governing the province of Africa as propraetor. During his administration in 50 BC, he travelled to Rome to seek the consulship, leaving Quintus Ligarius as his representative. When Caesar's Civil War broke out, he returned to Africa with other supporters of Pompey. He and P. Attius Varus are described as legatus pro praetore in an inscription from Curubis (modern Korba), which they fortified: they would have held the office as subordinate commanders first to Pompey, then, after Pompey's death in 48 BC, to Metellus Scipio, who succeeded Pompey to command of the senatorial side against Julius Caesar. Considius held Hadrumentum with one legion and took part in successful operations against Caesar's general Gaius Scribonius Curio. By the time that Caesar reached Africa in 46 BC, Considius had increased his troops to two legions and 700 cavalry. Caesar's legate Lucius Munatius Plancus tried to negotiate with Considius, sending a captive to him carrying a letter. Considius asked who it was from. On hearing that it was from "the imperator Caesar", he replied "The only imperator of the Roman people at this time is Scipio" and ordered his men to execute the captive and send the letters on to Scipio unread. He undertook ineffective operations against Acylla, a town which had gone over to Caesar's side. Shortly after this he was in the town of Thysdra (modern El Djem) with soldiers and a retinue of gladiators and Gaetulians. It was here that he learnt that Caesar had been victorious at the Battle of Thapsus. He left the town secretly, attempting to escape to Numidia, ruled by his ally, Juba I but underway, his Gaetulian retinue killed him for the money he was carrying and fled.

== Family ==
The Bellum Africum mentions a son: Caesar captured him at Hadrumentum after the Battle of Thapsus and spared his life. Theodor Mommsen accepted the view of Bartolomeo Borghesi that C. Considius Paetus, a late republican moneyer, was the same person; but Michael Crawford, in the most recent catalogue of republican coinage says only "the moneyer is a C. Considius Paetus, not otherwise known".

== Literature ==
=== Primary sources ===
Our chief source is the anonymous Bellum Africum ("The African War"), also known as De Bello Africo ("On the African War"), an anonymous account of Julius Caesar's African campaign, which supplements Caesar's own account of the civil war and seems to have been written by a soldier who had served under Caesar on the campaign. It is usually included in a larger text along with other accounts of the last stages of the civil war, the Bellum Hispaniense (War in Spain) and Bellum Alexandrinum (War in Alexandria). For Considius' earlier career we have some information from Cicero's speech Pro Quinto Ligario ("On behalf of Quintus Ligarius") and the ancient commentary to this, first edited by Jakob Gronovius and so known as the Scholia Gronoviana, but now generally cited from the edition of Thomas Stangl.

=== Secondary literature ===
- Brennan, T. Corey (2000), The Praetorship of the Roman Republic (Oxford:OUP) vol. II ISBN 0-19-511460-4
- Münzer, F. (1901), "C. Considius C. f. Longus" (Considius 11), R.E. IV 913–4.

== See also ==
- Considia gens
