= Gaius Sentius Saturninus (consul 19 BC) =

Ancient Roman politician and general

Consul of the Roman Republic
- In office January – Autumn 19 BC Serving with Quintus Lucretius Vespillo
- Preceded by: Marcus Appuleius with Publius Silius Nerva
- Succeeded by: Marcus Vinicius

Personal details
- Children: Gaius Sentius Saturninus; Gnaeus Sentius Saturninus; Lucius Sentius Saturninus,
- Awards: Ornamenta triumphalia

Military service
- Allegiance: Roman Empire
- Commands: Governor of Africa; Governor of Syria
- Battles/wars: German Wars; Great Illyrian Revolt

Gaius Sentius Saturninus (fl. late 1st century BC – 1st century AD) was a Roman senator and military officer who was appointed Roman consul in 19 BC. He served as the proconsular governor of Africa, and later as imperial governor of Syria. He then served several times as a senior military officer working with the future emperor Tiberius in campaigns against the Marcomanni, gaining the distinction of being awarded triumphal ornaments. Later he campaigned in Germania and Illyria.

== Biography ==
Gaius Sentius Saturninus was a novus homo (Latin for "new man"), the term used in ancient Rome for a man who was the first in his family to serve in the Roman Senate or, more specifically, to be elected as consul. He could trace descent from a senatorial family from Atina. His father was a senator who supported Sextus Pompey, serving as an envoy on his behalf to Marcus Antonius in Greece in 40 BC, but at some point he switched allegiance to Octavian, who was later to become emperor as Augustus.

He served as a senior military officer, but details of his career are not known. In 19 BC he was elected consul, the highest honour of the Roman state. By this period it was in the effective gift of Emperor Augustus and candidates were chosen carefully by him. Apparently Augustus intended to be the other consul, but he never took office and at some point through his term Saturninus was joined by Quintus Lucretius Vespillo. Saturninus' period as a consul ended at some point between 1 August and 12 October and Marcus Vinicius served out the rest of the year. During his period in office Saturninus intervened to prevent the candidature of the demagogue Marcus Egnatius Rufus, whom he imprisoned and then executed.

As a member of the Quindecimviri sacris faciundis, one of the most prestigious colleges (collegia) of state high priests, Saturninus played a major role in the Saecular Games of 17 BC.

In 14 or 13 BC, Saturninus was appointed the proconsular governor of Africa. This roughly corresponded with modern Tunisia and was an important post as the province was a major source of imported food for the city of Rome.

=== Syria ===
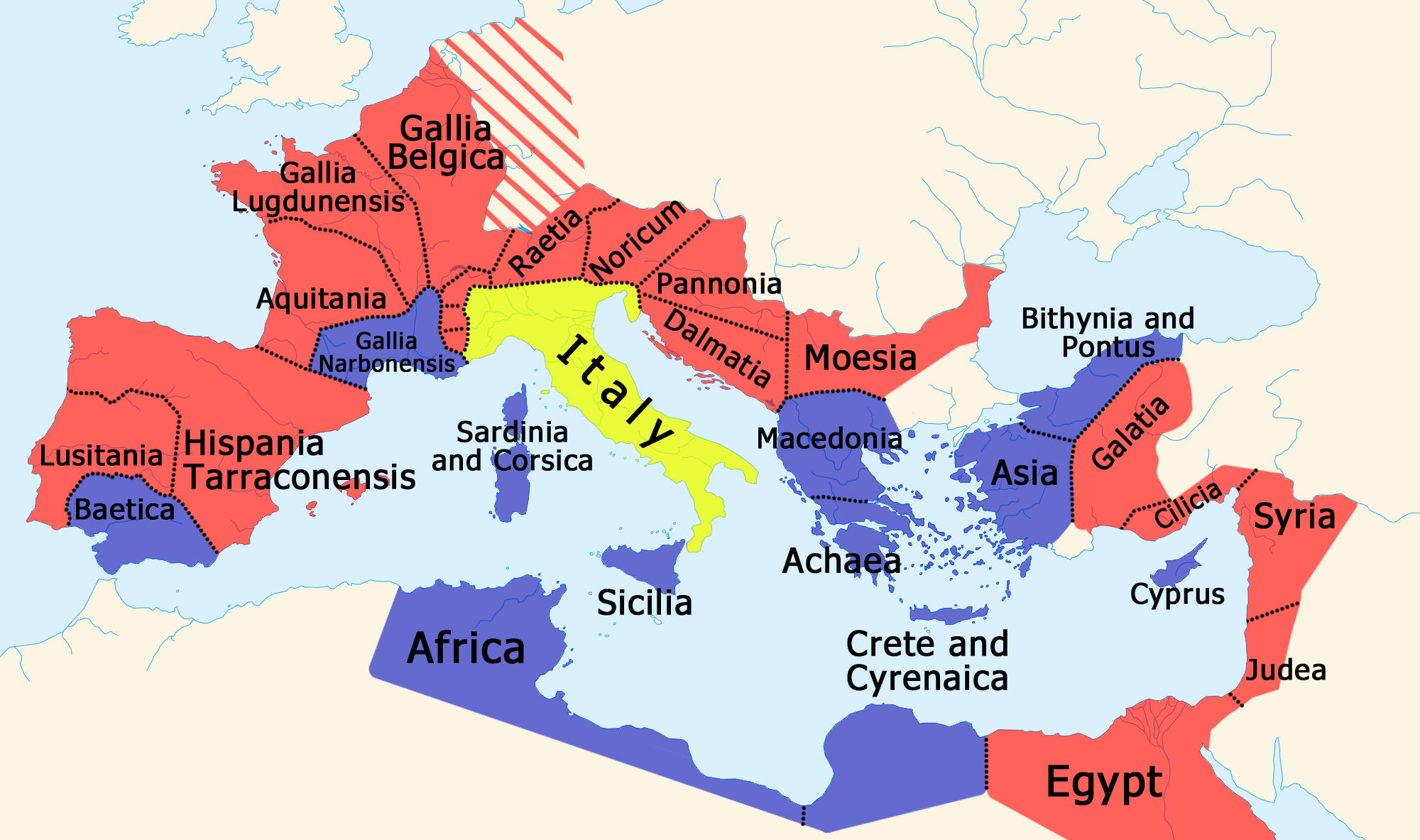
The Roman Empire under Augustus

From 9 BC – 7 BC Saturninus served as Legatus Augusti pro praetore (imperial governor) of the Roman province of Syria. During his time as governor of Syria, he was caught up in the intrigues of the Herodian family. Following instructions from Augustus, he convened a council at Berytus to rule on accusations of treason made by Herod the Great against his sons Aristobulus and Alexander. Saturninus suggested a ruling of mercy, supported by his staff which included Saturninus' three sons, who were his legates. However, the procurator, the chief financial officer of the province, along with the majority of the council, voted against Herod's sons, resulting in their condemnation and execution.

Tertullian (c. 160 – 225 AD), the Christian law expert from Carthage in North Africa, wrote that Jesus was born while Gaius Sentius Saturninus was legate of Syria. In combination with other sources this suggests Jesus was born in 8 or 7 BC. There was no Roman governor in Judaea at this time. Direct Roman rule came into force with the banishment of Herod's son, Herod Archelaus in 6 AD. Most authorities, such as Syme, disagree with this date and favour a later date of 4 BC for the birth of Christ. This is considered unlikely by most experts, considering the date of King Herod's death (probably 4 BC) and the events which preceded it.

=== Germania ===
In AD 4 Saturninus replaced Marcus Vinicius in Germania, and for the next two years served under the command of Tiberius. During this time he was awarded the ornamenta triumphalia, "triumphal ornaments" or an ovation; Augustus had restricted full triumphs to members of the imperial family. His final campaign in Germany was in AD 6, when he marched from Moguntiacum, and was meant to join up with Tiberius who was marching from Carnuntum, with the intent of crushing King Maroboduus and the Marcomanni. However, the Great Illyrian Revolt forced them to return, and Saturninus was replaced in Germania by Publius Quinctilius Varus.

=== Personal life ===
Saturninus was a described as energetic and valorous by Marcus Velleius Paterculus. He had three sons, two of whom reached the consulate: Gaius Sentius Saturninus, consul in AD 4; Gnaeus Sentius Saturninus, consul for part of the same year; his third son was Lucius Sentius Saturninus, who disappears from the historical record after his father's governorship of Syria.

== Footnotes ==
Political offices
Preceded by Marcus Appuleius, and Publius Silius Nerva as Ordinary consuls	Consul of the Roman Empire; 19 BC with no colleagues, then Quintus Lucretius Vespillo	Succeeded by Marcus Vinicius as Suffect consul
