= Marcus Egnatius Rufus =

Roman politician (killed 19 BC)

Marcus Egnatius Rufus (died 19 BCE in Rome) was a Roman senator and politician at the time of Augustus.

In 22 BCE, he served as an aedile and became very popular with the residents of Rome by setting up a private fire brigade. In contrast to earlier enterprises of this kind, which, like the fire brigade of Marcus Licinius Crassus, only worked for payment, Egnatius made the 600 slaves he financed available free of charge to fight fires. Because of the numerous fires in the city, he gained great popularity and was elected praetor as early as 21 BCE without observing the usual waiting period.

In 19 BCE, he stood for election as consul, but the consul Gaius Sentius Saturninus prevented this, probably at the instigation of Augustus. Egnatius was accused of conspiring against Augustus. Seneca includes him in the multiple conspiracy and assassination attempts against Augustus. The Senate passed the senatus consultum ultimum, an emergency measure suspending usual procedures, and Egnatius was imprisoned and executed with some of his followers. Karl-Wilhelm Weeber claims that Augustus saw Egnatius as a political competitor who could have become dangerous to the princeps because of his popularity with the people.

After Egnatius' death, Augustus set up his own fire brigade, which also consisted of 600 slaves, and later, in 7 or 6 BCE the fire brigade was enlarged, now consisting of 3,500 freedmen, the vigiles, who were divided into seven cohorts of 500 men each and made subordinate to a praefectus vigilum. In about 200 CE, their number was doubled to 7,000 men.

== Sources ==
- Ph. Badot: A propos de la conspiration de M. Egnatius Rufus. In: Latomus. 32, 1977, p. 606–615.
