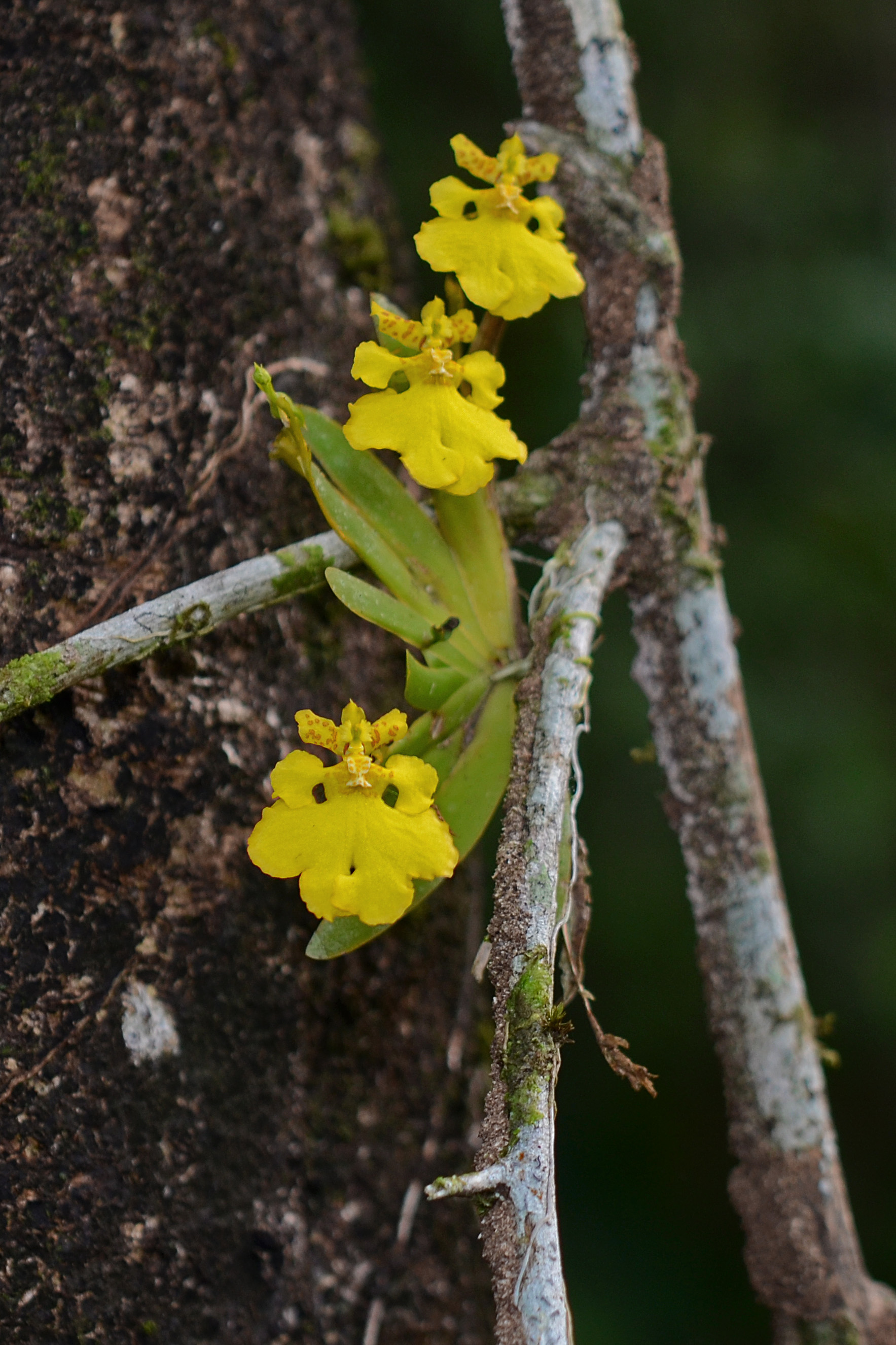

Scientific classification
- Kingdom: Plantae
- Clade: Tracheophytes
- Clade: Angiosperms
- Clade: Monocots
- Order: Asparagales
- Family: Orchidaceae
- Subfamily: Epidendroideae
- Genus: Erycina
- Species: E. pusilla

Binomial name
- Erycina pusilla (L.) N.H.Williams & M.W.Chase

= Erycina pusilla =

Species of orchid

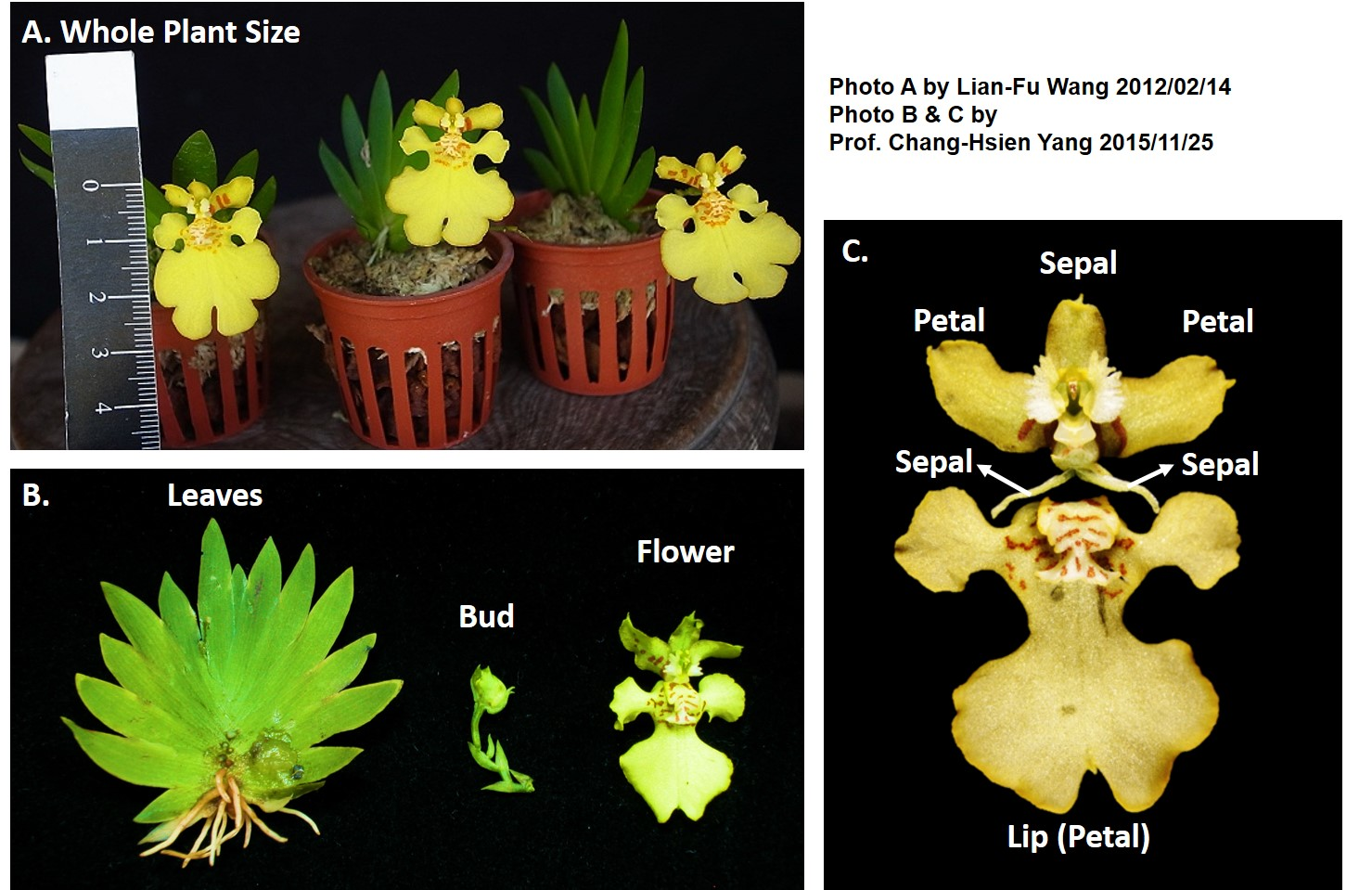
Erycina pusilla

Erycina pusilla is a species of flowering plants, which is a tiny orchid with an overall size of 2.5 to 3.5 cm from the orchid family, Orchidaceae. Its species are native to Mexico, Belize, Central America, South America and Trinidad. The leaves are shaped like a lance head (lanceolate) and arranged in a fan. Unlike other similar orchids, E. pusilla never develops lengthwise folded leaves (conduplicate leaves) or extra storage organs (pseudobulbs).

The blooming season is from fall to spring. It produces solitary light-yellow orchid-shaped flowers. In comparison to the overall plant size, these flowers can reach a relatively large size (1 to 2.5 cm). The lateral sepals are united near the flower base.

Compared to other orchids, E. pusilla has a short life cycle (about 17 months). It can reach adulthood in just one season, while the majority of the orchids reach maturity in up to 5 years.

== Name ==
It is commonly known as the tiny psygmorchis, due to its miniature size.

The current scientific name is Erycina pusilla. The etymology of its scientific name refers to its beauty and tiny size: "Erycina" is a byname of the Roman goddess for beauty, Venus (Venus of Eryx), and "pusilla" is Latin meaning "very little". It was formerly classified in the genus Psygmorchis, due to its fan-shaped leaves ("psygmos" Greek for fan).

=== Synonyms ===
Homotypic synonyms:

- Epidendrum pusillum L., Sp. Pl. ed. 2: 1352 (1763)
- Cymbidium pusillum (L.) Sw., Nova Acta Regiae Soc. Sci. Upsal. 6: 74 (1799).
- Oncidium pusillum (L.) Mutel, Mém. Soc. Roy. Centr. Agric. Dépt. N. 1835-1836: 84 (1837).
- Tolumnia pusilla (L.) Hoehne, Ic. Orch. Bras.: 231 (1949).
- Psygmorchis pusilla (L.) Dodson & Dressler, Phytologia 24: 288 (1972).

Heterotypic synonyms:

- Oncidium iridifolium Kunth in F.W.H.von Humboldt, A.J.A.Bonpland & C.S.Kunth, Nov. Gen. Sp. 1: 344 (1816).
- Epidendrum ventilabrum Vell., Fl. Flumin. 9: t. 32 (1831).
- Oncidium allemanii Barb.Rodr., Gen. Spec. Orchid. 2: 185 (1882).
- Oncidium pusillum var. megalanthum Schltr., Repert. Spec. Nov. Regni Veg. Beih. 27: 115 (1924).
- Psygmorchis allemanii (Barb.Rodr.) Garay & Stacy, Bradea 1: 408 (1974).
- Erycina allemanii (Barb.Rodr.) N.H.Williams & M.W.Chase, Lindleyana 16: 136 (2001).

== Distribution and habitat ==
Erycina pusilla can be found in the neotropical region, including South and Central America, the southern Mexican lowlands, the Caribbean islands and southern Florida.

Its habitat consists of humid forests at elevations of 500 to 950 metres (1,640 to 3,120 ft) with temperatures varying from warm to hot. Like many orchids, E. pusilla grows harmlessly upon other plants. It gets moisture and nutrients from the surroundings without affecting the host plant (commensalism).

Its quick development permits this orchid to grow on relatively short-lasting sites such as twigs or even leaves of bushes and trees, such as coffee plant or hibiscus. For this reason, it is usually classified as a twig epiphyte.

== Use in science ==
Erycina pusilla is a promising model candidate for Oncidium research. Its relatively tiny size and its short life cycle, facilitates its cultivation. Additionally, it has the ability to complete its life cycle in vitro. The functional genomic research is easier because E. pusilla only has 6 chromosomes and a small genome size (1.5 pg 1C nucleus). Another aspect that speaks for the use of this orchid in research, is the rare pollination and production of seeds in nature. This reduces the risk of undesired propagation of transgenic lines. The rapid growth and the low chromosome numbers make E. pusilla is also an excellent parent for traditional hybridization methods. All these characteristics make E. pusilla a promising model not only for research, but also for commercial breeding, since it constitutes an excellent parent for traditional hybridization methods. Beyond the use of this orchid for research and commercial purposes, E. pusilla has also medical applications. The ingestion of whole plant cooked treats colic and stomachache. Additionally, the whole plant boiled is also used as a wash to treat lacerations cuts and wounds.

=== In vitro cultivation ===
Sporadic flowering in flasks was first reported by Livingston (1962), although the in vitro cultivation was just established (2007). The primary culture of E. pusilla becomes a callus after about one month of cultivation. Three months later it reaches leaf stage and after eight months the flowering stage begins. After two and half months E. pusilla produces fruits. A new cycle can start from a new primary culture: protocorm-like body (PLB) in vitro.

=== Genome ===
The transcriptome sequence of E. pusilla is available (Orchidstra Database). Some basic molecular resources were also established, including the sequencing of the chloroplast genome, the transcriptome and the BAC library. The miRNA database of E. pusilla, including the identification of miRNA biosynthesis-related genes and miRNA families, was established in 2013.

The chloroplast genome has been sequenced efficiently and economically by using BAC library and next-generation sequencing. The chloroplast genome of E. pusilla is 143.164 bp in size, which contains a pair of inverted repeats (IRa and IRb) of 23.439 bp separated by large and small single copy regions of 84.189 and 12.097 bp, respectively. From these result compare to Oncidium, the gene order of chloroplast genome between E. pusilla and Oncidium are similar. In Taiwan, different hybridization compatibility of E. pusilla with Oncidium, Rodriguezia and Tolumnia was found by crossing with several important Oncidiinae orchids.

=== MADS-box genes ===
Due to their role in plant growth, the characterization of MADS-box genes in E. pusilla has turned into a hot topic for both researchers and commercial orchid breeders. MADS-box genes encode for MADS-domain proteins, which are generally transcription factors. In plants, these proteins control key developmental processes throughout almost all life stages.

To date, 28 MADS-box genes were isolated in E. pusilla, namely EpMADS1 to 28. Nearly all of them contain introns greater than 10 kb, which reflects the complexity of the E. pusilla genome. Many EpMADS genes have expression patterns similar to those MADS-box genes in Arabidopsis. The 28 proteins, encoded by the E. pusilla MADS-box genes, are classified as type I or type II based on BLASTP analyses.

== Other sources ==
- Pridgeon, A.M., Cribb, P.J., Chase, M.A. & Rasmussen, F. eds. (1999). Genera Orchidacearum Vols 1–3. Oxford Univ. Press.
- Berg Pana, H. 2005. Handbuch der Orchideen-Namen. Dictionary of Orchid Names. Dizionario dei nomi delle orchidee. Ulmer, Stuttgart.
- Establishment of an Agrobacterium-mediated genetic transformation procedure for the experimental model orchid Erycina pusilla. Shu-Hong Lee, Chia-Wen Li, Chia-Hui, Liau Pao-Yi, Chang Li-Jen Liao, Choun-Sea Lin Ming-Tsair Chan, Plant Cell, Tissue and Organ Culture, January 2015, Volume 120, Issue 1, pp 211–220
