= Lucius Saenius =

Roman suffect consul 30 BC

Lucius Saenius (possibly Lucius Saenius Balbinus) (fl. 1st century BC) was a Roman senator and suffect consul in 30 BC as the colleague of Augustus.

== Biography ==
Ronald Syme notes the gentilicum "Saenius" is "patently Etruscan", and suggests some kind of connection between the senator and the town Saenia Julia (modern Siena). He was probably the son of a senator of the same name who had achieved no high offices. Saenius was considered to be one of the men who owed their career completely to Octavian and whom Octavian could use as a tool for his own purposes.

In 30 BC, Saenius was appointed consul suffectus (and it is conjectured that he may be the same person as the Balbinus whom Appian describes as being consul in this same year.) During his time in office he issued the Lex Saenia, which regulated the adlection of plebeians to the patriciate by means of a lex curiata (or law passed by the Curiate Assembly). He also intervened in protecting Junia Secunda, who was accused by Gaius Maecenas of being involved in the conspiracy led by her son, Lepidus the Younger, against Octavian.

Political offices
Preceded by Marcus Tullius Cicero as consul suffectus	Suffect Consul of the Roman Empire; 30 BC with Octavianus IV	Succeeded by Octavianus V Sextus Appuleius as consul ordinarius
