= Gogo (fish) =

Scientific classification
- Kingdom: Animalia
- Phylum: Chordata
- Class: Actinopterygii
- Order: Siluriformes
- Family: Anchariidae
- Genus: Gogo; H. H. Ng & Sparks, 2005

Type species
- Gogo ornatus H. H. Ng & Sparks, 2005

Genus of fishes

Gogo is a small genus of catfishes (order Siluriformes) of the family Anchariidae. It includes four species.

Gogo species are all endemic to freshwater rivers in eastern Madagascar; they are primarily found in highland habitats with clear, swift water. These fish range in size from about 17.1–25.0 centimetres (6.7–9.8 inches) in length.

== Species ==
There are currently four recognized species in this genus:

- Gogo arcuatus H. H. Ng & Sparks, 2005
- Gogo atratus H. H. Ng, Sparks & Loiselle, 2008
- Gogo brevibarbis (Boulenger, 1911)
- Gogo ornatus H. H. Ng & Sparks, 2005
