= Ancharia gens =

Family in ancient Rome

The gens Ancharia, occasionally written Ancaria, was a plebeian family of ancient Rome. The first of the gens to achieve prominence was Quintus Ancharius, a senator early in the first century BC.

== Origin ==
The origin of the Ancharii is uncertain, but the nomen Ancharius may be derived from Ancharia, a name of the goddess Angerona, by which she was known at Faesulae. The ancestor of the Ancharii may have been particularly devoted to the worship of Angerona. As Faesulae was an Etruscan city, the family may have been of Etruscan origin. According to M. Torelli the gens became active in Rome after the Marsic War.

== Praenomina ==
The praenomina associated with the Ancharii include Quintus, Publius, and Marcus.

== Branches and cognomina ==
The cognomina used by the Ancharii included Priscus, a common surname meaning "elder" or "old-fashioned", and Soter, a savior or protector. The latter surname was borne by a freedwoman, and was probably not used by other members of the gens.

== Members ==
- Quintus Ancharius, a senator slain by Marius upon his return from Africa in 87 BC. He had been praetor, but the year is uncertain.
- Quintus Ancharius, tribune of the plebs in 59 and praetor in 56 BC, received the province of Macedonia for 55. He might have been the son of the praetorian killed by Marius.
- Ancharia, the first wife of Gaius Octavius, the father of Augustus. She was the mother of Octavia the Elder, while Augustus and Octavia the Younger were his children by Atia. She may have been the daughter of Quintus Ancharius, the praetor of 56 BC.
- Marcus Ancharius, one of the duumvirs at Falerio in Picenum, who dedicated an inscription in honor of Octavia, the sister of Augustus, between AD 14 and 20.
- Ancharius Priscus, prosecuted Caesius Cordus, proconsul of Crete, for treason and extortion in AD 21.
- Publia Ancharia Soteris, a freedwoman in Bithynia. Pliny the Younger asked the emperor Trajan to grant her the Ius Quiritium, thereby making her a Roman citizen.
- Quintus Ancarius, Praeses Orientis in AD 258.

== See also ==
- List of Roman gentes

== Bibliography ==
- Marcus Tullius Cicero, Epistulae ad Familiares, Pro Sestio.
- Gaius Plinius Caecilius Secundus (Pliny the Younger), Epistulae (Letters).
- Publius Cornelius Tacitus, Annales.
- Gaius Suetonius Tranquillus, De Vita Caesarum (Lives of the Caesars, or The Twelve Caesars).
- Appianus Alexandrinus (Appian), Bellum Civile (The Civil War).
- Dictionary of Greek and Roman Biography and Mythology, William Smith, ed., Little, Brown and Company, Boston (1849).
- Theodor Mommsen et alii, Corpus Inscriptionum Latinarum (The Body of Latin Inscriptions, abbreviated CIL), Berlin-Brandenburgische Akademie der Wissenschaften (1853–present).
- Encyclopædia Britannica, Eleventh Edition (1911).
- Mika Kajava, Roman Female Praenomina: Studies in the Nomenclature of Roman Women, Acta Instituti Romani Finlandiae (1994).
- David Wardle, Suetonius: Life of Augustus, Oxford University Press (2014).
