= Balbinus (Roman consul) =

Ancient Roman consul

Balbinus was a politician of Ancient Rome who lived in the 1st century BCE.

He was proscribed by the triumvirs in 43 BCE, but was restored with Sextus Pompey in 39 BCE, and was, according to the historian Appian, subsequently advanced to the consulship. No author besides Appian, and none of the Fasti, mention a consul with this name, however. Appian writes that Balbinus was consul in the same year in which Marcus Aemilius Lepidus Minor was executed for conspiring against Octavian, in 30 BCE. Based on this, it is conjectured that Balbinus may be the cognomen of Lucius Saenius, who was consul suffectus in that year.
