= Publius Silius Nerva =

Roman consul 20 BC

Publius Silius Nerva was a Roman senator and general, who flourished under the reign of Augustus. He was consul in 20 BC as the colleague of Marcus Appuleius.

== Biography ==
Nerva was the son of a senator who had achieved the rank of propraetor. A partisan of the emperor Augustus, Nerva was rewarded with a number of important postings throughout his career.

Having risen through the ranks of the cursus honorum, he was awarded the consulate in 20 BC, becoming one of the many homines novi ennobled during Augustus's Principate.

After his consulate he was posted to Hispania Citerior in 19 BC as legatus, where he was involved in the ongoing Cantabrian Wars, helping Marcus Vipsanius Agrippa finally end the long and bloody campaign. Following this he was posted to Illyricum where he was legate from 17 to 16 BC.

Nerva had three sons, all consular: Publius Silius (consul suffectus AD 3), Aulus Licinius Nerva Silianus (consul AD 7), and Gaius Silius (consul AD 13).

== See also ==
- List of Roman consuls

== Sources ==
- T. Robert S. Broughton, The Magistrates of the Roman Republic (1952).
- Syme, Ronald, The Roman Revolution, Clarendon Press, Oxford, 1939.

Political offices
| Preceded by Marcus Lollius, and Quintus Aemilius Lepidus | Consul of the Roman Empire; 20 BC with Marcus Appuleius | Succeeded by Gaius Sentius Saturninus, and Quintus Lucretius Vespillo |
