= Marcus Appuleius =

Marcus Appuleius (c. 55 BC – c. 15 BC) was a nephew of the Roman emperor Augustus and Roman consul in 20 BC with Publius Silius Nerva as his colleague.

== Biography ==
Marcus Appuleius is postulated to have been the son of Sextus Appuleius and Octavia the Elder, therefore making him related to the emperor Augustus through his grandfather Gaius Octavius. For many years associated with the quaestor of Asia in 45 BC who joined Marcus Junius Brutus after the assassination of Julius Caesar, this is now held to have been his uncle of the same name.

In 23/22 BC, Marcus Appuleius was a legate at Tridentum. He was next elected consul in 20 BC, while Augustus was away from Rome. Unlike the elections of 21 BC and 19 BC, these were not interrupted by electoral discord.

There is no record of him taking any other post after his consulship. It has therefore been speculated that Marcus Appuleius died sometime shortly after his consulship, and definitely by the time that Marcus Vipsanius Agrippa had died in 12 BC, as Appuleius' brother Sextus Appuleius, the consul of 29 BC, was present at the funeral, but Marcus was not.

Ronald Syme has speculated that he may have been married to his half-cousin Claudia Marcella Minor.

== See also ==
- List of Roman consuls

== Sources ==
- Broughton, T. Robert S., The Magistrates of the Roman Republic, Vol III (1986)
- Syme, Ronald, The Augustan Aristocracy (1986) Clarendon Press

Political offices
Preceded by Marcus Lollius, and Quintus Aemilius Lepidus	Consul of the Roman Empire; 20 BC with Publius Silius Nerva	Succeeded by Gaius Sentius Saturninus, and Quintus Lucretius Vespillo
