= Quintus Ancharius (killed by Marius) =

Ancient Roman senator

Quintus Ancharius (c. 128 – 87 BC) was a senator of Ancient Rome. He was of praetorian rank, and was killed by Marius during Marius's purge of his enemies on his return to Rome from the Roman province of Africa in 87 BC.

The historian Plutarch paints a picture of Marius killing Ancharius in the street. Some scholars believe that while Ancharius was indeed murdered, Plutarch's story of Ancharius's death at the hands of Marius was exaggerated to depict Marius as committing an otherwise random and wanton killing. The depiction of the same event in the accounts of Appian and Florus describes Ancharius as already having been condemned, and approaching Marius to beg clemency, which Marius denied. His severed head was displayed publicly with that of Marcus Antonius.
