= Quintus Lucretius Vespillo =

Roman consul

Quintus Lucretius Vespillo was a Roman senator and consul, whose career commenced during the late Roman Republic and concluded in the reign of emperor Augustus.

He was in the past believed to be the author of the Laudatio Turiae, a tombstone engraved with an epitaph in the form of a husband's eulogy for his wife, Turia, but this is rejected by modern scholars.

== See also ==
- List of Roman consuls

== Footnotes ==
Political offices
Preceded by Marcus Appuleius, and Publius Silius Nerva as Ordinary consuls	Suffect consul of the Roman Empire; 19 BC with Gaius Sentius Saturninus, followed by Marcus Vinicius	Succeeded by Publius Cornelius Lentulus Marcellinus, and Gnaeus Cornelius Lentulus as Ordinary consuls
