= Octavia the Elder =

Roman woman

- Spouse: Sextus Appuleius
- Children: Sextus Appuleius; Marcus Appuleius
- Parents: Gaius Octavius (father); Ancharia (mother)

Octavia the Elder (Note: Also known as Octavia Major or Octavia Maior.) (before 69 BC – after 29 BC) was the daughter of the Roman governor and senator Gaius Octavius by his first wife, Ancharia. She was the elder half-sister to Octavia the Younger and Roman Emperor Augustus.

== Biography ==
=== Early life ===
Octavia was born to Ancharia and Octavius likely some time before 69 BC.

=== Marriage and issue ===
Octavia the Elder was married to Sextus Appuleius (I). They had a son, who was also named Sextus Appuleius, he served as ordinary consul in 29 BC with his half-uncle, Augustus. It is postulated that they had a second son, Marcus Appuleius, the consul of 20 BC. Through Sextus Appuleius, the consul, she had a grandson named Sextus Appuleius, consul in AD 14, and a granddaughter Appuleia Varilla. Octavia the Elder's last known descendants were her great-grandson, also named Sextus Appuleius, through her grandson and Fabia Numantina.

== Research ==
Plutarch was only aware of one daughter of Gaius Octavius and confused Octavia the Elder with Octavia the Younger.

Octavia's existence as wife of Appuleius was first discovered due to a dedication from when her husband was proconsul of Asia.

It is uncertain if Octavia died before or after her siblings. A dedication by a man named Marcus Ancharius dated after 14 AD to a woman named Octavia who was the sister of a prominent man (the name of whom is lost due to the inscription being damaged) might be for her.

== Cultural depictions ==
Octavia and her husband, as well as their two sons, may be depicted on the Ara Pacis.

== See also ==
- List of Roman women
- Women in ancient Rome

== Sources ==
- Herzog-Hauser, Gertrud: (Octavia 95). In: Realencyclopädie der Classischen Altertumswissenschaft, vol. XVII 2, col. 1858–1859.
- Suetonius; Life of Augustus
- Syme, Ronald; Augustan Aristocracy (Oxford University Press, 1989). ISBN 0-19-814731-7, ISBN 978-0-19-814731-2
