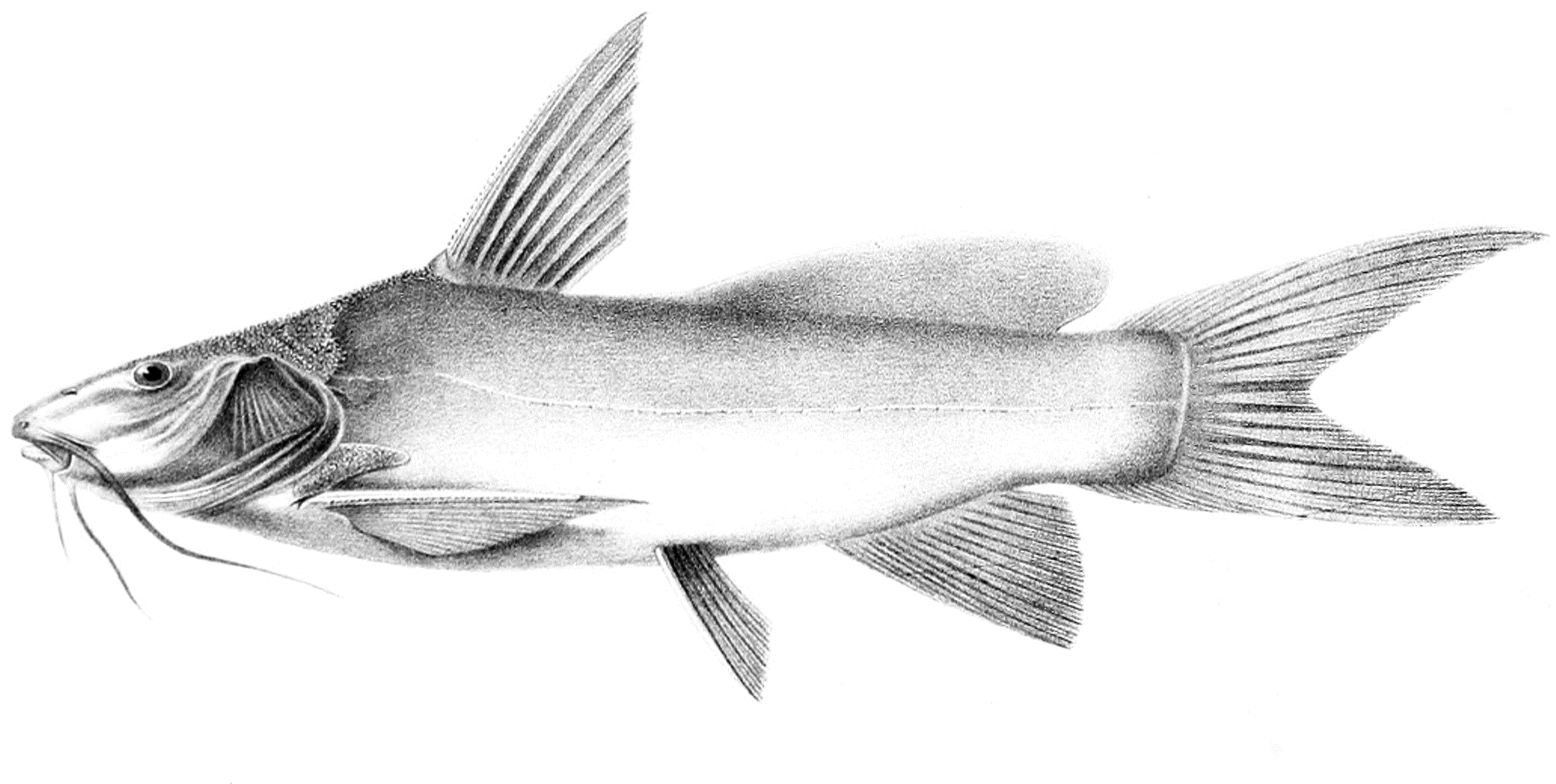
- Ancharius fuscus

Scientific classification
- Kingdom: Animalia
- Phylum: Chordata
- Class: Actinopterygii
- Order: Siluriformes
- Family: Anchariidae
- Genus: Ancharius; Steindachner, 1880

Type species
- Ancharius fuscus Steindachner, 1880

= Ancharius (fish) =

Genus of fishes

Ancharius, the Vaonas, is a small genus of catfishes (order Siluriformes) of the family Anchariidae.

Ancharius has been variably placed in Mochokidae, Ariidae, and Anchariidae. They are endemic to Madagascar.

== Species ==
This genus currently contain two described species:

- Ancharius fuscus Steindachner, 1880
- Ancharius griseus H. H. Ng & Sparks, 2005
