= Laudatio Turiae =

Latin inscription from last 1st century BC in eulogy of deceased wife

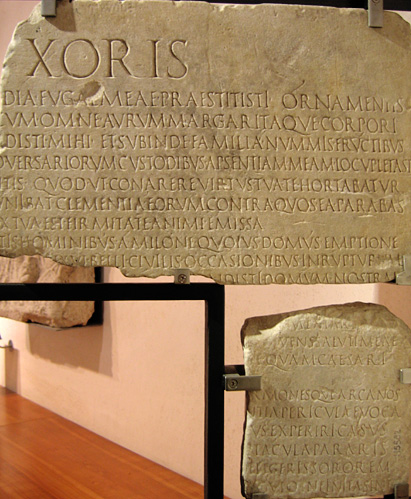
Fragments F and G of laudatio Turiae

The laudatio Turiae (CIL VI, 41062; ILS 8393) is the modern name for a Latin inscription of the Roman Empire recording a speech given in the late 1st century BC – modern dates range between 9 and 6 BC – by an upper class Roman husband in eulogy of his wife. The speech details the matronal qualities of the wife, her perseverance in the aftermath of her family's death, how she saved the husband during the triumviral proscriptions of the late Republic, and their marriage. The speech was not necessarily given in public but was inscribed and put up around Rome.

Traditionally, following Theodor Mommsen, the deceased wife has been identified as Turia, the wife of the Quintus Lucretius Vespillo who was consul in 19 BC. This identification, however, is no longer widely accepted for lack of corroborating evidence.

== Summary ==
The surviving portions of the laudatio start with a description of events prior the marriage. Substantial portions are missing. This summary ignores missing lines.

After the then-future wife was orphaned by the death of her parents in the countryside, she piously punished her parents' killers, defended her father's property, and lodged with the husband's mother. Even under such circumstances the wife successfully defended the inheritance, though the specific heirs have been disputed, in court against unnamed putative agnates who sought to force the estates into a guardianship. At the end of the civil war she then successfully petitioned Caesar for her to-be-husband's pardon so he could return to Italy.

The husband recites that the marriage lasted 41 years and praises the wife's faithfulness to her husband and his family, her skill at weaving, religious attentiveness, and modest dress. (These were the standard virtues of the Roman matron.) The husband also praises their joint administration of their estates, their good relations with the wife's sister, and the generosity of the families together.

During the proscriptions, the husband was one of the named victims; the wife gave him her jewellery and maintained him while he was in exile or in hiding without giving him up to the enemy. She entreated with the authorities for the husband's pardon and defended his properties, specifically a house purchased at the exile auction for Titus Annius Milo, from gangs who sought to loot it. Her pleas successful with the triumvir Octavian, she also went before Lepidus but was dragged from his tribunal with bruises. The husband commends how she persevered nevertheless to make safe her husband's civic status and thereby saved his life.

With peace restored, the couple desired children but were unable to conceive. The wife, seeking children for her husband, sought her own divorce so she could find for her husband a new wife with which he could conceive, saying that she would treat children of such a union as her own, act as a sister or mother-in-law to this new wife, and allow her husband to take her dowry into the new marriage. The husband refuses this plan, refusing to countenance a divorce from the wife who had so faithfully saved his life during the proscriptions. He regardless extols the generosity of this offer and her devotion to him.

Lamenting the wife's death, the husband wishes that he, who was the older, could have predeceased her and left everything to her. However in this time of grief he says he is strengthened by her memory and her resolve in life. He then promises that he will execute her final wishes faithfully and commends her to the protection of the manes.

== Inscription ==
A bit over half of the original inscription, based on estimates of its size, have been found. The portions of the inscription that would have included the name of the wife and husband, however, have not been found. It is the longest antique Latin inscription, erected by a private individual, that survives. In its original form, the slabs would have each stood 259 centimetres (102 in) high by 84 centimetres (33 in) wide with a depth of 9 centimetres (3.5 in). Made of marble, each slab would have originally weighed around 1.5 tons.

The inscription was erected in two large panels. There are seven extant fragments, assigned letters from A to G. Fragments A–C are from the left panel with the remaining fragments D–G, on the right.

Fragments A and B were also found, respectively in an abbey close to the Theatre of Marcellus and supposedly near the Tomb of Caecilia Metella. Both were transcribed early in the 1700s. Another fragment, C, was discovered and transcribed c. 1600 by Jacques Sirmond but was only identified as part of the laudatio in the 1860s, allowing for most of the inscription to be pieced together. Fragments A–C do not survive in their original form.

The two largest fragments, D and E, were discovered in the late seventeenth century, where it had been used as covering for ditches on the Via Labicana, and entered the collection of Cardinal Alessandro Albani by 1758. Fragments F and G were found, respectively, in 1898 on the Via Portuensis during excavations for a new sewer by Dante Vaglieri and in 1949 at the Museo delle Terme by Arthur E Gordon and wife Joyce.

The different surviving fragments are located in different places at Rome. The opening lines on the right panel, with UXORIS, and Gordon's fragment are housed in the Museo Nazionale Romano at the Baths of Diocletian in Rome. Fragments A–C are not extant in their original form. Fragments D and E are at the Villa Albani.

== Identification ==
The names of the husband and wife are not extant. However, the wife is traditionally identified as Turia, the wife of the consul of 19 BC, Quintus Lucretius Vespillo. This identification was made some time before 1717, but was spread in the 19th century by the historian and epigrapher Theodor Mommsen. This is largely on the basis of similarity with the stories in Appian and Valerius Maximus as to Turia having saved Lucretius from the proscriptions by hiding him in her attic. Mommsen also argued that Lucretius' possible identification as a Pompeian naval commander in Illyria during the Caesar's civil war is consistent with where the laudatio places the absent husband shortly prior to their marriage.

The fragments of the speech, however, are not entirely consistent with a political aristocrat's self-representation; the absence of any mention of a political career suggests it is not the consul ordinarius of 19 BC or any involvement of the couple with politics. Moreover, portions of the inscription suggest a lack of rhetorical training, which further suggests that the husband was not a former consul. The identification with Turia is generally no longer accepted. Modern interpretations of the laudatio view the couple as unknown wealthy equestrians, much in the vein of Titus Pomponius Atticus, who were largely concerned their property and safety.

== Editions ==
Accepted reconstructed texts of the inscription have changed over time. The most recent version in the Corpus Inscriptionum Latinarum was that published, originally, by D. Flach's Die sogenannte Laudatio Turiae in 1991. A translation and extended commentary suitable for a general audience is also available in Josiah Osgood's Turia (2014). Previous scholarly discussions include those of E. Wistrand in The So-called Laudatio Turiae (1976).

== See also ==
- Women in ancient Rome
