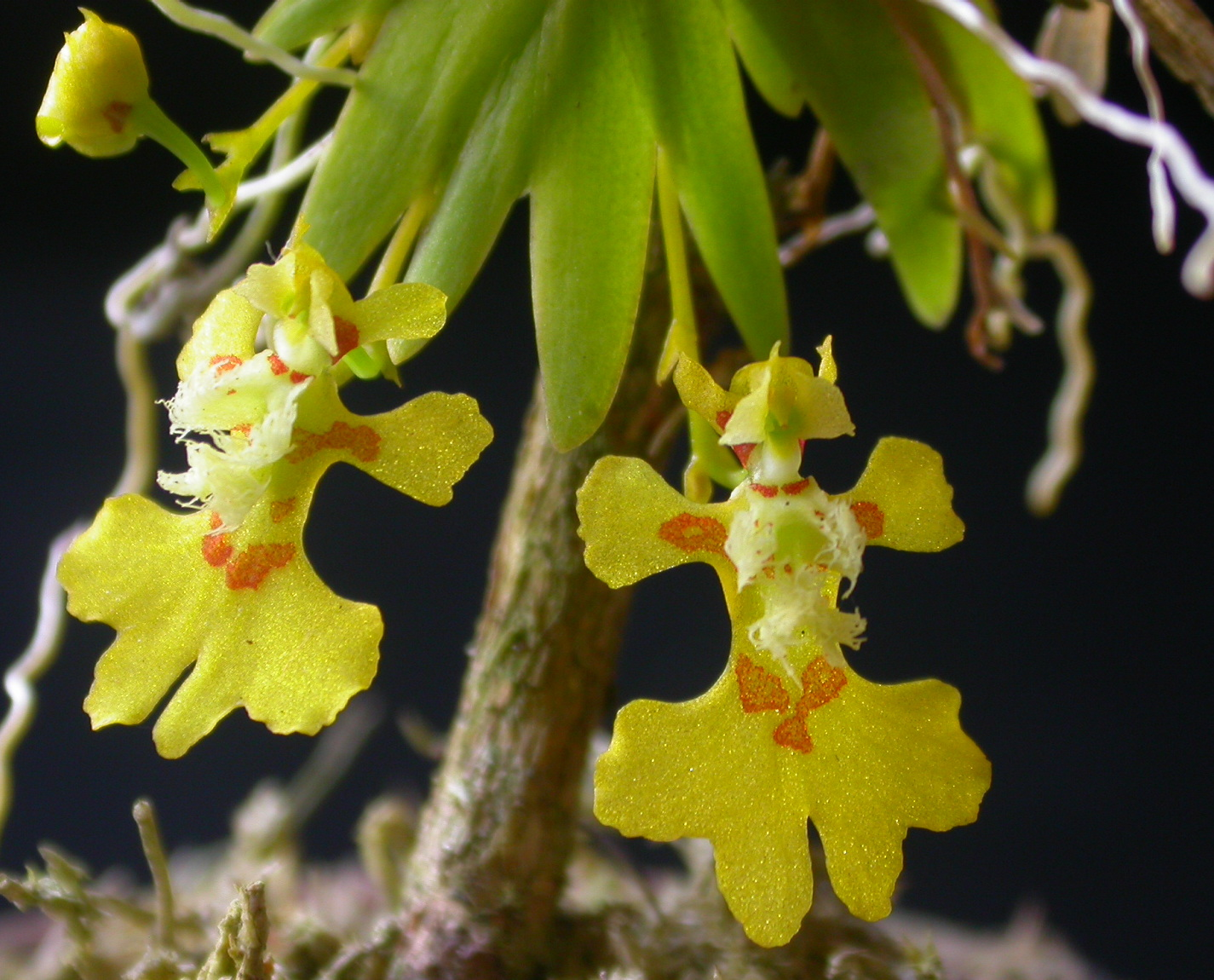
- Erycina glossomystax

Scientific classification
- Kingdom: Plantae
- Clade: Tracheophytes
- Clade: Angiosperms
- Clade: Monocots
- Order: Asparagales
- Family: Orchidaceae
- Subfamily: Epidendroideae
- Tribe: Cymbidieae
- Subtribe: Oncidiinae
- Genus: Erycina; Lindl.

Synonyms
- Psygmorchis Dodson & Dressler; Stacyella Szlach., invalid name

= Erycina (plant) =

Genus of orchids

Erycina is a genus of flowering plants from the orchid family, Orchidaceae. Its species are native to Mexico, Central America, South America and Trinidad.

1. Erycina crista-galli (Rchb.f.) N.H.Williams & M.W.Chase
2. Erycina echinata (Kunth) Lindl.
3. Erycina glossomystax (Rchb.f.) N.H.Williams & M.W.Chase
4. Erycina hyalinobulbon (Lex.) N.H.Williams & M.W.Chase
5. Erycina pumilio (Rchb.f.) N.H.Williams & M.W.Chase
6. Erycina pusilla (L.) N.H.Williams & M.W.Chase
7. Erycina zamorensis (Dodson) N.H.Williams & M.W.Chase

== See also ==
- List of Orchidaceae genera
