= Gaius Junius Silanus (consul 17 BC) =

Roman senator

Gaius Junius Silanus (fl. 1st century BC) was a Roman Senator, who was consul in 17 BC as the colleague of Gaius Furnius.

== Biography ==
The son of an otherwise unknown Gaius Junius Silanus, it is speculated that Junius Silanus was related to Marcus Junius Silanus (perhaps his cousin). Elected consul in 17 BC alongside Gaius Furnius, it has been postulated that he may have been a proconsular governor of Asia around 24/23 BC, but this has been challenged as highly unlikely. He may have been the biological father of Quintus Caecilius Metellus Creticus Silanus. Nothing further is known about his career.

== Sources ==
- Degrassi, Attilio (1952). I fasti consolari dell'Impero Romano dal 30 avanti Cristo al 613 dopo Cristo (in Italian). Roma: Edizioni di Storia e letteratura. OCLC 1149534770.
- Syme, Ronald (1986). The Augustan Aristocracy. Oxford : New York: Oxford University Press, USA. ISBN 978-0-19-814859-3.

Political offices
Preceded by Publius Cornelius Lentulus Marcellinus, and Gnaeus Cornelius Lentulus	Consul of the Roman Empire; 17 BC with Gaius Furnius	Succeeded by Lucius Domitius Ahenobarbus, and Publius Cornelius Scipio
