= Publius Cornelius Lentulus Marcellinus =

Roman Senator and consul

Publius Cornelius Lentulus Marcellinus (fl. 1st century BC – 1st century AD) was a Roman Senator who was elected Roman consul in 18 BC, with Gnaeus Cornelius Lentulus as his colleague. During his consulship, the Senate and the Roman assembly again conferred upon the Roman emperor Augustus his extraordinary promagisterial authority and his Tribunician power.

== Biography ==
Much about the ancestry and career of Publius Cornelius Lentulus Marcellinus is uncertain and is based on a great deal of supposition; what is certain is the praenomen of his father, Publius, which is attested in his filiation. It is postulated that our Marcellinus may have been the son of Publius Cornelius Lentulus Marcellinus, who may have been a Triumvir monetalis in 50 BC, but it is certain he was elected quaestor in 48 BC; Marcellinus the quaestor commanded a portion of Julius Caesar's defences at Dyrrachium which was attacked by Gnaeus Pompeius Magnus, and in the process Marcellinus sustained heavy losses. There is also a Gnaeus Cornelius Lentulus Marcellinus, consul in 56 BC, who is considered the father of the quaestor, who could be the grandfather of our Marcellinus.

There is a fragmentary list of the praetors of 29 BC, which includes a "Cornelius Lentulus Marc[...]", which has led some experts to identify this person with the consul of 18 BC. Ronald Syme notes a number of implications if this identification is correct. One is a long interval elapsed between Marcellinus' praetorship and consulship, which is unusual, especially for a member of the patrician class, which, as Syme observes, "is not inconceivable in the first decade of the new order. On the other hand, perhaps a different Marcellinus." Even more important is Syme's observation, "In any event a praetor of 29 cannot be the son of a quaestor in 48."

It is possible that Marcellinus may be the Cornelius Lentulus appointed Legatus Augusti pro praetore in Pannonia in the first years of the 1st century AD. However, Syme argues that Cornelius Lentulus the general is more likely identified as Gnaeus Cornelius Lentulus Augur, consul in AD 14.

== See also ==
- List of Roman consuls

== Sources ==
- Broughton, T. Robert S., The Magistrates of the Roman Republic, Vol II (1952)
- Syme, Ronald, The Augustan Aristocracy (1986). Clarendon Press.

Political offices
Preceded by Marcus Vinicius, and Quintus Lucretius Vespillo as Suffect consuls	Consul of the Roman Empire; 18 BC with Gnaeus Cornelius Lentulus	Succeeded by Gaius Furnius, and Gaius Junius Silanus
