= Appuleia Varilla =

- Parents: Sextus Appuleius (father); Quinctilla Varilla (mother)
- Relatives: Octavia Major, paternal grandmother
- Family: Julio-Claudian dynasty

Appuleia Varilla (flourished 1st century AD) was a Roman noblewoman and the daughter of Quinctilla Varilla and Sextus Appuleius. She was a grand-niece of the emperor Augustus as her father was the son of Octavia Major.

== Biography ==
=== Early life ===
Tacitus described her as the grand-niece of Augustus. For a long time it was uncertain how exactly she was related to Augustus, with many assuming she was a daughter of Claudia Marcella Major but historian Ronald Syme reports that an inscription from Asia confirms she was the daughter of that consul of 29 BC Sextus Appuleius and a sister of Publius Quinctilius Varus. She had a brother also named Sextus Appuleius.

=== Later life ===
In 17, she was charged by Tiberius with adultery and insulting the Roman empress (his mother Livia) and his step-father Augustus. In the trial she was acquitted of treason, but her adultery was punished. She was exiled from Rome and ordered not to come within 200 miles of the city. This punishment by relatives was traditional in this circumstance. Manlius, her lover, was banned from Italy and Africa Province.

== See also ==
- List of Roman women
