= Sentius Augurinus =

Roman statesman of the 2nd century BC

Sentius Augurinus was a Latin poet of ancient Rome who lived in the time of Pliny the Younger, that is, the 1st century CE.

He wrote short poems, such as epigrams and idylls, which he called poematia, and which were in the style of the poets Catullus and Gaius Licinius Macer Calvus, charming, tender, occasional satirical. He was an intimate friend of the younger Pliny, whom he praised in his verses; and Pliny in return represented Augurinus as one of the finest of poets. One of his poems in praise of Pliny is preserved in a letter of the latter.

He might be the same person as the Quintus Gellius Sentius Augurinus, governor of Macedonia under the emperor Hadrian.
