= Gogo brevibarbis =

Conservation status
- Data Deficient (IUCN 3.1)

Scientific classification
- Kingdom: Animalia
- Phylum: Chordata
- Class: Actinopterygii
- Order: Siluriformes
- Family: Anchariidae
- Genus: Gogo
- Species: G. brevibarbis

Binomial name
- Gogo brevibarbis (Boulenger, 1911)

Synonyms
- Ancharius brevibarbis (Boulenger, 1911); Arius brevibarbis (Boulenger, 1911)

Species of fish

Gogo brevibarbis is a species of catfish in the family Anchariidae. It is commonly referred to as the vaona though this name also refers to Ancharius fuscus. It is endemic to Madagascar where it is only known from the holotype, which is apparently from the Mananjary River basin. Its natural habitat is rivers. It is threatened by habitat loss. It grows to a maximum standard length of 12 cm (4.7 in).
