= Temple of Venus Erycina (Capitoline Hill) =

Temple in ancient Rome

- Location within Rome
- Type: Roman temple
- Location: Regione VIII Forum Romanum

History
- Built: 215 BC
- Built by: Quintus Fabius Maximus Verrucosus

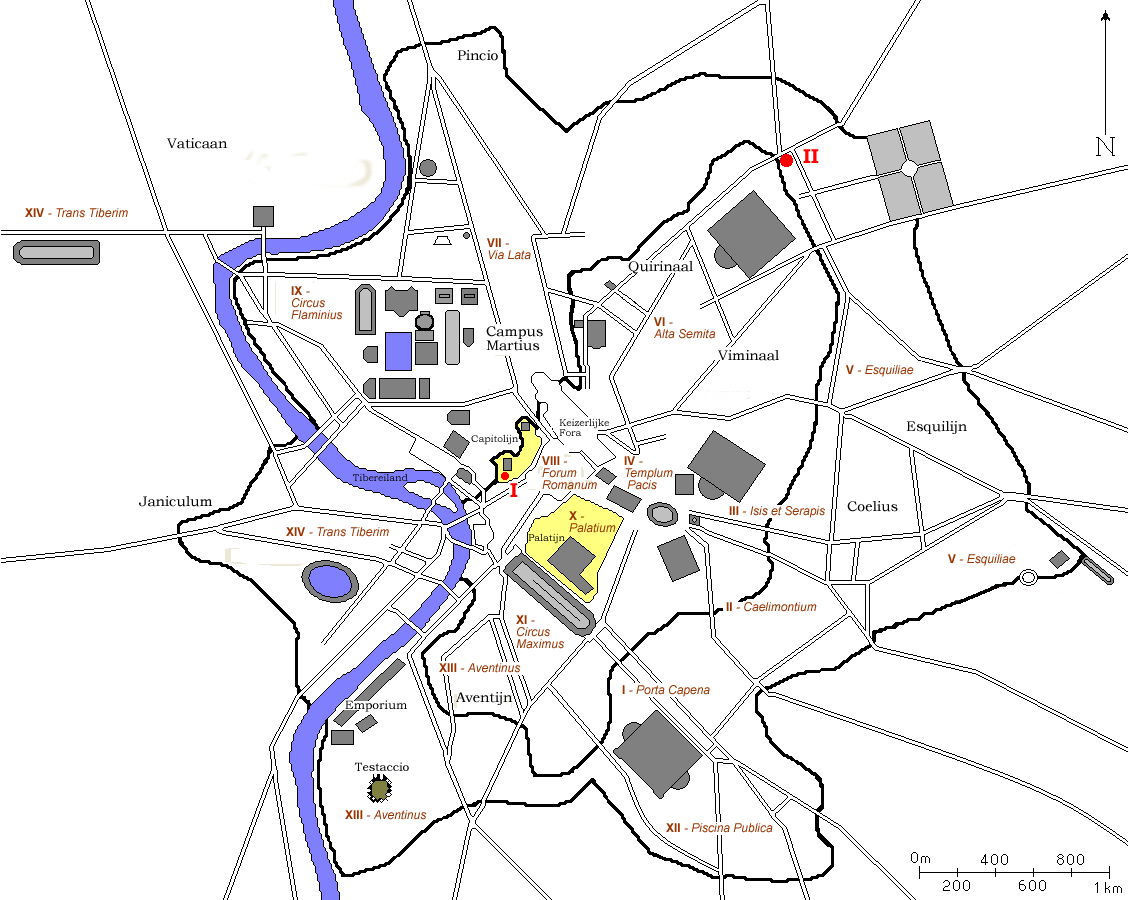
Map of Rome showing the two temples of Venus Erycina

The Temple of Venus Erycina (Latin: Aedes Veneris Erycinae) was a temple on the Capitoline Hill in Ancient Rome dedicated to Venus Erycina. This was an aspect of the goddess Venus. Later this temple was probably called the Temple of the Capitoline Venus (Aedes Veneris Capitolinae). There was another temple with the same name in Rome, the Temple of Venus Erycina (Quirinal Hill).

== History ==
The Temple of Venus Erycina on the Capitoline Hill was built by the dictator Quintus Fabius Maximus Verrucosus. He was appointed dictator after the disastrous Battle of Trasimeno in 217 BC and promised this temple to Venus after consulting the Sibylline Books, hoping thereby to reverse his fate. The temple was inaugurated in 215 BC. Livia Orestilla had Germanicus dedicated in the temple.

The temple was probably in the Area Capitolina, by the great Temple of Jupiter Optimus Maximus.

== See also ==
- Temple of Venus Erycina (Quirinal Hill)
- Temple of Venus Erycina (Erice)
- List of Ancient Roman temples
