= Gaius Furnius (tribune) =

Roman province

Gaius Furnius was plebeian tribune in 50 BC, and a friend and correspondent of Cicero.

Cicero relied on the efforts of Furnius, while tribune, to obtain for him his recall at the end of his first year as proconsul of Cilicia, and, after his return, a supplicatio ("thanksgiving"). A clause, however, which Furnius inserted in his plebiscite, making the recall dependent on the Parthians remaining quiet until the month of August 50 BC, was unsatisfactory to Cicero, since July was the usual season of their greatest activity. Furnius, as tribune, was opposed to the demands that Julius Caesar should immediately and unconditionally resign his proconsulship of Gaul. After the civil war broke out, he was sent by Caesar with letters to Cicero during March 49 BC. Cicero recommended Furnius to Lucius Munatius Plancus, proconsul in Transalpine Gaul for 43 BC, and he was legate to Plancus during the first war between Antony and Octavian; he also informed Cicero of the movements and sentiments of the Roman legions and commanders in Gaul and Spain, but his letters have not been preserved. After the end of the Mutina conflict he served with Plancus until after the Battle of Philippi in 42 BC.

In the Perusine War, 41-40 BC, Furnius took part with Lucius Antonius. He defended Sentinum in Umbria against Augustus, and shared the sufferings of the Perusina fames ("Perusine famine"). Furnius was one of three officers commissioned by Lucius Antonius to negotiate the surrender of Perusia, and his reception by Augustus was such as to awaken in the Antonians suspicions of his fidelity.

In 35 BC he was prefect of Asia Minor, under Mark Antony, where he took prisoner Sextus Pompeius, who had fled there after his defeat by Agrippa in Naulochus (36 BC). After the Battle of Actium in 31 BC, Furnius, through the mediation of his son Gaius Furnius, was reconciled with Augustus received from him the rank of a consular senator, and was afterwards appointed one of the suffect consuls in 29 BC. This is the first time the name of Furnius appears on the consular Fasti. He was prefect of Hispania Tarraconensis in 21 BC.

Furnius is probably mentioned by Tacitus, De Oratoribus 21, among the speakers whose meagre and obsolete diction rendered their works impossible to read without an inclination to sleep or smile.
