= Thomas Stangl =

German classical philologist (1854–1921)

Thomas Stangl (21 December 1854 in Aufhausen – 4 August 1921 in Würzburg) was a German classical scholar and text critic. He is found referenced most often for his edition of scholia to Cicero's speeches (Ciceronis orationum scholiastae), especially for his work on Asconius and the Bobbio Scholiast.

In 1883 he obtained his habilitation for classical philology, and served as an associate professor (from 1900) and full professor (from 1919) at the University of Würzburg.

== Works ==
- Boethiana: vel Boethii commentariorum in Ciceronis topica emendationes ex octo codicibus haustas et auctas observationibus grammaticis (1882), on the commentaries by Boethius on Cicero's Topica; Stangl's dissertation at the Ludwig-Maximilians-Universität München.
- Der sogenannte Gronovscholiast zu elf ciceronischen Reden (1884), the Scholia Gronoviana on Cicero's speeches.
- Orator ad Brutum (1885) and Brutus de claris oratoribus (1886), text with notes in Latin on the works by Cicero.
- Cassiodorus Senator (1887).
- Tulliana et Mario-Victoriniana (1887/88), notes (in German) on Cicero's speeches and the commentaries of Gaius Marius Victorinus, full text downloadable.
- Virgiliana: Die grammatischen Schriften des Galliers Virgilius Maro, auf Grund einer erstmaligen Vergleichung der Handschrift von Amiens und einer erneuten der Handschriften von Paris und Neapel (1891), on Virgilius Maro Grammaticus, full text at Internet Archive.
- M. Tulli Ciceronis De Oratore (1893), an edition of Cicero's De oratore, full text downloadable.
- Bobiensia: neue Beiträge zur Textkritik und Sprache der Bobienser Ciceroscholien (1894), on the Bobbio Scholiast, full text downloadable.
- Tulliana: Der Text des Thesaurus Linguae Latinae zu Cicero de oratore in ausgewählten Stellen besprochen (1898).
- Q. Curti Rufi Historiarum Alexandri Magni (1902), an edition of the extant portions of Curtius Rufus's biography of Alexander the Great, full text downloadable from Google Books, also available through the Internet Archive.
- Pseudoasconiana. Textgestaltung und Sprache der anonymen Scholien zu Ciceros vier ersten Verrinen (1909), anonymous scholia on Cicero's first speech against Verres, formerly attributed to Asconius.
- Ciceronis orationum scholiastae Asconius, scholia bobiensia, scholia pseudasconii sangallensia, scholia cluniacensia et recentiora ambrosiana ac vaticana, scholia lugdunensia sive gronoviana et eorum excerpta lugdunensia (1912, reprinted 1964), edition of Asconius, the Bobbio Scholiast, and other scholia on Cicero's speeches; the value of this edition, which draws on Stangl's earlier work, is indicated by its reprinting 50 years after its initial publication.
- Lactantiana (1915), notes on Lactantius.
