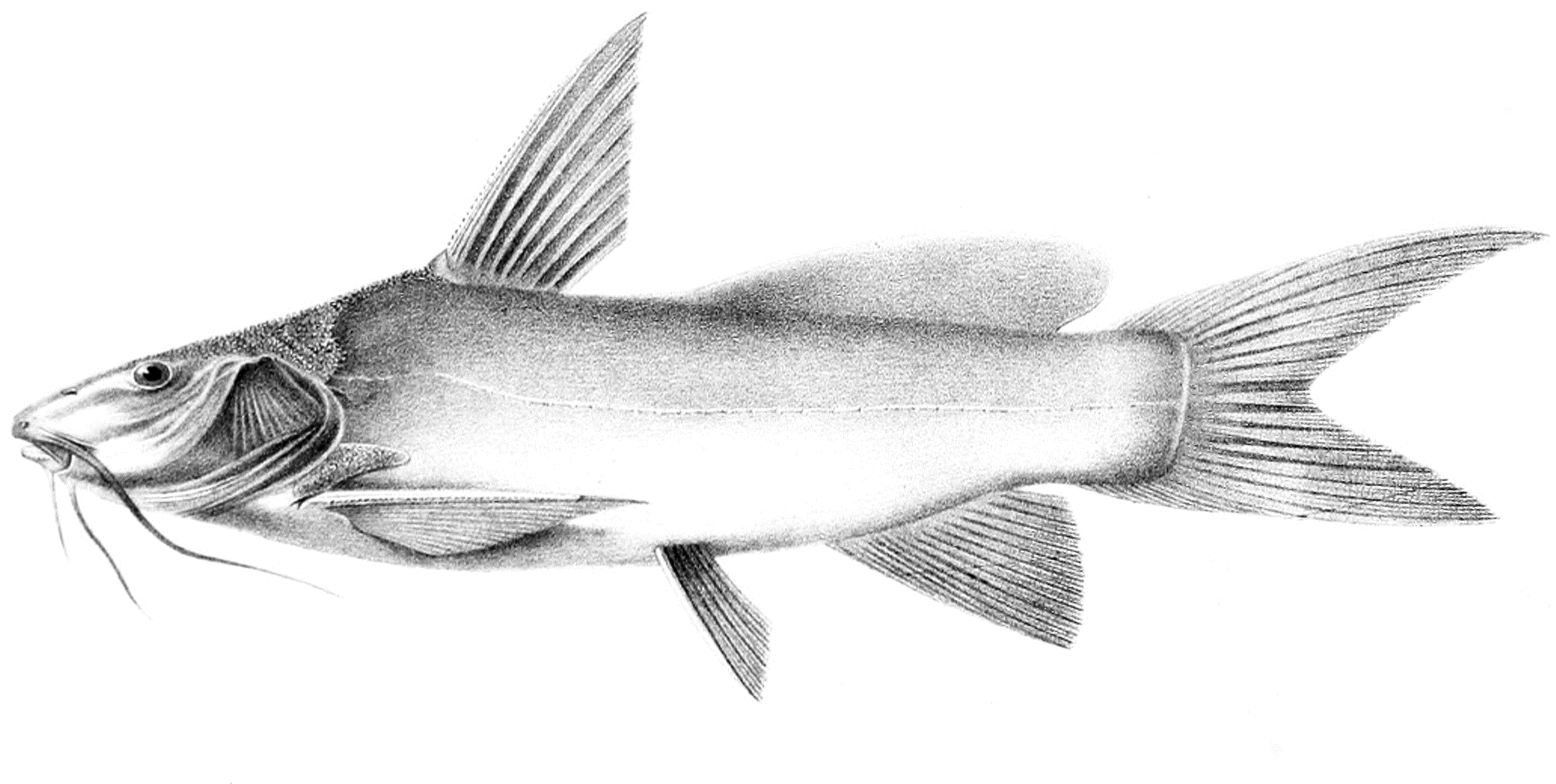

Conservation status
- Least Concern (IUCN 3.1)

Scientific classification
- Kingdom: Animalia
- Phylum: Chordata
- Class: Actinopterygii
- Order: Siluriformes
- Family: Anchariidae
- Genus: Ancharius
- Species: A. fuscus

Binomial name
- Ancharius fuscus Steindachner, 1880

Synonyms
- Arius fuscus (Steindachner, 1880)

= Ancharius fuscus =

Species of fish

Ancharius fuscus is a species of catfish in the family Anchariidae. It is commonly referred to as the vaona but this name also refers to Gogo brevibarbis. It is endemic to Madagascar where it is found in the eastern draining rivers. Its natural habitat is rivers. It is threatened by habitat loss. A. fuscus grows to about 30.0 centimetres (11.8 in) TL.

== See also ==
- Ancharius (fish)
- Ancharius griseus

== Sources ==
- Froese, Rainer; Pauly, Daniel (eds.). "Ancharius fuscus". FishBase. December 2011 version.
