= Sextus Appuleius =

Name of four notable Romans of the 1st century BC and 1st century AD

Sextus Appuleius is the name of four figures during the 1st century BC and 1st century AD. The first Sextus Appuleius was married to Octavia Major, the elder half-sister of Augustus. The three subsequent figures named Sextus Appuleius are respectively the son, grandson and great-grandson of Sextus Appuleius (I) and Octavia Major.

== Sextus Appuleius I (husband of Octavia Major) ==
Date of his birth and death are unknown.

He married Octavia Major, the elder half-sister of Augustus, by whom he had at least one son, also named Sextus Appuleius (II). It is postulated that he had a second son, Marcus Appuleius, the consul of 20 BC.

It is possible that this Sextus Appuleius was Flamen Iulialis.

== Sextus Appuleius II (consul 29 BC) ==
Sextus Appuleius II was son of the above and Octavia Major, the elder half-sister of Augustus. The year of his birth is uncertain, but, based the date of his consulship, was probably very close to 60 BC.

This Sextus Appuleius achieved a number of notable offices during the regime of his half-uncle. He was ordinary consul with Augustus in 29 BC. He then served as proconsul of Hispania in 28 BC, then as proconsul of Asia 23-22 BC. As a result of some unspecified event during this proconsulship he was granted a Roman Triumph in January 26 BC.

He seems also to have served as governor of Illyricum in 8 BC, succeeding Tiberius in that post. He was a member of the college of augurs.

It is likely that this Sextus Appuleius, and not his father, was Flamen Iulialis. It is also just possible that the son succeeded the father to the post (as did the father and son Lentulus Maluginensis to the post of Flamen Dialis).

It has been proposed that the middle-aged flamen on the Ara Pacis is this Sextus Appuleius in his role as Flamen Iulialis.

According to an inscription in the province of Asia, he had married a woman named Quinctilia, who was a sister to the Roman politician and general Publius Quinctilius Varus. By her, he had a son, also named Sextus Appuleius, and a daughter, Appuleia Varilla.

The date of his death is unknown.

Political offices
Preceded by Augustus IV, and Lucius Saenius (suffect)	Consul of the Roman Empire; 29 BC with Augustus V	Succeeded by Potitus Valerius Messalla as Suffect consul

== Sextus Appuleius III (consul AD 14) ==
Sextus Appuleius III was the son of the previous and Quinctilia. This Sextus Appuleius was also a half-great-nephew of Augustus via his father.

His career is largely unknown, except that he became ordinary consul in the year 14. It was during his consulship that Augustus died and was succeeded by Tiberius. As a magistrate, Appuleius was the first to swear allegiance to Tiberius.

He was married to Fabia Numantina, a daughter of either Africanus Fabius Maximus, or Paullus Fabius Maximus and Marcia, a maternal cousin of Augustus (daughter of Atia, his aunt, and his step-brother Philippus). Appuleius and Fabia had one son, also named Sextus Appuleius (IV).

It is assumed Appuleius died not long after 14 because he is not mentioned subsequent to his consulship. His death is not recorded by Tacitus in the surviving part of The Annals, suggesting that it occurred during the period covered in the missing portion of book 5 (i.e. AD 30–31) or after book 6 (i.e. after AD 37). He was survived by his wife Fabia Numantina.

Political offices
Preceded by Aulus Caecina Largus, and Lucius Munatius Plancus	Consul of the Roman Empire; 14 with Sextus Pompeius	Succeeded by Drusus Julius Caesar, and Gaius Norbanus Flaccus

== Sextus Appuleius IV (great-grandson of Octavia Major) ==
The son of the previous and Fabia Numantina.

He was born sometime in the early 1st century, but died young; his tombstone at Luna, set up by his mother, refers to him as "the last of his family" (the Appuleii).
