= Lucius Caecilicus Minutianus Appuleius =

Roman writer who wrote treatises on grammar

Lucius Caecilicus Minutianus Appuleius was a writer of ancient Rome whose surviving works are about grammar. He was commonly acknowledged until the 19th century to be the author of a work de Orthographia, of which considerable fragments were first published by Italian Cardinal and philologist Angelo Mai.

They were republished by Friedrich Gotthilf Osann, with two other grammatical works, de Nota Aspirationis and de Diphthongis, which also bear the name of Appuleius. Danish philologist Johan Nicolai Madvig showed that the treatise de Orthographia was actually a literary forgery, the work of an impostor in the fifteenth century. The two other grammatical treatises above mentioned were probably written in the tenth century.
