= Bartolomeo Borghesi =

19th-century Italian numismatist and antiquarian

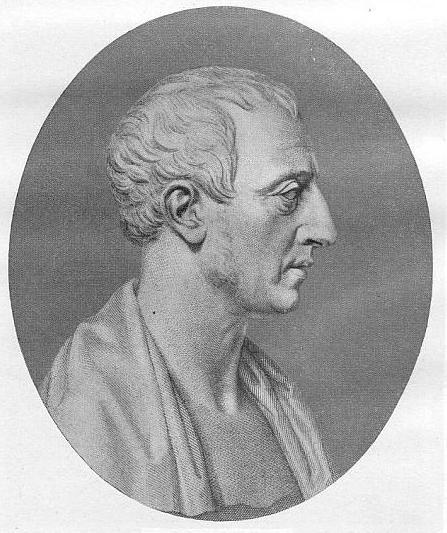
- Born: 11 July 1781; Savignano, Papal States
- Died: 16 April 1860 (aged 78); San Marino, Republic of San Marino
- Occupation: Numismatist, philologist

Bartolomeo (also Bartolommeo) Borghesi (11 July 1781 – 16 April 1860) was an Italian antiquarian who was a key figure in establishing the science of numismatics.

He was born at Savignano, near Rimini, and studied at Bologna and Rome. Having weakened his eyesight by the study of documents of the Middle Ages, he turned his attention to epigraphy and numismatics. At Rome he arranged and cataloged several collections of coins, amongst them those of the Vatican, a task which he undertook for Pope Pius VII. In consequence of the disturbances of 1821, Borghesi retired to San Marino, where he died in 1860.

Although mainly an enthusiastic student, he was for some time podestà of the little republic. His monumental work, Nuovi Frammenti dei Fasti Consolari Capitolini (1818–1820), attracted the attention of the learned world as furnishing positive bases for the chronology of Roman history, while his contributions to Italian archaeological journals established his reputation as a numismatist and antiquarian.

Before his death, Borghesi conceived the design of publishing a collection of all the Latin inscriptions of the Roman world. The work was taken up by the Academy of Berlin under the auspices of Theodor Mommsen, and the result was the Corpus Inscriptionum Latinarum. Napoleon III ordered the publication of a complete edition of the works of Borghesi. This edition, in ten volumes, of which the first appeared in 1862, was not completed until 1897.
