= Bobbio Scholiast =

7th-century anonymous Italian writer

The Bobbio Scholiast (commonly abbreviated schol. Bob.) was an anonymous scholiast working in the 7th century at the monastery of Bobbio and known for his annotations of texts from classical antiquity. He is a unique source for some information about ancient Rome, particularly biographical data and certain details of historical events, and appears to have had access to sources now lost.

Although many commentaries and scholia were produced at the monastery, which was famous for its literary culture and vast library, the label "Bobbio Scholiast" has attached itself mainly to the scholia on a selection of Cicero's speeches.

== Editions ==
- Clark, Albert C, ed. (1895). "Scholia Bobiensia". Pro T Annio Milone ad iudices oratio. Oxford Classical Texts. Oxford: Clarendon Press. pp. 94–118.
- Hildebrant, Paul (1907). Scholia in Ciceronis orationes bobiensia. Leipzig: Teubner.
- Stangl, Thomas (1912). Ciceronis orationum scholiastae. Vol. 2. Leipzig.
