= Roman triumphal honours =

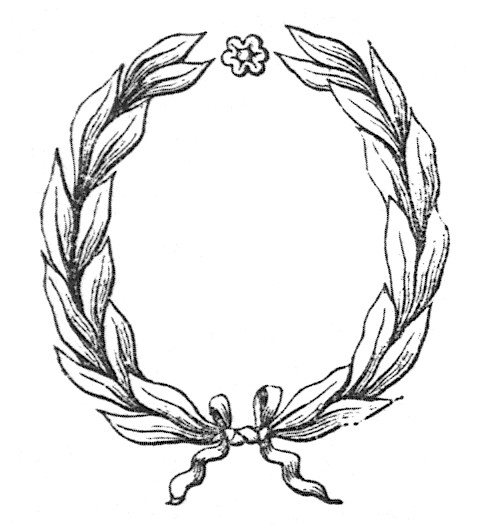
The corona triumphalis (illustration from Meyers Konversations-Lexikon, 1890)

Roman triumphal honours (Latin: insignia or ornamenta triumphalia) denotes honours awarded during the Roman Empire to a victorious general in lieu of a full Roman triumph.

After 14 BC, it became the policy of the founder-emperor Augustus, and of his successors, to grant full Triumphs only to members of their own ruling Julio-Claudian dynasty. As a substitute, victorious generals who were unrelated to the imperial house were awarded insignia (or ornamenta) triumphalia. That is, the dress and privileges traditionally granted to a triumphator, without the elaborate triumphal procession through Rome at the head of his troops.

== Insignia ==
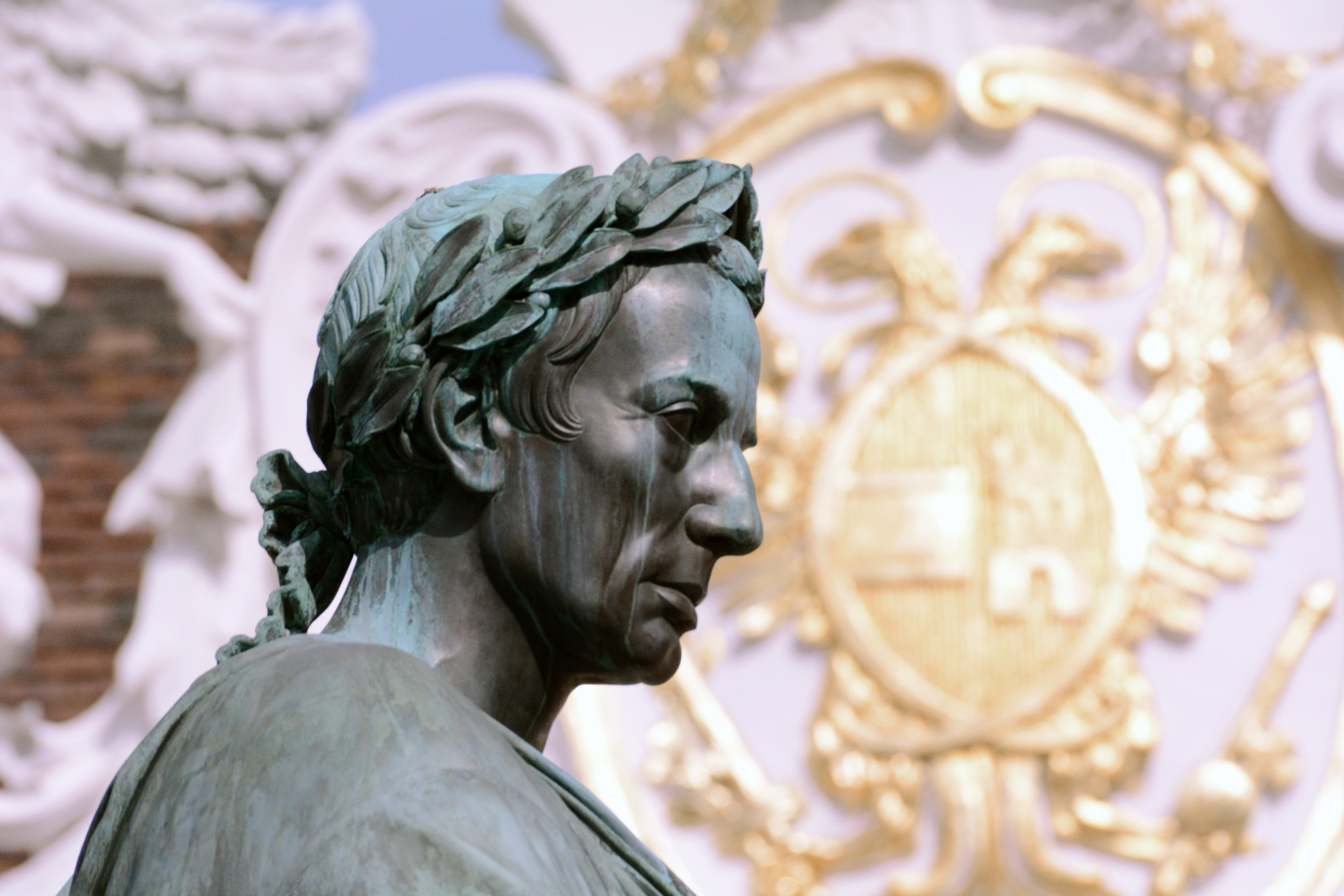
Bronze monument to Francis II, the last Holy Roman emperor, wearing a corona triumphalis and toga

The honours included the right to wear triumphal dress in public: the corona triumphalis (a gold coronet fashioned in the shape of a laurel wreath with dangling gold ribbons); an ivory baton; the tunica palmata (a tunic embroidered with palm-leaves); and the toga picta ("painted toga"), a toga which was dyed entirely purple with embroidered gold border, a robe believed originally to have been the official dress of the Roman kings. The only other Romans entitled to wear these garments were the emperor himself, the two Consuls in office and other magistrates when presiding over games.

In addition, a bronze statue of the beneficiary of triumphal honours was erected in the Forum of Augustus. The beneficiary also had the right to display a further statue of himself in triumphal attire in the vestibule of his own house, which could also be displayed by his descendants.

== Later history ==
Triumphal honours became debased in the latter part of Tiberius' rule and under Nero (r. 54–68), who awarded them to delators (spies used by these emperors to denounce out-of-favour senators for treason), as well as to military victors. But they were restored to distinction by Vespasian (r. 69–79) who had himself been awarded such honors by Claudius during the invasion of Britain. Under the Antonines (98–180), the winners of triumphal honours lost the right to wear triumphal dress, which was now reserved for the Consuls and for the emperors themselves, but retained the privilege of a public statue. Hadrian (r. 117–138) awarded ornamenta triumphalia to Sextus Julius Severus and other generals after the Bar Kokhba revolt.

The bronze monument to Francis II, the last Holy Roman emperor, in the inner courtyard of the Hofburg Palace in Vienna depicts him wearing a corona triumphalis and toga. His facial feature also evoke Julius Caesar.

== See also ==
- Ovation
