= Temple of Venus Erycina (Quirinal Hill) =

Temple of Venus on the Quirinal Hill, Rome

Temple of Venus Erycina (Quirinal hill)
- Location within Rome
- Type: Roman temple
- Location: Regione VIII Forum Romanum

History
- Built: 184 BC
- Built by: Lucius Porcius Licinius

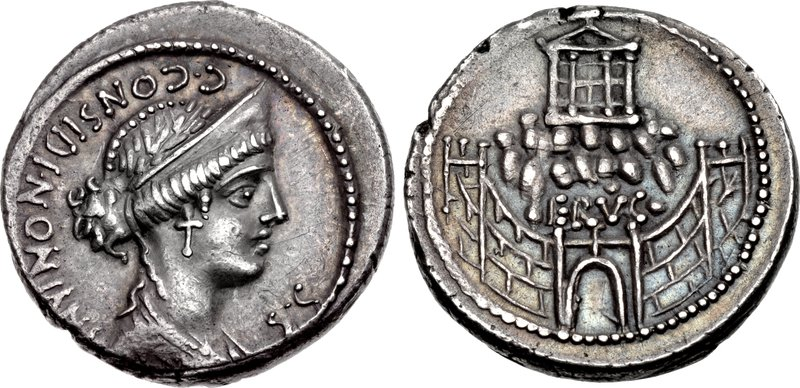
Denarius of Gaius Considius Nonianus, 57 BC. The obverse depicts Venus. The reverse shows the Temple of Venus Erycina.

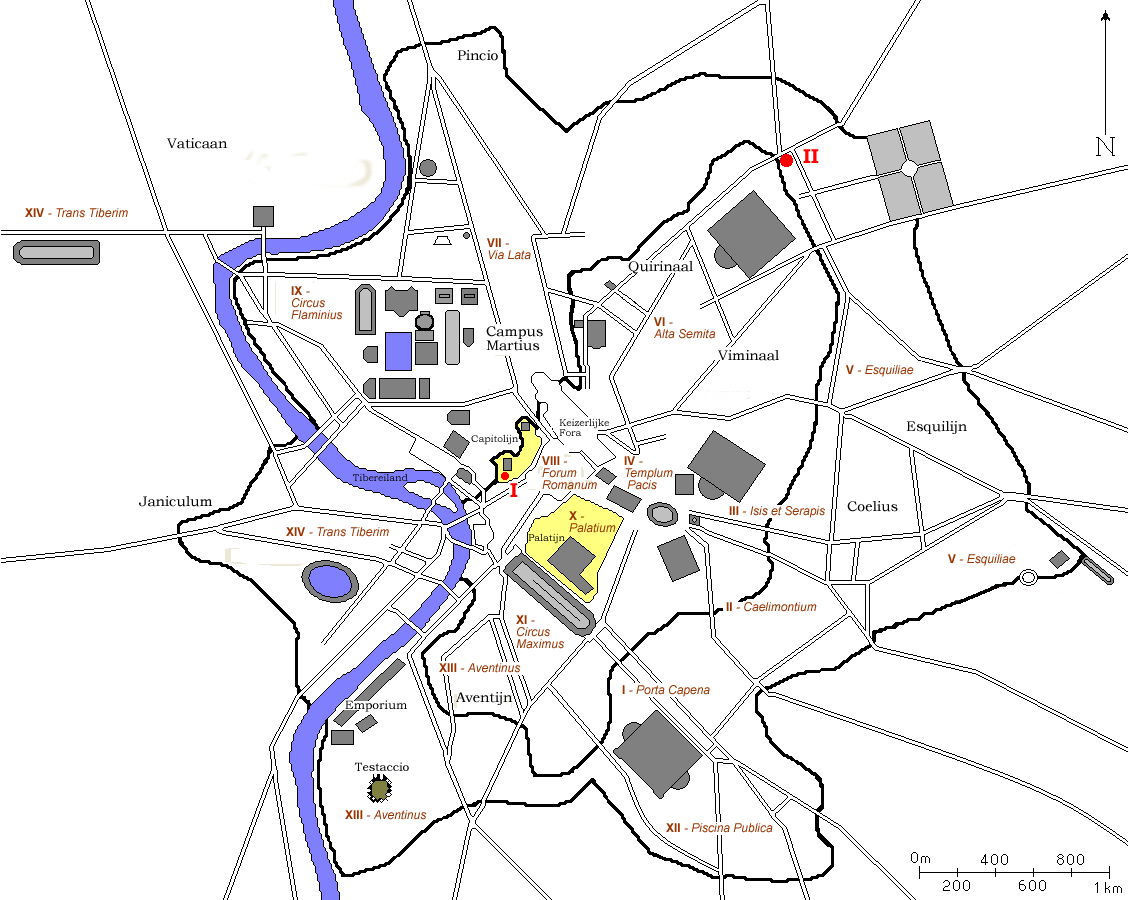
Map of Rome showing the two temples of Venus Erycina

The Temple of Venus Erycina was an ancient sanctuary on the Quirinal Hill in Ancient Rome, erected in 184 BC and dedicated to the goddess Venus.

== History ==
The Temple of Venus Erycina on the Quirinal Hill was built by the consul Lucius Porcius Licinius. He promised the temple to Venus in 184 BC during the war against the Ligurians in the north of Italy. Porcius Licinius (or his younger brother) dedicated the shrine in 181 BC. The temple was possibly included in the 1st century BC in the complex of the Gardens of Sallust. If still in use by the 4th-century, it would have been closed during the persecution of pagans in the late Roman Empire.

== See also ==
- Temple of Venus Erycina (Capitoline Hill)
- List of Ancient Roman temples
