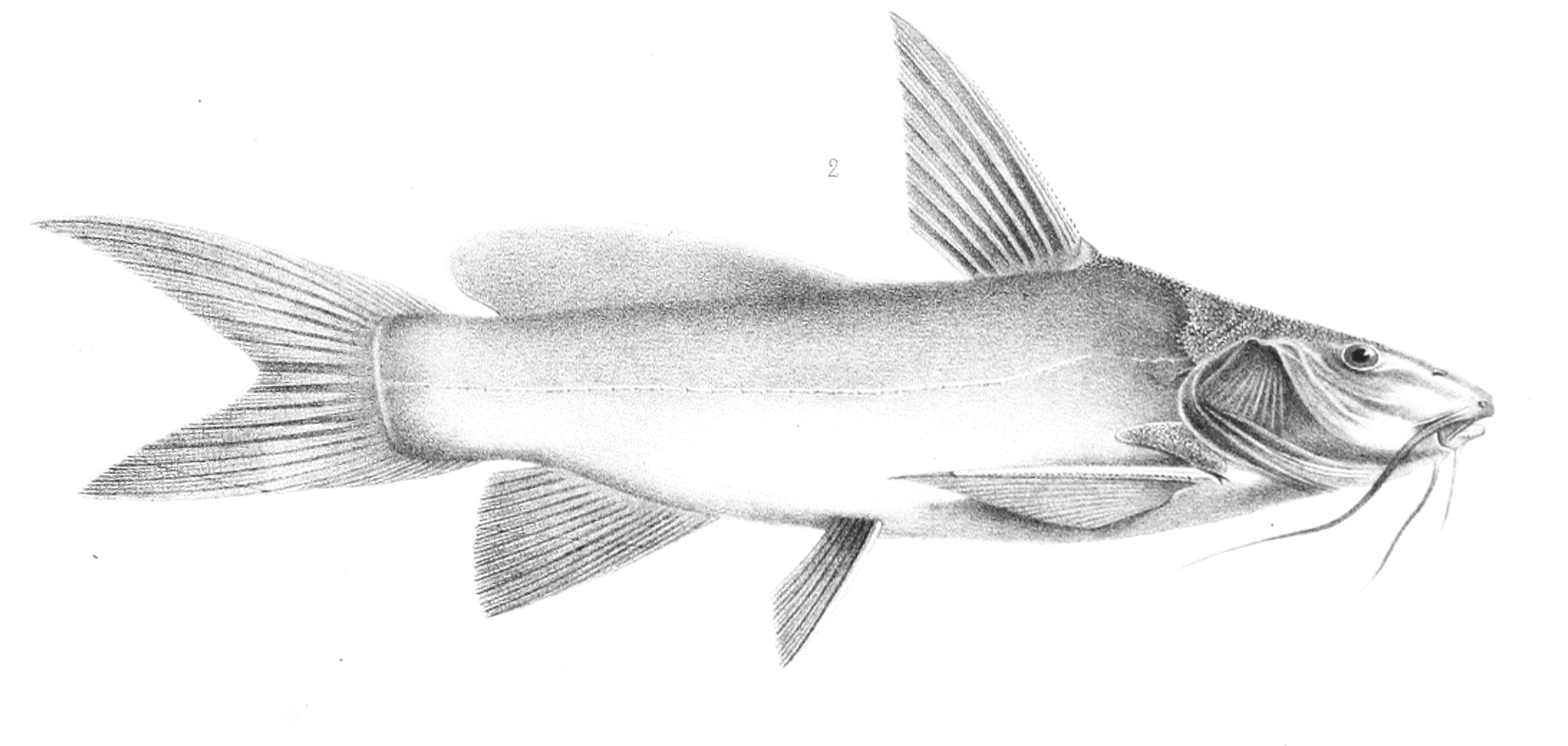
- Ancharius fuscus

Scientific classification
- Kingdom: Animalia
- Phylum: Chordata
- Class: Actinopterygii
- Order: Siluriformes
- Superfamily: Arioidea
- Family: Anchariidae; Glaw & Vences, 1994

Genera
- Ancharius; Gogo

= Anchariidae =

Family of fishes

The Anchariidae are a family of catfishes containing two genera, Ancharius and Gogo with 6 species. Anchariids are a strictly freshwater group endemic to Madagascar. Anchariids are characterized by the presence of fringed barbels and a reduced anterior nuchal plate.

Traditionally, Ancharius is classified in Ariidae. The general consensus in recent years is that anchariids are members of Ariidae and do not warrant family rank. However, this family was recently revised in 2005, which reinstated the separate family for Ancharius and described the genus Gogo.

A molecular analysis grouped Anchariidae with Ariidae under the superfamily Arioidea.
