= Libo =

Libo may refer to:

== Places ==
- Libo County, Guizhou, China
- Loch Libo, Scotland

== People ==
- Libu or Libo, Egyptian term for the people of Libya
- Lucius Scribonius Libo, several men of plebeian status during the Roman Republic and Empire
- Lucius Julius Libo (fl. 267–266 BC), Roman consul
- Marcus Annius Libo (fl. 128–162), Roman consul
- Marcus Livius Drusus Libo (fl. 28–15 BC), Roman consul
- Marcus Scribonius Libo Drusus (fl. 16), accused of conspiring against the Roman emperor Tiberius
- Kenneth Libo (1937–2012), American historian

== Language ==
- Libo or Kaan language, an Adamawa language of Nigeria
- Libo or Palibo language, a Tibetan–Burman language of India

== Other uses ==
- Reeb (beer) or Libo, a Chinese beer brand
- LIBO, Local Internet Break Out. A method to provide internet access locally at the branches instead of backhauling it to a central datacenter.

== See also ==
- Li Bo (disambiguation)
- Libor
