= Temple of Caesar =

Building in the Roman Forum, Italy

Temple of Divus Iulius
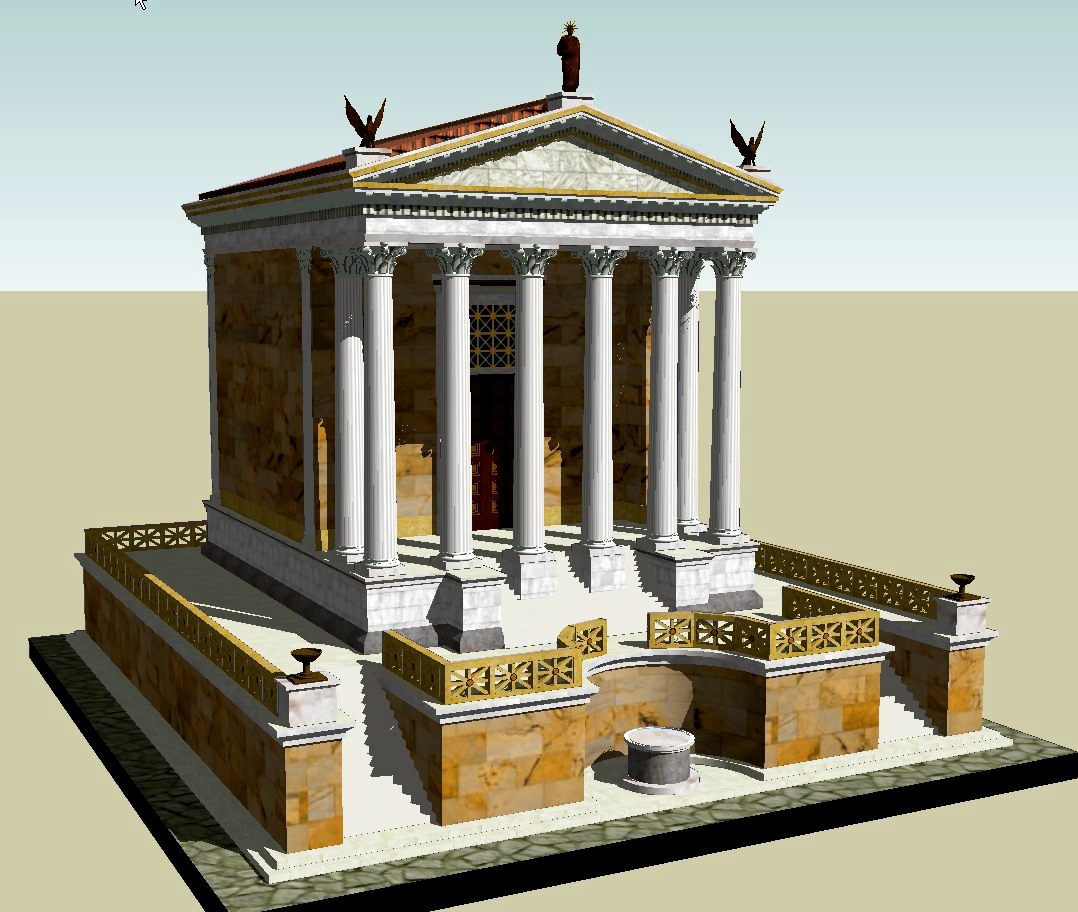
- Perspective view of the Temple of Divus Iulius

- Location within Rome
- Interactive map of Temple of Divus Iulius
- 41.891943°N 12.486246°E
- Type: Temple with, probably, a podium rostra in the frontal part
- Location: Regione VIII Forum Romanum

History
- Built: Inauguration 18 August 29 BC
- Built by: Emperor Augustus

The Temple of Caesar or Temple of Divus Iulius (Latin: Aedes Divi Iulii; Italian: Tempio del Divo Giulio), also known as Temple of the Deified Julius Caesar, delubrum, heroon or Temple of the Comet Star, was an ancient structure in the Roman Forum of Rome, Italy, located near the Regia and the Temple of Vesta.

The remains of Caesar's altar are a pilgrimage site for visitors from across Italy and the world. Flowers and other items are left there daily and special commemorations take place on March 15 to commemorate Caesar's death.

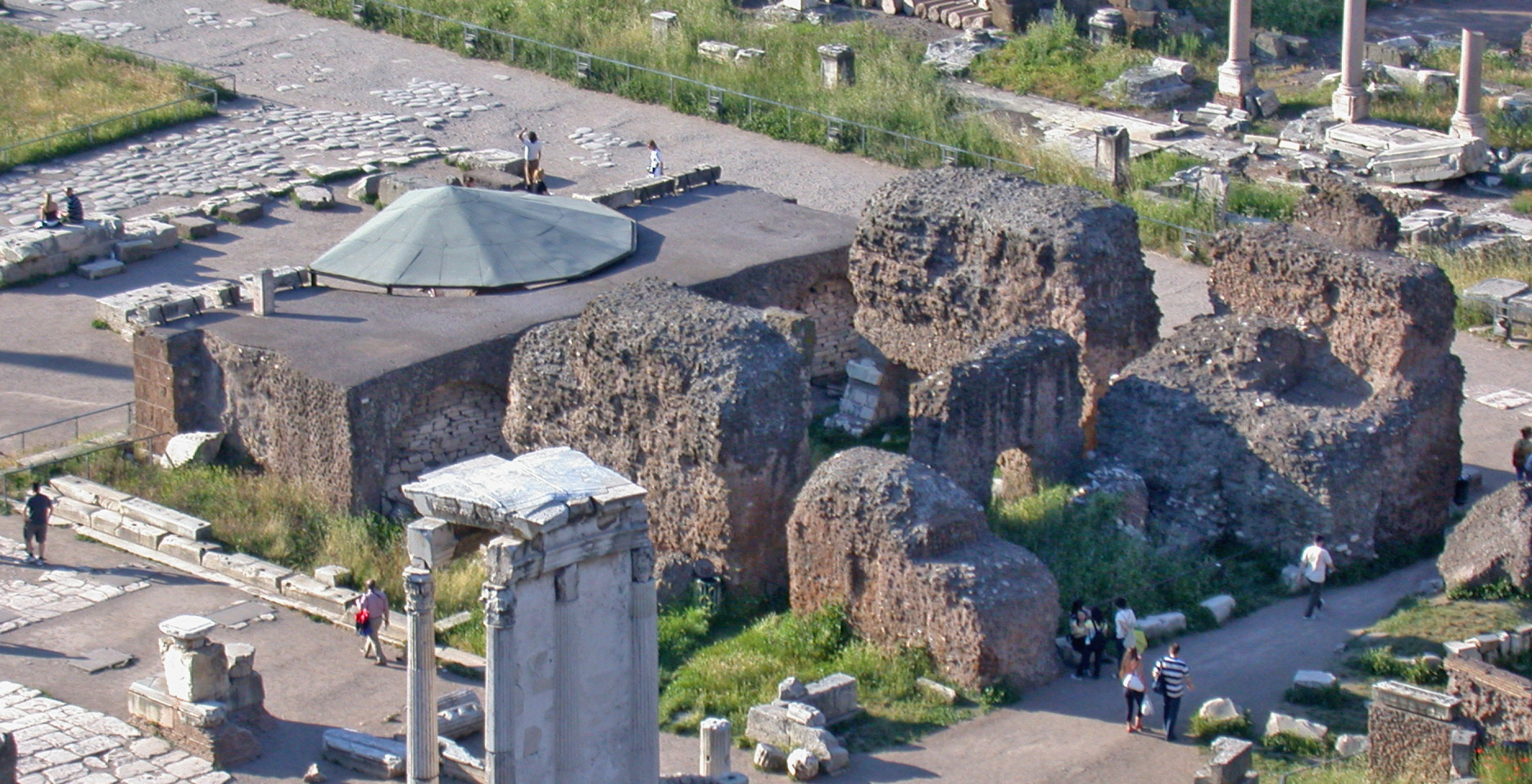
Remains of the temple, seen from the back.

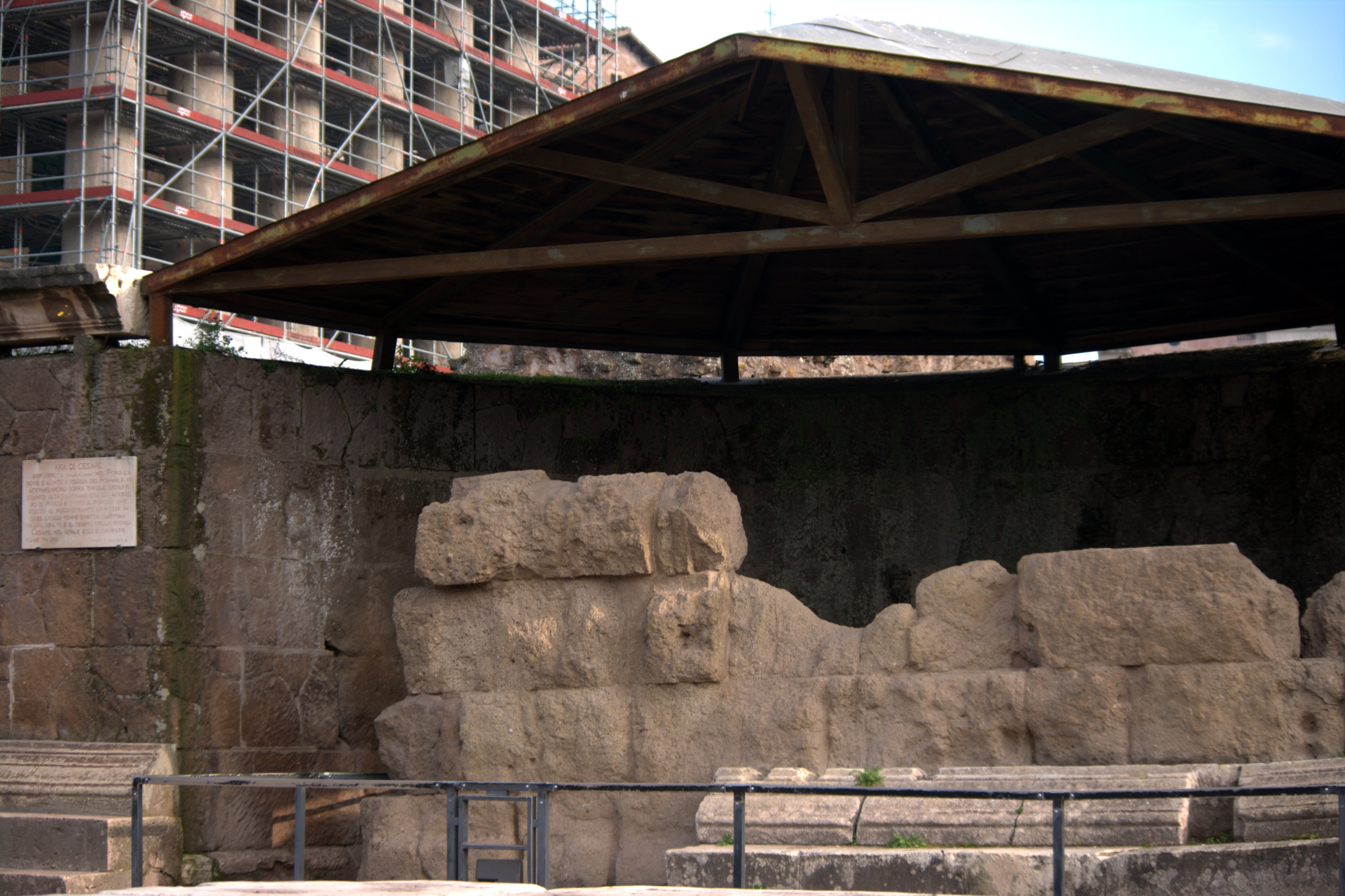
Temple of Julius Caesar

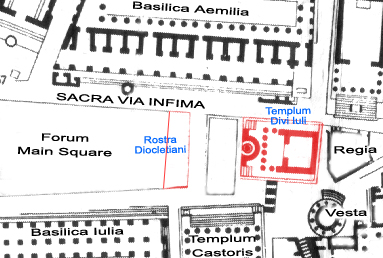
Plan of the Roman Forum. The Temple of Divus Iulius and Rostra Diocletiani are both in red.

== History ==
The temple was decreed by the triumvirs Octavian, Antony and Lepidus in 42 BC after the senate deified Julius Caesar posthumously. However it was completed by Octavian alone: he dedicated the prostyle temple (it is still unknown whether its order was Ionic, Corinthian or composite) to Caesar, his adoptive father, on 18 August 29 BC, as part of the triple triumph celebrating his victory over Antony and Cleopatra. It stands on the east side of the main square of the Roman Forum, between the Regia, Temple of Castor and Pollux, and the Basilica Aemilia, on the site of Caesar's cremation.

Construction may not have begun in earnest until 32 or 31 BC. In any event, the temple was not formally dedicated until 29 BC, after Octavian had defeated his erstwhile partner Antony and assumed sole rulership of the Roman world.

The temple was finally consecrated as part of Octavian's "triple triumph" in 29, celebrating his victories in Dalmatia, Egypt, and at the Battle of Actium.

The temple's roots in Caesarian popular politics were visible in its design. Its high podium provided an excellent speaker's platform, or rostra (known as the Rostra ad Divi Iuli (lit. 'Podium to the Divine Julius') to distinguish it from the Rostra Augusti (lit. 'Podium of Augustus') at the opposite end of the Forum). Like the older rostra it was decorated with the beaks of ships, in this case those taken at the battle of Actium. It faced the long open space of the central forum, which at the time of its construction offered plenty of room for popular gatherings and the erection of grandstands. This platform would be commonly used for imperial eulogies, political addresses, and contiones. Drusus and Tiberius delivered a double speech in the Forum; Drusus read his speech from the Rostra Augusti and Tiberius read his from the Rostra ad Divi Iuli, one in front of the other. The emperor Hadrian delivered what was perhaps a funeral speech from the Rostra ad Divi Iuli in 125 AD, as can be seen on the coin series struck for the occasion. The temple was also used as a legislative voting assembly. The political and religious messages mixed seamlessly: the rostra stood above the circular altar which was the focus of the Caesar cult and which marked the site of Caesar's cremation. The temple thus embodied the Augustan "restoration of the Republic" in a setting that could only remind voters of the Caesarian party and its leader.

The temple functioned as a cult center for the cult of the deified Julius Caesar. Augustus used to dedicate the spoils of war in this temple. The altar and the shrine conveyed the rare right of asylum. After Augustus' death, a festival was held every four years in front of the Rostra ad Divi Iuli in honour of Augustus. The decorations included a famous painting by Apelles depicting Venus emerging from the sea, a nod to the claim of the Julian gens to descent from the goddess. The plan of the temple overall recalled the plan of Caesar's Temple of Venus Genetrix, reinforcing the "family" connection.

It seems that in that very place there was a tribunal praetoris sub divo with gradus known as the tribunal Aurelium, a structure built by C. Aurelius Cotta around 80 BC near the so-called Puteal Libonis, a bidental used for sacred oaths before trials. After the funeral of Caesar and the building of the temple, this tribunal was then moved in front of the Temple of Caesar, probably to the location of the so-called Rostra Diocletiani.

The temple remained largely intact until the late 15th century, when its marble and stones were reused to construct new churches and palaces. Only parts of the cement core of the platform have been preserved.

== Iconography ==
Some months after Caesars' death, a comet appeared in the skies over Rome. The comet was bright enough to be visible in daylight, appearing an hour before sunset for seven consecutive days. The comet's appearance coincided with funeral games sponsored by Octavian on behalf of the assassinated Caesar; popular opinion (helped along, it is believed, by Octavian and the Caesarian party) saw this apparition as proof that Caesar had ascended into the heavens alongside the gods. Inevitably, the comet became known as the sidus Iulium or, in English, "Caesar's Comet."

The comet quickly became a key part of the iconography of the deified Caesar. Pliny the Elder, in his Natural History, quotes Augustus as

"During the very time of these games of mine, a hairy star [comet] was seen during seven days, in the part of the heavens which is under the Great Bear. It rose about the eleventh hour of the day, was very bright, and was conspicuous in all parts of the earth. The common people supposed the star to indicate, that the soul of Cæsar was admitted among the immortal Gods; under which designation it was that the star was placed on the bust which was lately consecrated in the forum."

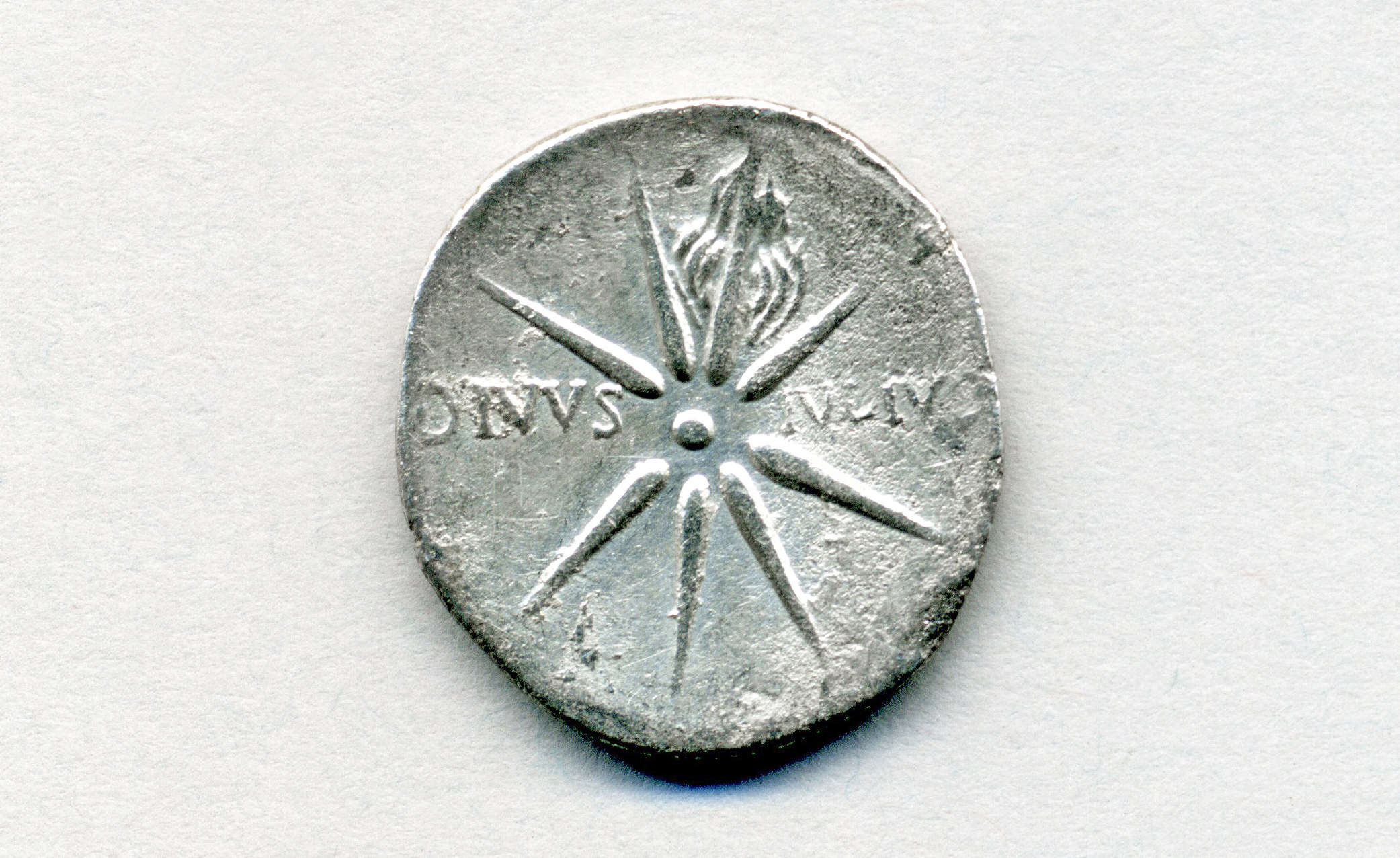
Caesar's Comet as it appears on a coin of Augustus from Hispania, ca. 18 BC

Octavian added a star to the statue of Caesar which he was in the process of erecting on the site of the future temple, and from then on a star became a common graphic motif in allusions to Caesar's divinity. The star was typically shown as an eight-pointed radiate star, sometimes with an additional "flame" marking it as a comet. Coins with this image were quite common under Augustus, but the image continued in use at least until the first century: the last known example is a solitary issue by the Rhine Legions during the confusion of the Year of the Four Emperors.

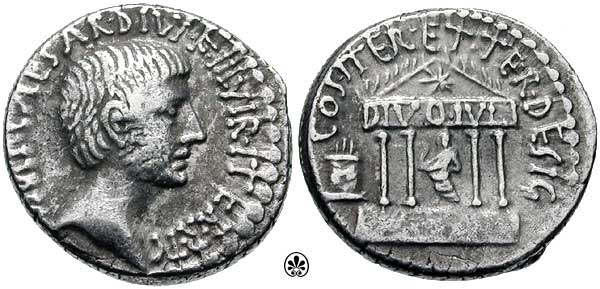
A coin of Octavian, 36 BC, showing an early design of the Aedes Divi Iulii. The final building had six, rather than four columns on its facade but it did include Caesar's Comet on its architrave. The figure inside the temple is dressed as a Roman augur: it may represent Augustus himself rather than Julius Caesar. The altar at left represents the original altar built on the spot of Caesar's cremation, whose foundation is still visible in the Roman forum.

It was sufficiently important to the visual identity of the Aedes Divi Iulii that Pliny described the building as "a temple dedicated to a comet." A coin issued in 36 BC (seven years before the dedication of the temple, presumably representing an early design) showed a tetrastyle temple with a start in its pediment and the inscription DIVO IUL on its tympanum. The final version of the temple included a statue of Caesar accompanied by a star: this may have been the statue first erected in 44 or a new one reflecting a similar iconographic program. The position of the temple on its high pedestal, looking down onto the forum and symbolically proclaiming the presence of the deified Julius, was a pointed reminder to the crowds in the forum of the connection between the new imperial order and Caesar's legacy.

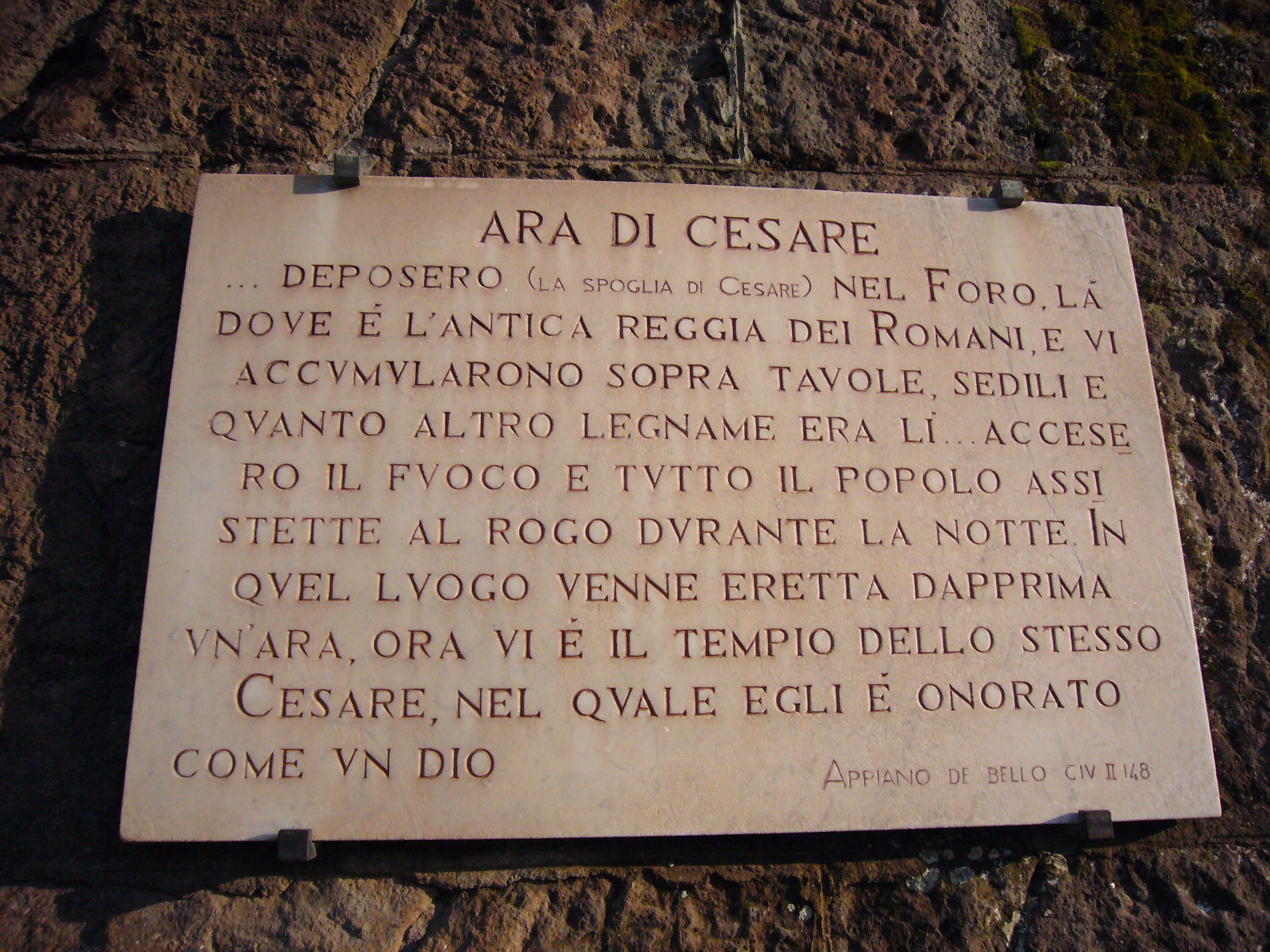
Commemorative plaque beside Caesar's altar.

== Architecture ==
The plan of this temple is missing in the Imperial Forma Urbis. The remaining fragments for this area of the Roman Forum are on slabs V-11, VII-11, VI-6 and show plans of the Regia, the Temple of Castor and Pollux, the Fons and Lacus Iuturnae, the Basilica Iulia and the Basilica Aemilia. Vitruvius wrote that the temple was an example of a pycnostyle front porch, with six closely spaced columns on the front.

The arrangement of the columns, however, is uncertain, as it could be either prostyle or peripteral. The column order originally used for this temple is uncertain. Ancient coins with representations of the Temple of Divus Iulius suggest the columns were either Ionic or composite, but fragments of Corinthian pilastre capitals have been found on the site by archaeologists. Some scholars hypothesize that the temple had an Ionic pronaos combined with Corinthian pilasters on the cella walls, i.e., at the corners of the cella; other scholars consider the temple to have been entirely Corinthian and the coin evidence as bad representations of Corinthian columns. The distinction between Corinthian and composite columns is a Renaissance one and not an Ancient Roman one. In Ancient Rome Corinthian and composite were part of the same order. It seems that the composite style was common on civil buildings and Triumphal arch exteriors and less common on temple exteriors. Many temples and religious buildings of the Augustan Age were Corinthian, such as the Temple of Mars Ultor, the Maison Carrée in Nîmes, and others.

The temple was destroyed by fire during the reign of Septimius Severus and then restored. Comparisons with coins from the times of Augustus and Hadrian suggest the possibility that the order of the temple was changed during the restoration by Septimius Severus. The entablature and the cornice found on the site have a modillions and roses structure typical of the Corinthian order.

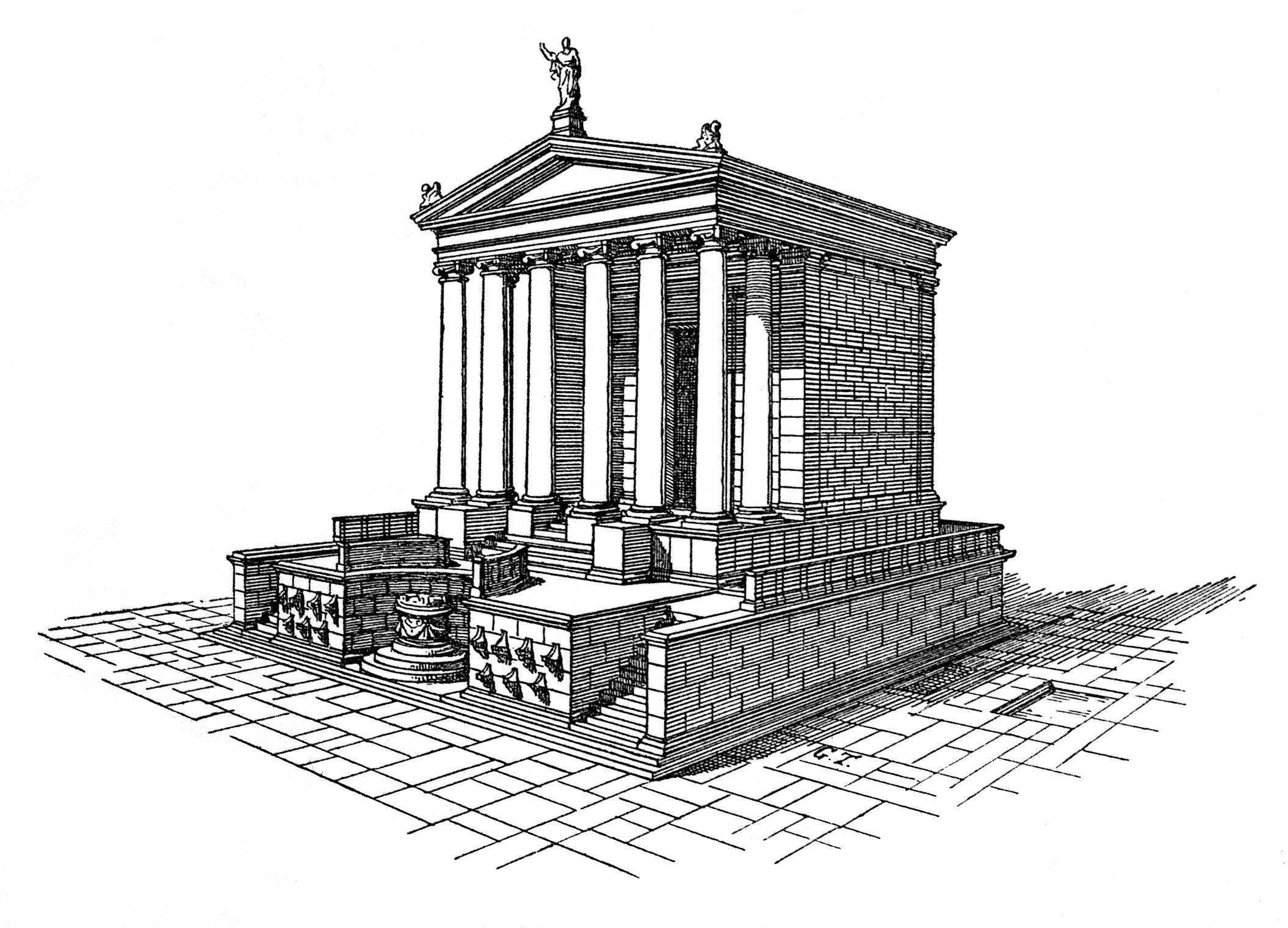
Reconstruction of the Temple of Divus Iulius according to Christian Hülsen

The original position of the staircase of the podium remains uncertain. It may have been at the front and sides of the podium, or at the rear and sides of the podium . The position at the rear is a reconstruction model based on a hypothesized similarity between this temple and the Temple of Venus Genetrix in the Forum of Caesar. This similarity is not proved and merely based on the fact that during the public funeral and Mark Antony's speech the body of Julius Caesar was set on an ivory couch and in a gilded shrine modelled on the Temple of Venus Genetrix. The front position is based on some evidence from 19th century excavations and on an overall impression of the actual site, and on the depictions on ancient coins.

=== Rostra ===
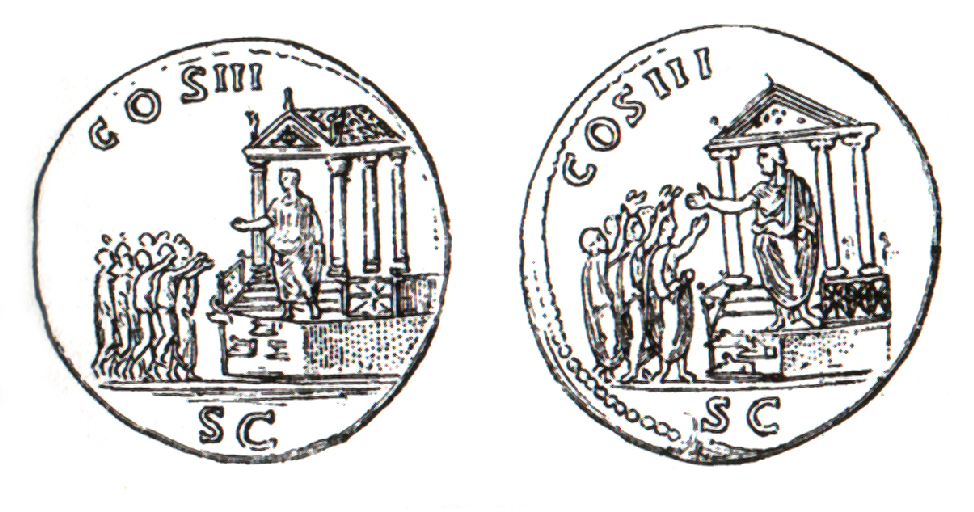
Hadrian-period coin from 125 AD – 128 AD, with representation of the Temple of Divus Iulius. Visible are the Rostra ad Divi Iuli, the arrangement of the podium, and the temple.

Dio Cassius reports the attachment of a rostra from the battle of Actium to the podium. The so-called Rostra ad Divi Iuli was a podium used by orators for official and civil speeches and especially for Imperial funeral orations. The podium is clearly visible on coins from the Hadrian period and in the Anaglypha Traiani, but the connection between the rostra podium and the temple structure is not evident.

Also in this case there are many different hypothetical reconstructions of the general arrangement of the buildings of this part of the Roman Forum. According to one, the Rostra podium was attached to the Temple of Divus Iulius and is actually the podium of the Temple of Divus Iulius with the rostra (the prow of a warship) attached in a frontal position. According to other reconstructions, the Rostra podium was a separate platform built west of the temple of Divus Iulius and directly in front of it, so the podium of the Temple of Divus Iulius was not the platform used by the orators for their speeches and not the platform used to attach the prows of ships taken at Actium. This separate and independent podium or platform, known as Rostra ad Divi Iuli, is also called Rostra Diocletiani, due to the final arrangement of the building.

=== Upper decoration of the frontal pediment ===
From an analysis of ancient coins it is possible to determine two different series of decorations for the upper part of the frontal pediment of the temple. Fire tongues (their identification is uncertain) decorated the pediment, as in Etruscan decorated antefixes, similar to the decoration of the Temple of Jupiter on the Capitoline Hill. The fire tongues perhaps recalled the flames of the comet (star) on Augustan period coins. With a star as the main decoration of the tympanum, as can be seen on the Augustan coins, the whole temple had the function to represent the comet (star) that announced the deification of Julius Caesar and the reign of Augustus, as reported by Pliny the Elder.

A statue at the vertex of the frontal pediment and two statues at the end corners of the pediment, the classical decoration for the pediments of the Roman temples, date to Hadrian's reign.

Other Augustan era buildings with that particular type of Etruscan-style decoration appear on coins, as well as on representation of the frontal section of the Curia.

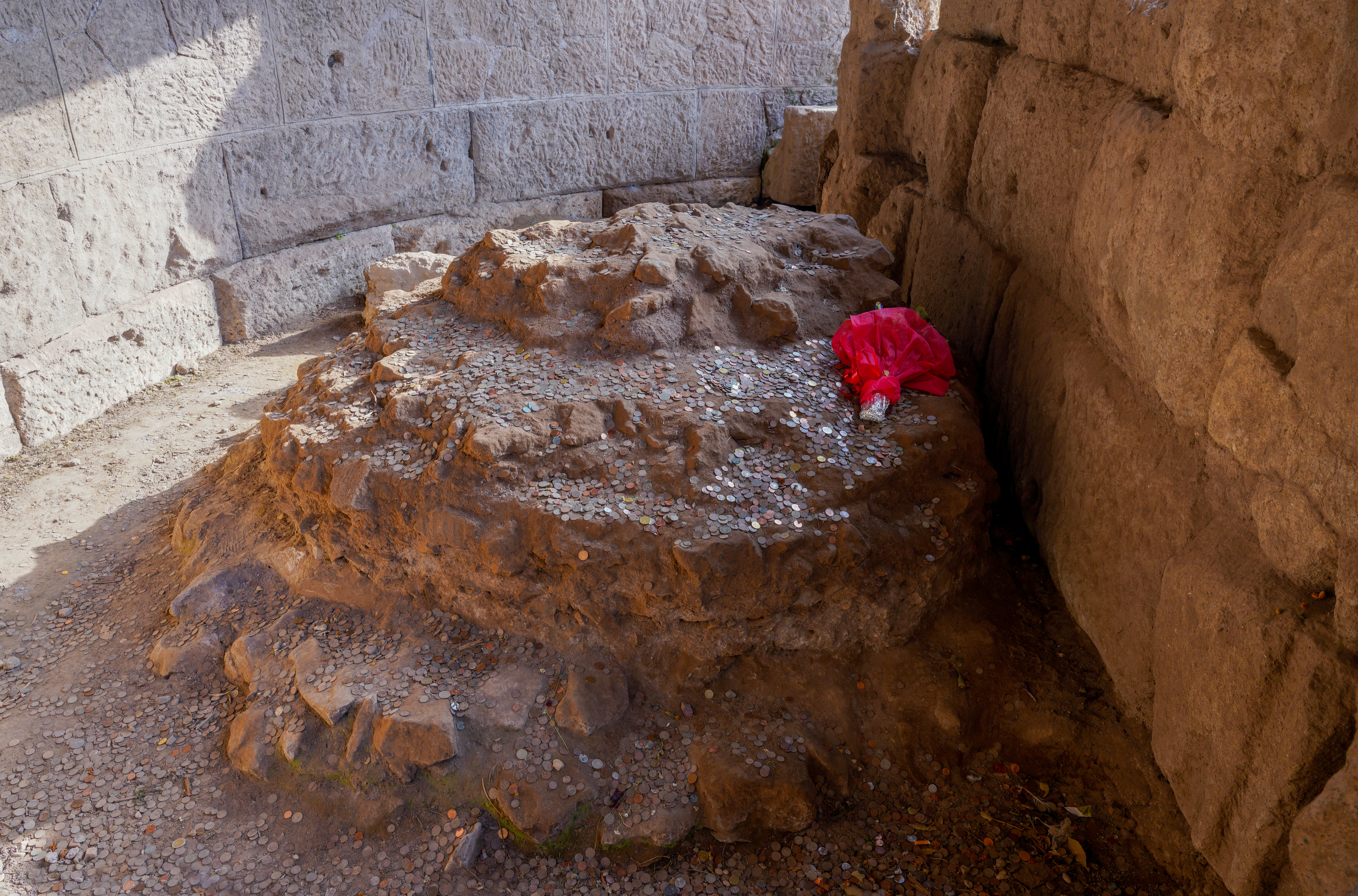
Flowers placed on the remains of the altar of Julius Caesar.

=== The niche and the altar ===
The niche and the altar in front of the temple podium are also a problem of interpretation based on scarce data. They were visible in 29 BC when the temple was dedicated and when Augustus' coin series with the temple of Divus Iulius was struck from 37 BC to 34 BC. For the period after the coinage of that series there is no clear evidence. It is known that at some time the altar was removed and the niche filled in and closed with stones to create a continuous wall at the podium of the temple. According to various hypotheses this was done either in 14 BC, or probably before the 4th century AD, or after Constantine I or Theodosius I, due to religious concerns about the pagan cult of the emperor.

Richardson and other scholars hypothesize that the filled in niche may have not been the altar of Julius Caesar, but the Puteal Libonis, the old bidental used during trials at the Tribunal Aurelium for public oaths. According to C. Hülsen the circular structure visible under the Arch of Augustus is not the Puteal Libonis, and other circular elements covered in travertine near the Temple of Caesar and the Arcus Augusti are too recent to belong to the Augustan era.

=== Measurements ===
The temple measured 26.97 metres (88.5 ft) in width and 30 metres (98 ft) in length, corresponding to 91 by 102 Roman feet. The podium or platform area was at least 5.5 m high (18 Roman feet) but only 3.5 m at the front. The columns, if Corinthian, were probably 11.8 to 12.4 m high, corresponding to 40 or 42 Roman feet.

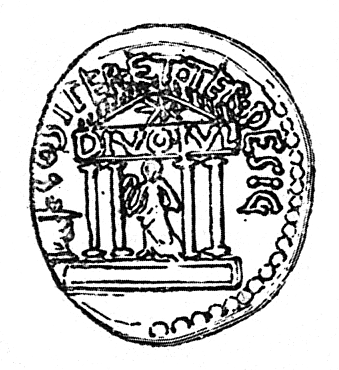
Augustus-era coin from 37 BC – 34 BC with a representation of the Temple of Divus Iulius. Visible are the altar, a statue of Caesar veiled and with a lituus, and a star in the tympanum.

=== Materials ===
- Tuff (inner parts of the building)
- Opus caementicium (inner parts of the building)
- Travertine (walls of the podium and the cella)
- Marble (podium revetement, columns, entablature and pediment of the temple; probably marble from Luni, i.e., Carrara marble)

=== Decoration and position of the remains ===
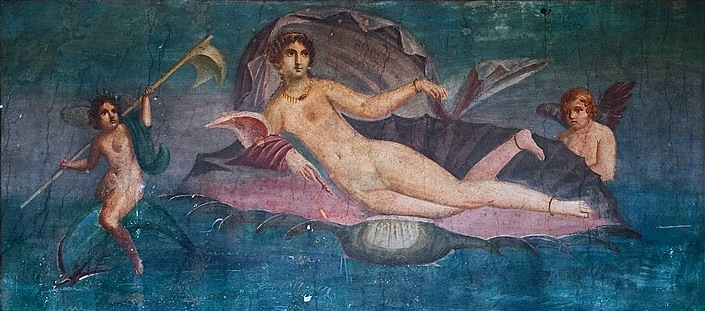
A Pompeian fresco of Venus Anadyomene, probably a copy of Apelles' depiction of Alexander the Great's mistress Campaspe as Venus, a work kept in the Temple of Divus Iulius after Augustus dedicated it to the shrine of Caesar.

The frieze was a repetitive scroll pattern with female heads, gorgons and winged figures. The tympanum, at least during the first years, probably showed a colossal star, as can be seen on the Augustan coins.

The cornice had dentils and beam type modillions (one of the first examples ever in Roman temple architecture) and undersides decorated with narrow rectangular panels carrying flowers, roses, disks, laurel crowns and pine-cones. Remnants of the decorations, including elements of a Victory representation and floral ornaments, are visible on site or in the Forum Museum (Antiquarium Forense).

=== Interior ===
Augustus used the temple to dedicate offerings of the spoils of war. It contained a colossal statue of Julius Caesar, veiled as Pontifex Maximus, with a star on his head and bearing the lituus augural staff in his right hand. When the doors of the temple were left open, it was possible to see the statue from the Roman Forum's main square. In the cella of the temple there was a famous painting by Apelles of Venus Anadyomene. During the reign of Nero Apelles' painting deteriorated and could not be restored, so the emperor substituted for it another one by Dorotheus. There is also another painting by Apelles, depicting the Dioscuri with Victoria.

== See also ==
- List of Ancient Roman temples
