= Bident =

Two-pronged implement resembling a pitchfork

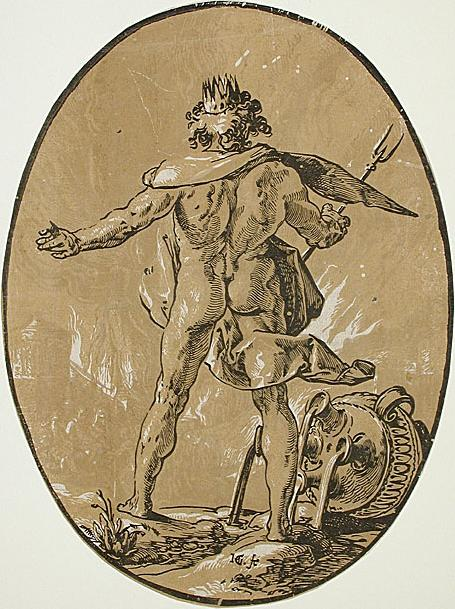
Pluto holding a bident in a woodcut from the Gods and Goddesses series of Hendrick Goltzius (1588–1589)

A bident is a two-pronged implement resembling a pitchfork.

== Etymology ==
The word 'bident' was brought into the English language before 1871, and is derived from the Latin bidentis, meaning "having two teeth (or prongs)."

== Historical uses ==
Ancient Egyptians used a bident as a fishing tool, sometimes attached to a line and sometimes fastened with flight feathers. Two-pronged weapons mainly of bronze appear in the archaeological record of ancient Greece.

In Roman agriculture, the bidens (genitive bidentis) was a double-bladed drag hoe or two-pronged mattock, although a modern distinction between "mattock" and "rake" should not be pressed. It was used to break up and turn ground that was rocky and hard. The bidens is pictured on mosaics and other forms of Roman art, as well as tombstones to mark the occupation of the deceased.

== In mythology ==
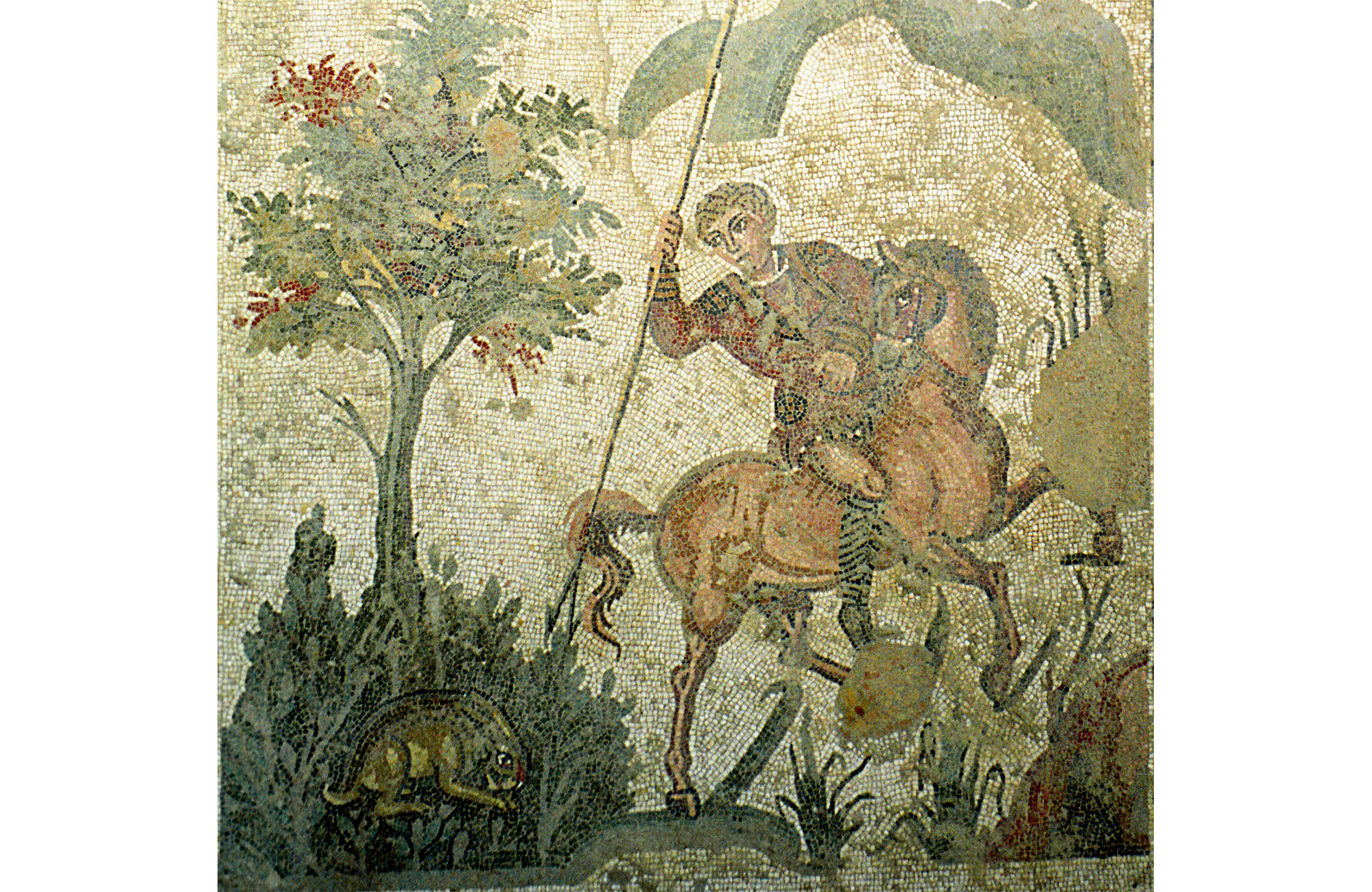
Roman-era mosaics show the bident for hare hunting (Villa Romana del Casale, Sicily, c. 300 AD)

The spear of Achilles is said by a few sources to be bifurcated. Achilles had been instructed in its use by Peleus, who had in turn learned from the centaur Chiron. The implement may have associations with Thessaly. A black-figured amphora from Corneto (Etruscan Tarquinia) depicts a scene from the hunt for the Calydonian boar, part of a series of adventures that took place in the general area. Peleus is accompanied by Castor, who is attacking the boar with a two-pronged spear.

A bronze trident found in an Etruscan tomb at Vetulonia seems to have had an adaptable center prong that could be removed for use as a bident. A kylix found at Vulci in ancient Etruria was formerly interpreted as depicting Pluto (Greek: Πλούτων Plouton) with a bident. A black-bearded man holding a peculiarly two-pronged instrument reaches out in pursuit of a woman, thought to be Persephone. The vase was subjected to improper reconstruction, however, and the couple are more likely Poseidon and Aethra. On Lydia coins that show Plouton abducting Persephone in his four-horse chariot, the god holds his characteristic scepter, the ornamented point of which has sometimes been interpreted as a bident. Other visual representations of the bident on ancient objects appear to have been either modern-era reconstructions, or in the possession of figures not securely identified as the ruler of the underworld.

The Cambridge ritualist A.B. Cook saw the bident as an implement that might be wielded by Jupiter, the chief god of the Roman pantheon, in relation to Roman bidental ritual, the consecration of a place struck by lightning by means of a sacrificial sheep, called a bidens because it was of an age to have two teeth. In the hands of Jupiter (also known as Jove, Etruscan Tinia), the trident or bident thus represents a forked lightning bolt. In ancient Italy, thunder and lightning were read as signs of divine will, wielded by the sky god Jupiter in three forms or degrees of severity (see manubia). The Romans drew on Etruscan traditions for the interpretation of these signs. A tile found at Urbs Salvia in Picenum depicts an unusual composite Jove, "fairly bristling with weapons": a lightning bolt, a bident, and a trident, uniting the realms of sky, earth, and sea, and representing the three degrees of ominous lightning (see also Summanus). Cook regarded the trident as the Greek equivalent of the Etruscan bident, each representing a type of lightning used to communicate the divine will; since he accepted the Lydian origin of the Etruscans, he traced both forms to the same Mesopotamian source.

The later notion that the ruler of the underworld wielded a trident or bident can perhaps be traced to a line in the Hercules Furens ("Hercules Enraged") of Seneca. Dis (the Roman equivalent of Greek Plouton) uses a three-pronged spear to drive off Hercules as he attempts to invade Pylos. Seneca also refers to Dis as the "Infernal Jove" or the "dire Jove", the Jove who gives dire or ill omens (dirae), just as in the Greek tradition, Hades is sometimes identified as a "chthonic Zeus". That the trident and bident might be somewhat interchangeable is suggested by a Byzantine scholiast, who mentions Poseidon being armed with a bident.

== In art ==
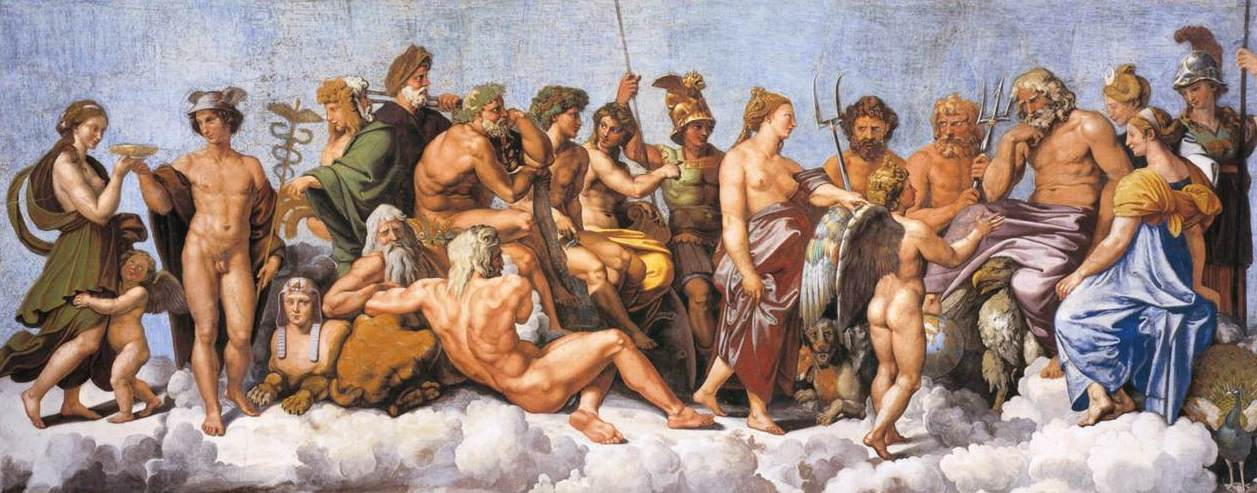
Council of the gods from the Loggia di Psiche, Villa Farnesina, with Pluto holding a bident and Neptune a trident

In Western art of the Middle Ages, classical underworld figures began to be depicted with a pitchfork. Early Christian writers identified the classical underworld with Hell, and its denizens as demons or devils. In the Renaissance, the bident became a conventional attribute of Pluto in art. Pluto, with Cerberus at his side, is shown holding the bident in the mythological ceiling mural painted by Raphael's workshop for the Villa Farnesina (the Loggia di Psiche, 1517–18). In a scene depicting a council of the gods, the three brothers Jove, Pluto, and Neptune are grouped closely, with a Cupid standing before them. Neptune holds the trident. Elsewhere in the loggia, a putto holds a bident.

Perhaps influenced by this work, Agostino Carracci had depicted Pluto with a bident in a preparatory drawing for his painting Pluto (1592), in which the god holds instead his characteristic key.

In Caravaggio's Giove, Nettuno e Plutone (ca. 1597), a ceiling mural based on alchemical allegory, Pluto – with his 3-headed dog, Cerberus – holds a bident. (Immediately beside him, Neptune is shown with a trident. Some writers have confused the two figures; Neptune's identity is confirmed by his embrace of the Hippocamp – the "sea horse" with fins for forelegs, and whose markings appear to repeat the trident in a stylized, perhaps symbolic, form.)

== See also ==
- Aegis
- Caduceus
- Cap of invisibility
- List of mythological objects
- Sasumata
- Thunderbolt
- Trident
