= Taria gens =

The gens Taria was a minor plebeian family at ancient Rome. Members of this gens are first mentioned in the time of Augustus, when Lucius Tarius Rufus attained the consulship.

== Praenomina ==
The praenomina used by the Tarii were the most common names at all periods of Roman history: Lucius, Gaius, Marcus, Publius, and Quintus, along with the slightly less-common Sextus.

== Branches and cognomina ==
A family of Tarii settled at Nedinum in Dalmatia by the first century, and Tarii were still living in Dalmatia a century later.

== Members ==
This list includes abbreviated praenomina. For an explanation of this practice, see filiation.

- Lucius Tarius Rufus, served under Octavian at the Battle of Actium, and was governor of Macedonia from 18 to 16 BC, when he was appointed consul suffectus. He was still living in AD 23, when he was named curator of Rome's aqueducts.
- Lucius Tarius Philargyrus, dedicated a tomb at Rome for his wife, Ebrilia Auctulla, dating from the late first century BC, or the early first century AD.
- Taria L. l. Apate, a freedwoman named in an inscription from Rome, dating from the first half of the first century.
- Marcus Tarius C. f., built a first-century tomb at Nedinum in Dalmatia for his siblings, Sextus Tarius, Taria Tertia, and Quintus Tarius.
- Sextus Tarius C. f., buried at Nedinum in a first-century tomb built by his brother, Marcus Tarius, for his siblings.
- Taria C. f. Tertia, buried at Nedinum in a first-century tomb built by her brother, Marcus Tarius, for his siblings.
- Quintus Tarius C. f., buried at Nedinum in a first-century tomb built by his brother, Marcus Tarius, for his siblings.
- Lucius Tarius L. l. Auctus, a freedman buried in a first-century tomb at Rome.
- Lucius Tarius Bello, built a first-century tomb at Rome for the freedwoman, Taria Sympherusa.
- Taria Sympherusa, a young freedwoman buried at Rome, aged fifteen, in a first-century tomb built by Lucius Tarius Bello.
- Marcus Tarius C. f. Triera, built a first-century tomb at Nedinum for himself and his siblings, Sextus Tarius, Taria Tertia, and Quintus Tarius.
- Sextus Tarius C. f., buried in a first-century tomb at Nedinum, built by his brother, Marcus Tarius Triera, for himself and his siblings.
- Taria C. f. Tertia, buried in a first-century tomb at Nedinum, built by her brother, Marcus Tarius Triera, for himself and his siblings.
- Quintus Tarius C. f., buried in a first-century tomb at Nedinum, built by his brother, Marcus Tarius Triera, for himself and his siblings.
- Gaius Tarius C. f. Sextio, the husband of Sentia Prima, who built a tomb at Nedinum, dating from the first century, or the first half of the second, for herself, her husband, her mother, Laecania Maxuma, and their children, Marcus Tarius Clemens, Publius Tarius Rufus, and Lucius Tarius Celsus.
- Marcus Tarius C. f. C. n. Clemens, the son of Gaius Tarius Sextio and Sentia Prima, buried in a first- or early second-century tomb at Nedinum, along with his parents, grandmother, and siblings.
- Publius Tarius C. f. C. n. Rufus, the son of Gaius Tarius Sextio and Sentia Prima, buried in a first- or early second-century tomb at Nedinum, along with his parents, grandmother, and siblings.
- Lucius Tarius C. f. C. n. Celsus, the son of Gaius Tarius Sextio and Sentia Prima, buried in a first- or early second-century tomb at Nedinum, along with his parents, grandmother, and siblings.
- Taria [...] l. Primigenia, a freedwoman, and the wife of the freedman Lucius Cenionius (Note: Perhaps this should be Ceionius, as there seem to be no other examples of Cenionius.) Priamus, who built a tomb for her at Alvona in Dalmatia, dating between the death of Augustus and the middle of the second century.
- Tarius Titianus, governor of Asia during the reign of Caracalla, about the beginning of the third century.
- Tarius, named in a sepulchral inscription from Epidaurum in Dalmatia, dating between the middle of the second century, and the end of the third.

=== Undated Tarii ===
- Tarius, a potter whose maker's mark was found at Mediomatrici in Gallia Belgica.
- Taria Fausta, buried at Rome, aged forty, alongside her husband, the freedman Lucius Tarius Protus.
- Taria Galla, buried at Rome, along with her husband, Lucius Tarius Speratus.
- Lucius Tarius Hymnus, buried in a family sepulchre at Rome.
- Tarius Lucanus, a veteran of the Legio XIII Gemina, buried at the present site of Daia Română, formerly part of Dacia.
- Lucius Tarius Philero, made an offering to Juno at Parma in Cisalpine Gaul.
- Lucius Tarius L. l. Protus, a freedman buried at Rome, along with his wife, Taria Fausta.
- Lucius Tarius Rufius, a potter whose maker's mark was found at the site of Siscia in Pannonia Superior.
- Lucius Tarius Speratus, buried at Rome, along with his wife, Taria Galla.

== See also ==
- List of Roman gentes

== Bibliography ==
- Sextus Julius Frontinus, De Aquaeductu (On Aqueducts).
- Theodor Mommsen et alii, Corpus Inscriptionum Latinarum (The Body of Latin Inscriptions, abbreviated CIL), Berlin-Brandenburgische Akademie der Wissenschaften (1853–present).
- René Cagnat et alii, L'Année épigraphique (The Year in Epigraphy, abbreviated AE), Presses Universitaires de France (1888–present).
- Paul von Rohden, Elimar Klebs, & Hermann Dessau, Prosopographia Imperii Romani (The Prosopography of the Roman Empire, abbreviated PIR), Berlin (1898).
- La Carte Archéologique de la Gaule (Archaeological Map of Gaul, abbreviated CAG), Académie des Inscriptions et Belles-Lettres (1931–present).
- Inscriptiones Daciae Romanae (Inscriptions from Roman Dacia, abbreviated IDR), Bucharest (1975–present).
