= Bierzo Edict =

Roman document

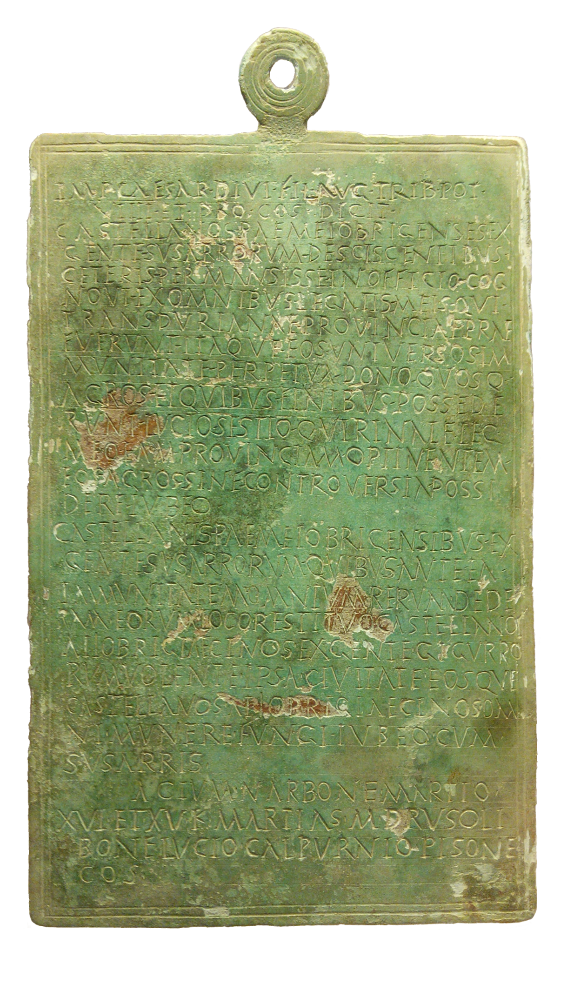

The Bierzo Edict, also referred to as the Edict of Augustus from El Bierzo and the Bembibre Bronze is a controversial document dated to 15 BC found in El Bierzo in Spain in 1999. The document is a bronze tablet measuring 24.15 cm x 15.6 cm. At the top it has a moulded 3 cm ring.

The inscription contains the combined publication of two edicts by Augustus, one issued on 14 February and the other on 15 February.

== Text ==
Imp(erator) · Caesar · Divi · fil(ius) · Aug(ustus) · trib(unicia) · pot(estate) ·
VIIII · et · pro·co(n)s(ule) · dicit · Castellanos · Paemeiobrigenses · ex ·
gente · Susarrorum · desciscentibus ·
ceteris · permansisse · in officio · cog
novi · ex omnibus · legatis · meis · qui ·
Transdurianae · provinciae · prae/fuerunt · itaque · eos · universos · im
munitate · perpetua · dono · quosq(ue)
agros · et quibus · finibus · possede
runt · Lucio · Sestio · Quirinale leg(ato) ·
meo · eam · provinciam · optinente{m} ·
eos · agros · sine · controversia · possi
dere · iubeo
Castellanis · Paemeiobrigensibus · ex
gente · Susarrorum · quibus · ante · ea ·
immunitatem · omnium · rerum · dede
ram · eorum · loco · restituo castellanos
Allobrigiaecinos · ex gente · Gigurro
rum · volente · ipsa · civitate · eosque
castellanos · Allobrigiaecinos · om
ni · munere · fungi · iubeo · cum ·
Susarris ·
Actum · Narbone · Martio ·
XVI · et · XV · k(alendas) · Martias · M(arco) · Druso · Li
bone · Lucio · Calpurnio · Pisone
co(n)s(ulibus)»

=== Translation ===
"The emperor Caesar Augustus, son of The Divine, in his ninth tribunitial power and proconsul, says: I knew from my legates which presided over the Transdurian province [note, this province disappears during Augustus also] that the inhabitants of the Paemeiobrigensian hillfort [= castellum, it could just mean a community in general], belonging to the people of the Susarri, had remained faithful, while the rest became dissidents. Therefore, I bestow them a permanent immunity and the possession of their land [it therefore did not become ager publicus], with the same boundaries which they had when my legate Lucius Sextus Quirinalis governed this province [historical note, this area was supposedly pacified after the Cantabrian Wars, BC29-19, and this edict is from BC15]. To the inhabitants of the Paemeiobrigan hillfort [again, castellum], of the people of the Susarri, and onto which I bestowed full immunity, I restore to their place the people of the Aliobrigiaecinan hillfort [castellum], of the people of the Gigurri, into the same civitas, and order that these from the Alobrigiaecino hillfort fulfill all the obligations together [within] the Susarrans. Said in Narbo Martius (Narbonne) the 16th and 15th days before the kalends of March, being consuls M. Drusus Libo and L. Calpurnius Piso."

== Authenticity ==
An international symposium was organised by the city museum of León, Spain in 2001 which discussed the inscription and various anomalies including the lead content of the bronze, various textual issues, the two dates and the title given to Augustus.

== Bibliography ==
- Alföldy, Géza (2000). "Das neue Edikt des Augustus aus El Bierzo in Hispanien" [The new edict of Augustus from El Bierzo in Hispania] (PDF). Zeitschrift für Papyrologie und Epigraphik. 131: 177–205. JSTOR 20190676.
