= Gnaeus Cornelius Lentulus Augur =

Roman politician and general during the reign of Augustus (c.54 BC-25 AD)

Gnaeus Cornelius Lentulus "Augur" (c. 54 BC – 25 AD) was a politician and general of the early Roman Empire during the reign of Augustus, who became consul in 14 BC as the colleague of Marcus Licinius Crassus Frugi. Enormously wealthy, he reputedly was forced by emperor Tiberius to commit suicide in 25 AD.

== Life and career ==
A member of the patrician gens Cornelia, the Lentuli were among the most haughty of the old Patrician families, with a long distinguished lineage that stretched back to the Sack of Rome in 387 BC. Lentulus Augur was an impoverished member of the family, and was only able to qualify for the Roman Senate as a result of a generous donation from the emperor Augustus. This in effect meant that he became a client of the emperor. He was used by Augustus to demonstrate the support of the ancient great houses for the system of the Principate, as well as his dedication to reviving the name and status of the old Roman nobility. He might be identical with Gnaeus Cornelius Lentulus, who was a quaestor in 29 BC; if so, his children were Publius Cornelius Lentulus Scipio, Servius Cornelius Lentulus Maluginensis and Cosconia Gallita. With the emperor's support, he was awarded the consulship in 14 BC.

Lentulus was appointed as the Proconsular governor of Asia, where he served from 2 to 1 BC. Lentulus was also given the opportunity to pursue a military career, and he was appointed imperial legate of Illyricum sometime before 4 AD. It is believed that he was also the imperial legate in Moesia before 6 AD, where he fought across the Danube, winning an honorary triumph for his victories over the Getae.

In 14 AD he was serving along the Danube under Drusus as his Comes. The new emperor, Tiberius, had appointed him in the hope he would act as an advisor to Drusus. His presence was resented by the Pannonian legions, who mutinied after the death of Augustus. They attacked him and he was only rescued through the intervention of Drusus.

He returned to Rome in 16 AD. When Marcus Scribonius Libo Drusus killed himself (after being accused of treason), he recommended in the Senate that members of the gens Scribonius were never again to bear the name Drusus. Then in 22 AD, while standing in for the absent pontifex maximus, he objected to the appointment of the incumbent flamen dialis, Servius Cornelius Lentulus Maluginensis (his possible son) as governor of Asia. That same year he proposed that the property inherited by Gaius Junius Silanus through his mother would not be confiscated as a result of Silanus’ conviction of extortion, to which Tiberius agreed.

In 24 AD, he was accused of conspiring to murder Tiberius along with Numerius Vibius Serenus, Marcus Caecilius Cornutus and Lucius Seius Tubero. The emperor exonerated him of all charges. Tiberius declared that, “I am not worthy to live if Lentulus hates me as well.”

Lentulus died in 25 AD, leaving his enormous fortune to Tiberius. Tacitus implied that this was a voluntary act; Suetonius, however, states that he committed suicide and was forced to leave his fortune to Tiberius.

A wealthy man (estimated at 400 million Sesterces according to Seneca), his freedmen had reduced him to poverty before he was able to reclaim his wealth through the generosity of Augustus. He was given large coastal estates in Tarraconensis by Augustus, who was an absentee landholder. After his death, his lands went mostly to Tiberius, but some of his Spanish estates were obtained by the Vibii Serenii.

Seneca described Lentulus as:

A barren mind, and a spirit no less feeble. He was the greatest of misers, but freer with coins than talk, so dire was his poverty of speech. He owed all his advancement to Augustus.

Tacitus had a much higher opinion of him, describing him as:

A man who bore his poverty with fortitude, and when he innocently acquired great wealth, he used it with great moderation.

== Bibliography ==
=== Ancient ===
- Tacitus, Annals
- Suetonius, Life of Tiberius

=== Modern ===
- Bunson, Matthew (1995). A Dictionary of the Roman Empire. Oxford and New York: Oxford University Press. ISBN 978-0-19510-233-8.
- Cooley, Alison E. (2012). The Cambridge Manual of Latin Epigraphy. Cambridge and New York: Cambridge University Press. ISBN 978-0-52154-954-7.
- Keay, S. J. Roman Spain University of California Press (1988)
- Seneca, Moral and Political Essays, Trans. John Madison Cooper, Cambridge University Press (1995)
- Smith, William, Dictionary of Greek and Roman Biography and Mythology, Vol II (1867).
- Syme, Ronald (1939). The Roman Revolution. Oxford, UK: Oxford University Press. ASIN B00085940Y.

Political offices
| Preceded by Marcus Livius Drusus Libo; Lucius Calpurnius Piso Caesoninus | Roman consul 14 BC with Marcus Licinius Crassus Frugi | Succeeded by Tiberius Claudius Nero; Publius Quinctilius Varus |
