= Li Bo (disambiguation) =

Li Bai or Li Bo (701–762) was a Tang dynasty Chinese poet.

Li Bo or Bo Li may also refer to:

- Bo Li (statistician), Chinese-American geostatistician and paleoclimatologist
- Lee Bo, one of the missing booksellers of Causeway Bay Books in Hong Kong
- Li Bo (ecologist) (1929–1998), Chinese phytoecologist

== Sports ==
- Li Bo (sport shooter), Chinese sports shooter
- Li Bo (footballer) for Guangxi Longguida F.C.
- Li Bo (skier), Cross-country skiing at the 2010 Winter Paralympics – Men's 10 km Classic
- Bo Li (athlete) from 2005 World Youth Championships in Athletics
- Li Bo (referee) from 2009 Guangzhou Pharmaceutical F.C. season
- Haku Ri, Japanese volleyball player

== See also ==
- Libo (disambiguation)
