= Publius Cornelius Scipio (consul 16 BC) =

Publius Cornelius Scipio (born 48 BC) was a Roman senator active during the Principate. He was consul in 16 BC as the colleague of Lucius Domitius Ahenobarbus. He was also proconsular governor of Asia, probably around the years 8/7 BC.

== Ancestry ==
Little is known about Scipio's ancestry, beyond his father's praenomen Publius. The latest securely documented members of the Cornelii Scipiones was Metellus Scipio and his daughter Cornelia; there were still several Scipiones during the Principate, but how they are related is a subject of conjecture. The use of Publius, primarily used by the Scipiones Nasicae, could indicate that he was the grandson of Metellus Scipio, but he could have also been a son (or grandson) of Scipio Salvito.

It was long believed the consul of 16 BC was the son of a hypothesized Publius Cornelius Scipio, the first husband of Scribonia, later the wife of Octavian. Suetonius only mentions children from Scribonia's second marriage.

== Family ==
At least two people have been identified as his children by an unidentified woman:

- Cornelius Scipio, who was accused of and punished for adultery with Julia the Elder in 2 BC. While Ronald Syme believes this man is different from the consul, Henri Etcheto believes he could be the same as the consul of 16 BC.
- Publius Cornelius Scipio, quaestor in Achaea circa AD 2. Another suggestion by Syme; however Etcheto argues this man could have been adopted from the plebeian Aurelii Orestides, because this Scipio was tribune of the plebs, a magistracy only held by the plebeians and the Scipiones were patricians.

Syme also suggests possible third child, the "Cornelia Scipionum gentis" wife of the long-lived Lucius Volusius Saturninus, consul in AD 3. However, in another part of his book Syme notes this Cornelia is mentioned in an inscription as "L.f." and suggests Scipio's possible daughter was the mother of Volusius' wife by Lucius Cornelius Lentulus consul of 3 BC. Etcheto rejects this connection with the Corneli Lentuli, and considers that she was a direct heir of the Scipiones, but does not attempt to identify her father.

== See also ==
- List of Roman consuls

== Bibliography ==
- Alison E. Cooley, The Cambridge Manual of Latin Epigraphy, Cambridge: University Press, 2012.
- Henri Etcheto, Les Scipions. Famille et pouvoir à Rome à l’époque républicaine, Bordeaux, Ausonius Éditions, 2012
- R.A. Billows, "The Last of the Scipios", American Journal of Ancient History, 7 (1982), pp. 53–68.
- Ronald Syme, The Augustan Aristocracy, Oxford: Clarendon Press, 1986.

Political offices
Preceded by Gaius Furnius, and Gaius Junius Silanus as Ordinary consul	Consul of the Roman Empire; 16 BC with Lucius Domitius Ahenobarbus	Succeeded by Lucius Tarius Rufus as Suffect consul
