= Guilford Puteal =

Ancient Roman marble sculpture

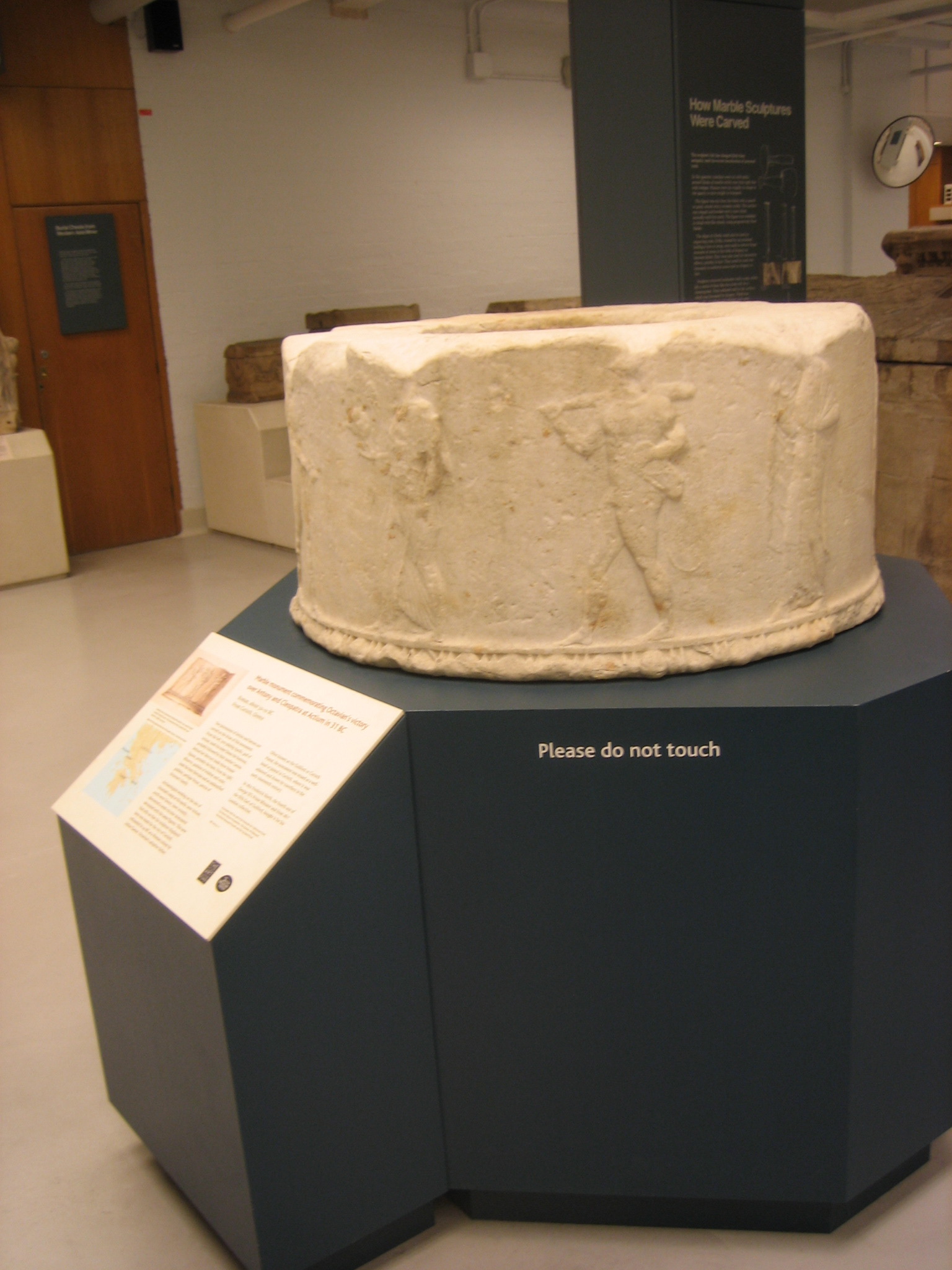
The Guilford Puteal in its current display.

The Guilford Puteal is a Pentelic marble Ancient Roman sculpture. Its name derives from its use as a puteal or wellhead, and one of its previous owners, Frederick North, second Earl of Guilford. Its discovery in Corinth gives rise to an alternative modern name, the Corinth Puteal.

== Origin ==
The puteal—wellhead is a cylindrical drum 50 cm by 106 cm and dates to circa 30-10 BC. It is part of a commemorative memorial in the city of ancient Corinth, which at that time had recently been refounded by Augustus's adoptive father Julius Caesar, that celebrated Augustus's victory at the battle of Actium. Work is ongoing to locate the likely original site of the monument from which it came, perhaps even with part of its missing moulding restored.

=== Iconography ===
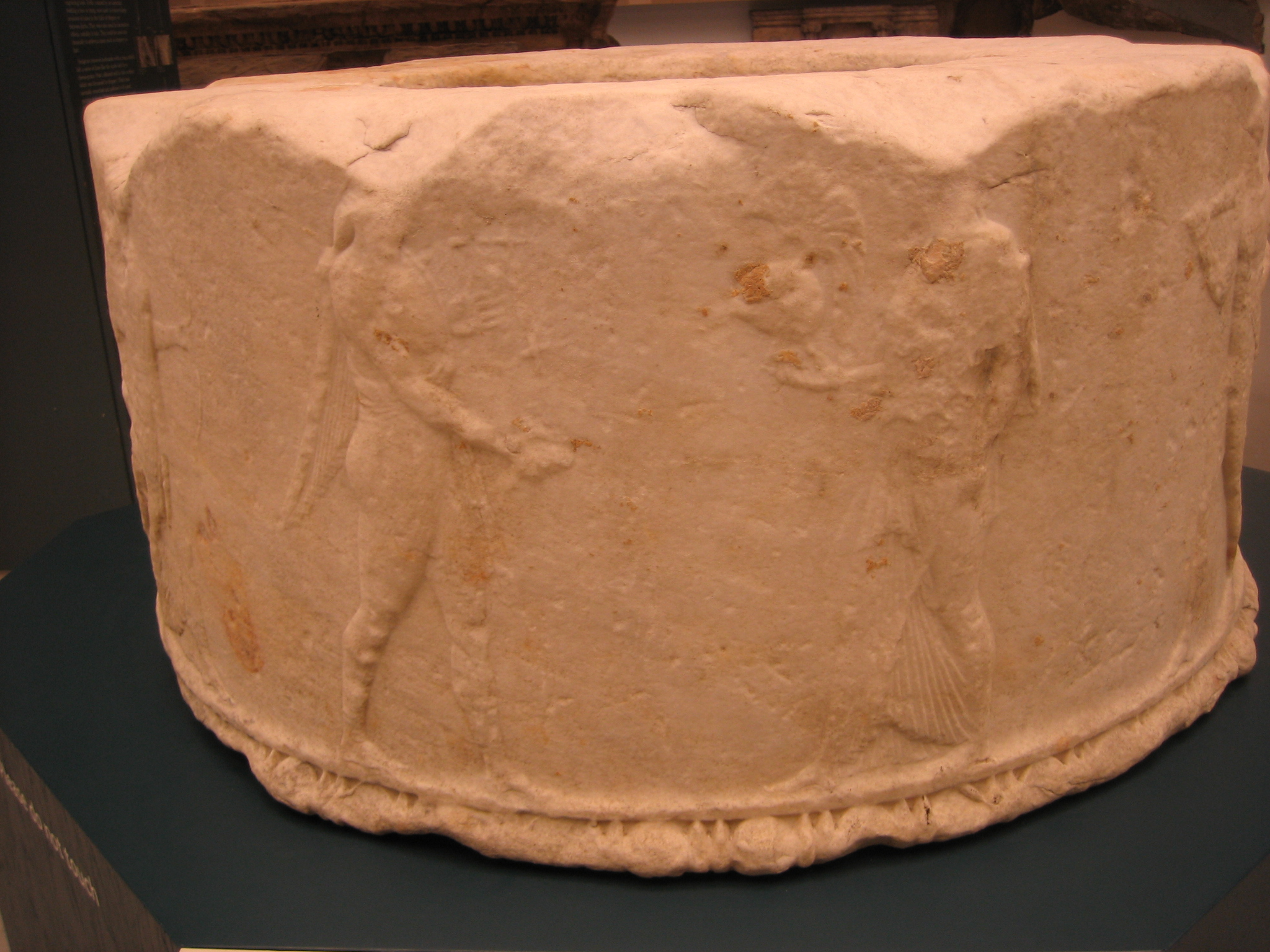
Apollo (left) meeting Athena (right)

The wellhead is decorated in bas-relief, with ten figures of deities and heroes. At the front two small processions meet: on the left is Apollo with his lyre (Augustus's patron deity) who leads Artemis (trailing her stag) and another female figure, probably their mother Leto. Behind Leto, from left to right, is Hermes/Mercury (in winged sandals) leading three dancing women or nymphs. On the right is Athena/Minerva (another patron of Augustus, her arm extended to hold her helmet) leading Herakles/Hercules (with his club on his shoulder and a quiver beneath his arm, patron of Augustus's defeated enemy Mark Antony) and a veiled woman (Hera, Aphrodite or Heracles's bride Hebe). The figures were spaced wide apart, and were designed in the Neo Attic style, a Roman version of the archaic sixth century BC Greek style.

=== Similar examples ===
Similar examples include:

1. A relief in the collection of the Villa Albani in Rome, catalogued in the 18th century by Winckelmann
2. A semi-circular puteal from Nicopolis, now on show at the Archaeological Museum at Ioannina;
3. Another, smashed into tiny fragments, has similar archaising figures of deities.
4. A fragmentary base from Ephesus in western Turkey, itself recycled for later use and now in the collections of the Kunsthistorisches Museum, Vienna. The Ephesus puteal is decorated with some similar figures, but also others that do not appear on the Corinth Guilford Puteal; it also has a Greek inscription honouring the children of the recently deceased Agrippa, who had charge of Octavian's fleet at Actium.

== History to the 19th century ==
It was used as a well-head after antiquity, either by a 19th-century Turkish owner or possibly earlier. This Turk displayed it the right way up, endangering the remains of the figures through friction of the well-rope against the marble. Its next owner was Notara, a cultured Greek official with a fine library who was a member of a distinguished family who could trace their descent back to the Byzantine Palaeologi; Notara also used it in his garden as a wellhead but inverted it in an attempt to save it from further damage. By the time it passed to him its upper moulding, much of the bead-and-reel decoration of its lower moulding, and (most likely from an act of vandalism of unknown date, perhaps related to iconoclasm) the heads of the figures moving in two processions around the drum had all already been lost.

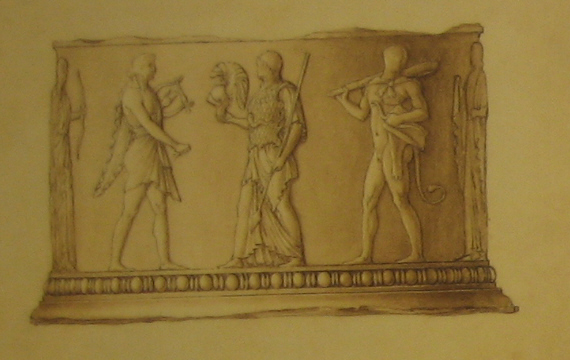
One of Dodwell's images of the Guilford Puteal

In the earliest years of the nineteenth century Notara presided over a guest-house for western travellers to Corinth, by which circumstances the Guilford Puteal became known to western Europeans. While there it was seen by Edward Dodwell in 1805 and drawn by his artist Simone Pomardi, and was described by Dodwell in his account of his travels in Greece. It was seen by Colonel William Leake in 1806. Dodwell perceptively recognised its close links with a relief in the collection of the Villa Albani in Rome, catalogued in the eighteenth century by Winckelmann. Otto Magnus von Stackelberg also drew casts of it, which had been taken to Athens.

It was then acquired by Frederick North (later Earl of Guilford) in 1810 at Corinth. It was among the sixty crates of marble sculpture he shipped from Greece in 1813. These were for display at his London house in Westminster, which he never inhabited but which contained his library and collections; it was acquired with its contents on his death in 1827 by Thomas Wentworth Beaumont, an MP and member of a Yorkshire family. It was he who moved it to Bretton Hall for display, possibly in the stables built in 1830 by George Basevi, better known as the architect of the Fitzwilliam Museum, Cambridge.

=== Loss and rediscovery ===
When the German scholar Adolf Michaelis came to compile his great work, Ancient Marbles in Great Britain in the 1860s, the Guilford Puteal's location had already been lost to academia, and so he issued a rallying-cry in an article in the Journal of Hellenic Studies (vol. 5, 1884). A century later, its whereabouts still remained unknown and the object only known through drawings and reproductions of casts.

Meanwhile, it passed with Bretton Hall to West Riding County Council (in 1947, becoming a teacher training college) and then (in 2000) to Leeds University. In 1992 Peter Brears, curator of Leeds City Museum, and Bretton Hall fine art professor David Hill, sent a letter to the British Museum's Department of Greek and Roman Antiquities, rightly surmising that a couple of sculptures in the Hall's gardens were ancient and of interest. One was the Puteal, then in use as a planter. By 1995, a keeper of the British Museum was then able to match figures from Pomardi and von Stackelberg's drawings to Brears's slides of the sculptures. This positive identification led to the sculpture's being moved and conserved using the British Museum's and Henry Moore Foundation expertise, but it was not exhibited at this time, despite plans to do so.

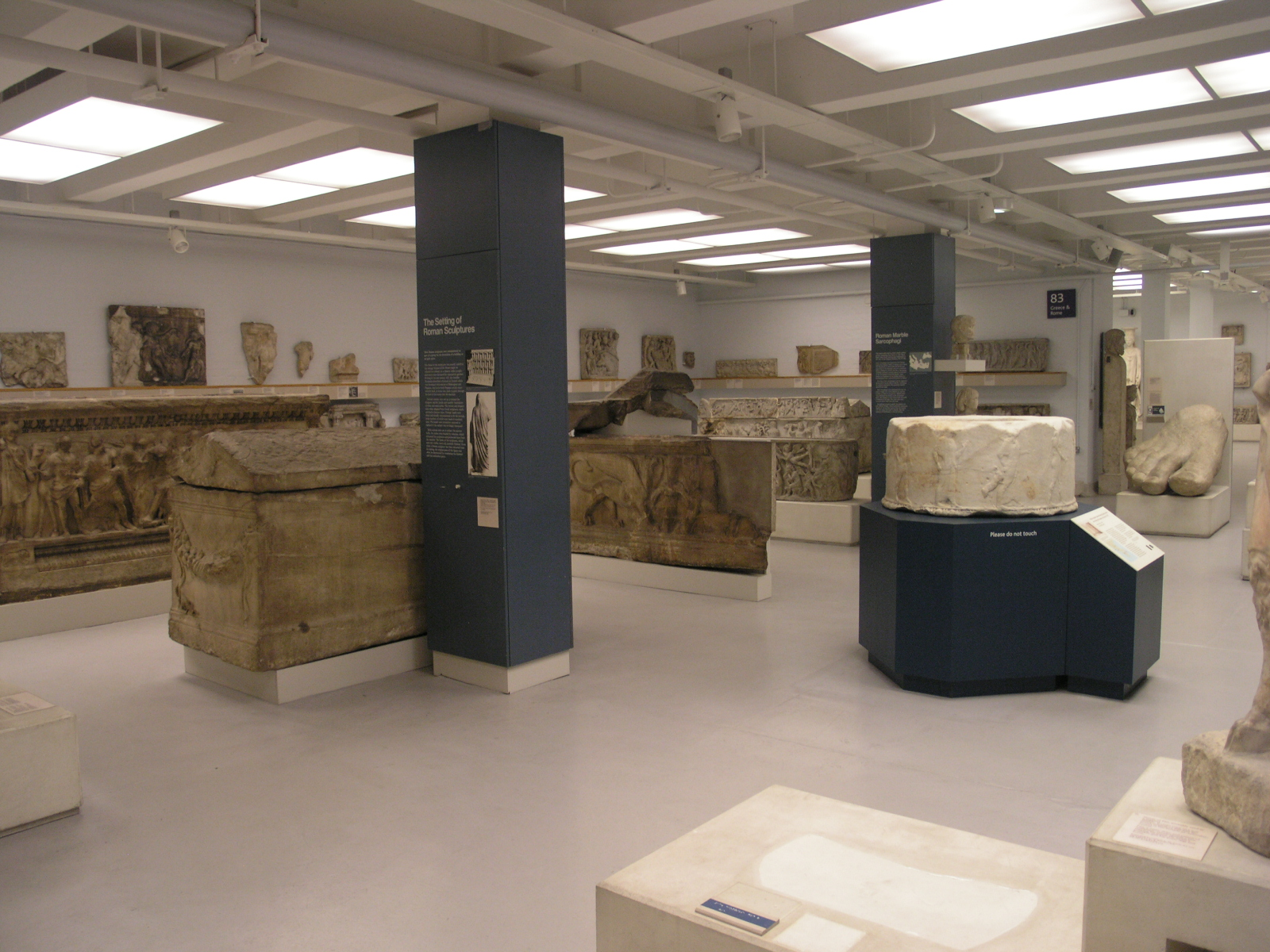
The Puteal (right) in its current location

On the College's absorption into Leeds University, the Higher Education Funding Council for England instructed the University to put the Puteal and an altar from the same collection on the art market.

By 2002 Christie's had valued them and an overseas sale had been negotiated. However, at the same time the Nicopolis examples were found and came to the attention of the same BM keeper. This discovery, giving it a date and context for the first time, allowed the Department for Culture, Media and Sport to stop export of the Guilford Puteal while the British Museum raised the necessary funds to acquire it. It was eventually bought for £294,009 (including an £108,000 Art Fund grant and other money from the Heritage Lottery Fund, the British Museum Friends and the Caryatids of the Greek and Roman Department) - this would have been higher had it gone onto the open market and through the usual sales processes, or if the Museum had not been able to respond as rapidly as it could due to the Nicopolis discovery.

As part of the University-College merger agreement with HEFCE, 80% of the proceeds went to the HEFCE and 20% to the University to offset the significant investment both the University and College had made to the pieces' upkeep.

At the British Museum the Guilford Puteal was at first displayed as a triumphant new acquisition in the Round Reading Room in the Queen Elizabeth II Great Court, but is now on display in the limited-opening Room 83 in the basement.
