= Lucius Tarius Rufus =

Roman senator and military officer

Lucius Tarius Rufus (fl. 31 BC – AD 24) was a Roman senator and military officer who was elected suffect consul in 16 BC to replace Publius Cornelius Scipio.

== Biography ==
A novus homo of obscure birth, and possibly hailing from Dalmatia, Tarius Rufus was a sailor by profession. He first came to notice as one of the admirals who fought under Octavian at the Battle of Actium in 31 BC. He engaged a squadron of ships led by Gaius Sosius prior to the actual battle, but was driven back by Sosius until Marcus Vipsanius Agrippa arrived with reinforcements.

Tarius Rufus was later appointed Propraetorial governor of Macedonia from around 18 BC to 16 BC. During this time he fought off a raid by the Sarmatians, and he may have also conquered the Scordisci during his time as governor. As a reward for his military service, Augustus appointed Tarius Rufus suffect consul when Augustus was forced to leave Rome to travel to Gaul. During his term as consul, he altered the imagery and text of the Roman coins to greatly amplify the prestige and paramount importance of the princeps in the form of Augustus.

As an elderly senator, Tarius Rufus was appointed curator aquarum (or officer in charge of the aqueducts) from AD 23 to 24.

An amicus of both Augustus and Tiberius, Augustus bestowed on him a great deal of wealth, which he used to purchase large parcels of land in Picenum. Although noted for his stinginess, he spent 100 million sesterces to buy up the land in an attempt to enhance his social standing, only to have his heir refuse to accept the estate after Tarius Rufus’s death. Tarius Rufus also brought charges of attempted parricide against one of his sons who was after his father's money. He held a consilium, and invited Augustus to attend. He found his son guilty and exiled him to Massilia; Augustus declared that he would not accept any inheritance or bequest from Tarius Rufus.

== See also ==
- List of Roman consuls

== Sources ==
- Broughton, T. Robert S., The Magistrates of the Roman Republic, Vol II (1951)
- Syme, Ronald; Birley, Anthony, Provincial At Rome: and Rome and the Balkans 80BC-AD14 (1999)

Political offices
Preceded by Publius Cornelius Scipio, and Lucius Domitius Ahenobarbus as Ordinary consuls	Suffect consul of the Roman Empire; 16 BC	Succeeded by Marcus Livius Drusus Libo, and Lucius Calpurnius Piso Caesoninus as Ordinary consuls
