= Sulpicius Lupercus Servastus =

Sulpicius Lupercus Servastus (or Servasius; fl. c. 4th century AD or later) was a Latin poet. Two poems are extant; an elegy, De Cupiditate, in forty-two lines, and a sapphic ode, De Vetustate, in twelve lines.

== See also ==
- Sulpicia gens
