= Puteal =

Classical wellhead

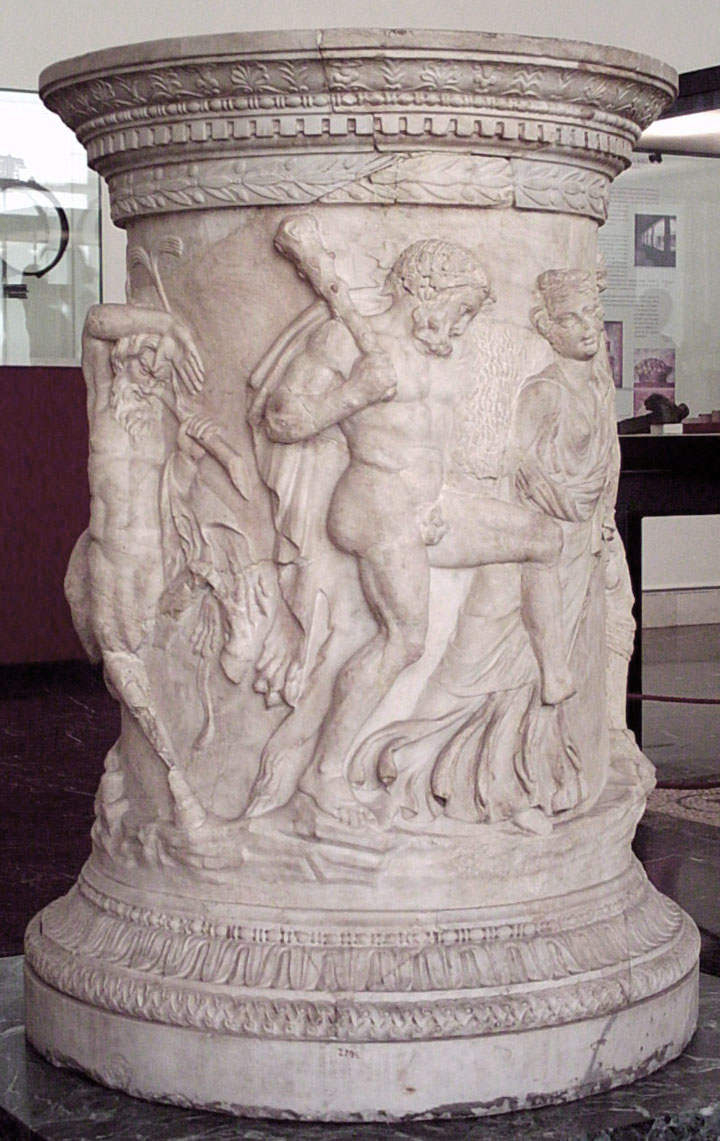
Roman marble puteal with Bacchic procession, late 1st-century CE

A puteal (Latin: from puteus ("well") – pl.: putealia) is a classical wellhead built around a water well's access opening.

== Description ==
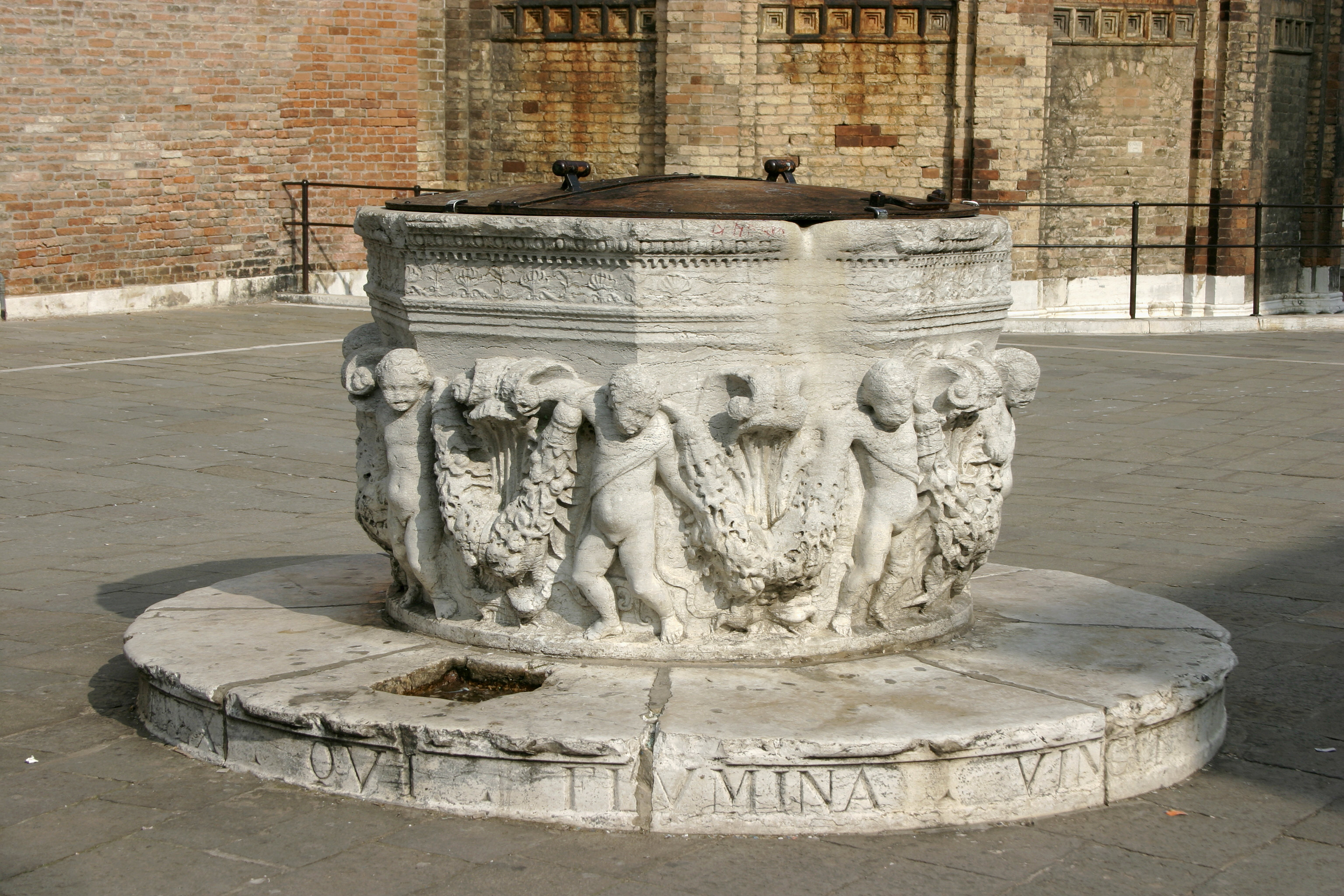
Puteal with bas-relief in the Campo Santi Giovanni e Paolo, Venice

The enclosure keeps people from falling down a well otherwise open at grade level. When equipped with a cast iron lid, as traditionally in the public squares, or campos, of Venice, Italy, the citizens and water supply were protected.

Putealia were used as an accessible point of water distribution, and as an aesthetic architectural element. Locations included public town squares and private courtyards. They were often found in atriums, where they gave access to the water cistern fed by the impluvium.

=== Classical putealia ===
The classical puteal is made of carved stone, often marble in Europe. They are frequently decorated with bas-reliefs of classical Greek and Roman themes around their outer faces. An Ancient Roman one was in the Puteal Scribonianum structure in the Roman Forum, nothing remains.

The term is also used for circular classical remains (spolia) recycled after antiquity into wellheads, such as the Guildford Puteal at the British Museum.

== See also ==
- Bidental
- Fontus (Fons) — the ancient Roman god of fountains and wellheads
- Wishing well
