= Lucius Calpurnius Piso Caesoninus (consul 15 BC) =

Roman senator and confidant of the emperors Augustus and Tiberius

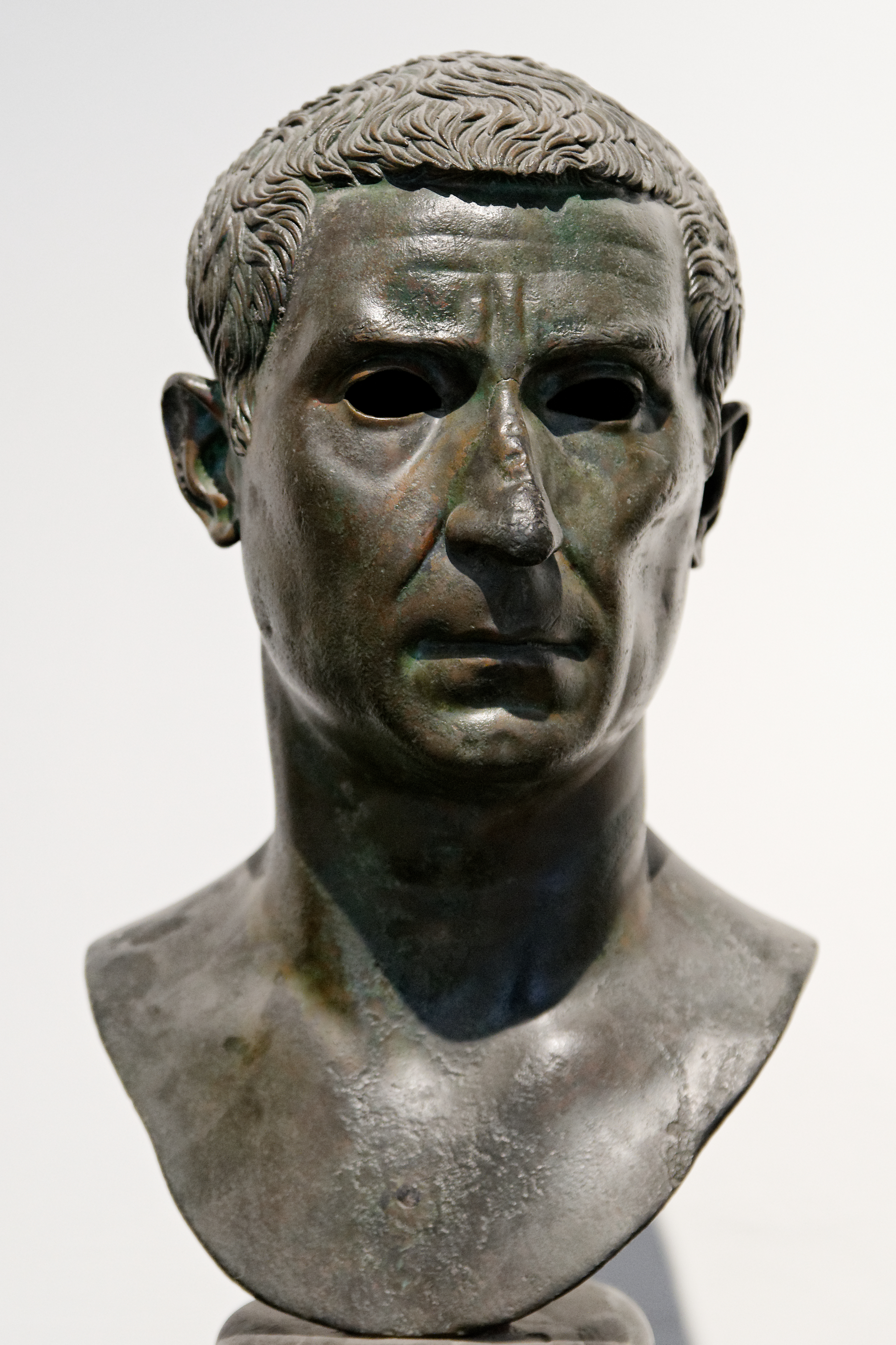
- Portrait of L. Calpurnius Piso Pontifex from the Villa of the Papyri at Herculaneum
- Born: 48 BC
- Died: AD 32 (age 78-79)
- Other name: Lucius Calpurnius Piso Pontifex
- Office: Consul (15 BC)

Notes
- PW 99

Lucius Calpurnius Piso Caesoninus (48 BC – AD 32) was a prominent Roman senator of the early Empire. His tenure as pontifex led him sometimes to be called Lucius Calpurnius Piso Pontifex, to differentiate him from his contemporary, Lucius Calpurnius Piso the Augur, consul in 1 BC. He was a confidant of the emperors Augustus and Tiberius.

== Biography ==
He was the son of Lucius Calpurnius Piso Caesoninus, consul in 58 BC, and half-brother of Calpurnia, the third and last wife of Julius Caesar.

Piso was consul in 15 BC, and shortly thereafter engaged in Mediolanum as proconsul. Cassius Dio refers to him as governor of Pamphylia in the years 13 to 11 BC; his province probably included Galatia. In 11 BC, he was sent to Thrace as legatus pro praetore in order to put down a revolt. For his successes there, the Roman Senate honoured him with the ornamenta triumphalia.

Piso was proconsul of Asia around 1 AD, serving from Ephesus. Prior to that, Piso is generally thought by historians to have been the unidentified legate of Syria from 4 BC to 1 AD. This posting was near Ephesus, fits with Piso's career and military honors, and lines up well with the Lapis Tiburtinus inscription, however this identification is still not certain. He was praefectus urbi from AD 13 to 32, and a trusted adviser to both Augustus and Tiberius. He was a member of the pontifical college and of the Arval Brethren. He died in 32, and was honoured with a state funeral.

Piso's achievements and independence were highly regarded. Horace dedicated his Ars Poëtica to him (cf. Carmen 2.12), and several epigrams by Antipater of Thessalonica are dedicated to Piso.

== Name ==
Piso's full nomenclature is somewhat uncertain. Tacitus simply refers to him as Lucius Piso, while the Fasti Albenses call him Lucius Calpurnius Piso. He is sometimes called Lucius Calpurnius Piso Pontifex, to distinguish him from his contemporary, Lucius Calpurnius Piso Augur, although both Pontifex and Augur are simply nicknames, rather than true cognomina. Drumann assigned Piso the agnomen Caesoninus, which had been borne by his ancestors for four generations; but in later editions he is assigned the name Frugi instead. There are two grounds for the latter identification. First, Cassius Dio assigns him the surname Fourtios, which is supposed to be a corruption of Frugi. Secondly, Theodor Mommsen identified his sons, to whom the Ars Poëtica is addressed, with Lucius Calpurnius Piso and Marcus Licinius Crassus Frugi, consuls in AD 27.

However, Klebs doubted this interpretation of Fourtios, and it is not at all certain that the consuls of AD 27 were the sons of Lucius Calpurnius Piso Pontifex. They might instead have been the sons of Gnaeus Calpurnius Piso, consul in 7 BC. As a result, the question of whether Piso the pontifex was surnamed Caesoninus or Frugi is unresolved.

== See also ==
- Bierzo Edict
- Calpurnia gens
- Villa of the Papyri
- List of Roman consuls

== Sources ==
- Seneca, Epistulae 83.14

Political offices
Preceded by L. Domitius Ahenobarbus; P. Cornelius Scipio	Roman consul 15 BC with Marcus Livius Drusus Libo	Succeeded by M. Licinius Crassus Frugi; Cn. Cornelius Lentulus
