= Sulpicius Apollinaris =

Carthaginian grammarian

Sulpicius Apollinaris was a learned grammarian of Carthage who flourished in the 2nd century AD. He taught Pertinax, himself a teacher of grammar before he was emperor, and Aulus Gellius, who speaks of him in the highest terms. He is the reputed author of the metrical arguments to the Aeneid and to the plays of Terence and (probably) Plautus. (J. W. Beck, De Sulpicio Apollinari, 1884)

== See also ==
- Sulpicia (gens)
