= Bembibre =

- Coat of arms
- Motto: Interamnium Flavium (Between Rivers)
- Location within Spain
- Coordinates: 42°36′54.98″N 6°25′12.36″W
- Country: Spain
- Autonomous community: Castile and León
- Province: León
- Comarca: El Bierzo
- Municipality: Bembibre

Government
  - Mayor: José Manuel Otero Merayo (PP)

Area
  - Total: 63.42 km^{2} (24.49 sq mi)
- Elevation: 644 m (2,113 ft)

Population (2025-01-01)
  - Total: 8,041
  - Density: 126.8/km^{2} (328.4/sq mi)
- Demonym: bembibrense
- Time zone: UTC+1 (CET)
  - Summer (DST): UTC+2 (CEST)
- Postal Code: 24300
- Telephone prefix: 987
- Climate: Csb
- Website: http://www.aytobembibre.es

Bembibre (Spanish pronunciation: [bemˈbiβɾe]) is a municipality and a city located in the region of El Bierzo, province of León, Castile and León, Spain. According to the 2014 census (INE), the municipality had a population of 9,631 inhabitants. The second largest urban settlement in the region of El Bierzo, it is considered the capital of the "Bierzo Alto" traditional shire. Two rivers cross Bembibre: Boeza and Noceda.

== History ==
The numerous remains of Cisastur fortifications (castros) found along the city's surroundings prove that man has inhabited these lands from ancient times. However, the origin of the current settlements goes back to the repopulations made in the Middle Ages during the centuries ninth through eleventh, linked to the Church and the edification of several monasteries in the region.

== Language ==
As in the rest of the community of Castilla y León, Spanish is the most widely spoken language and the language of instruction in schools.

== See also ==
- Province of León
- El Bierzo
- Bierzo Edict

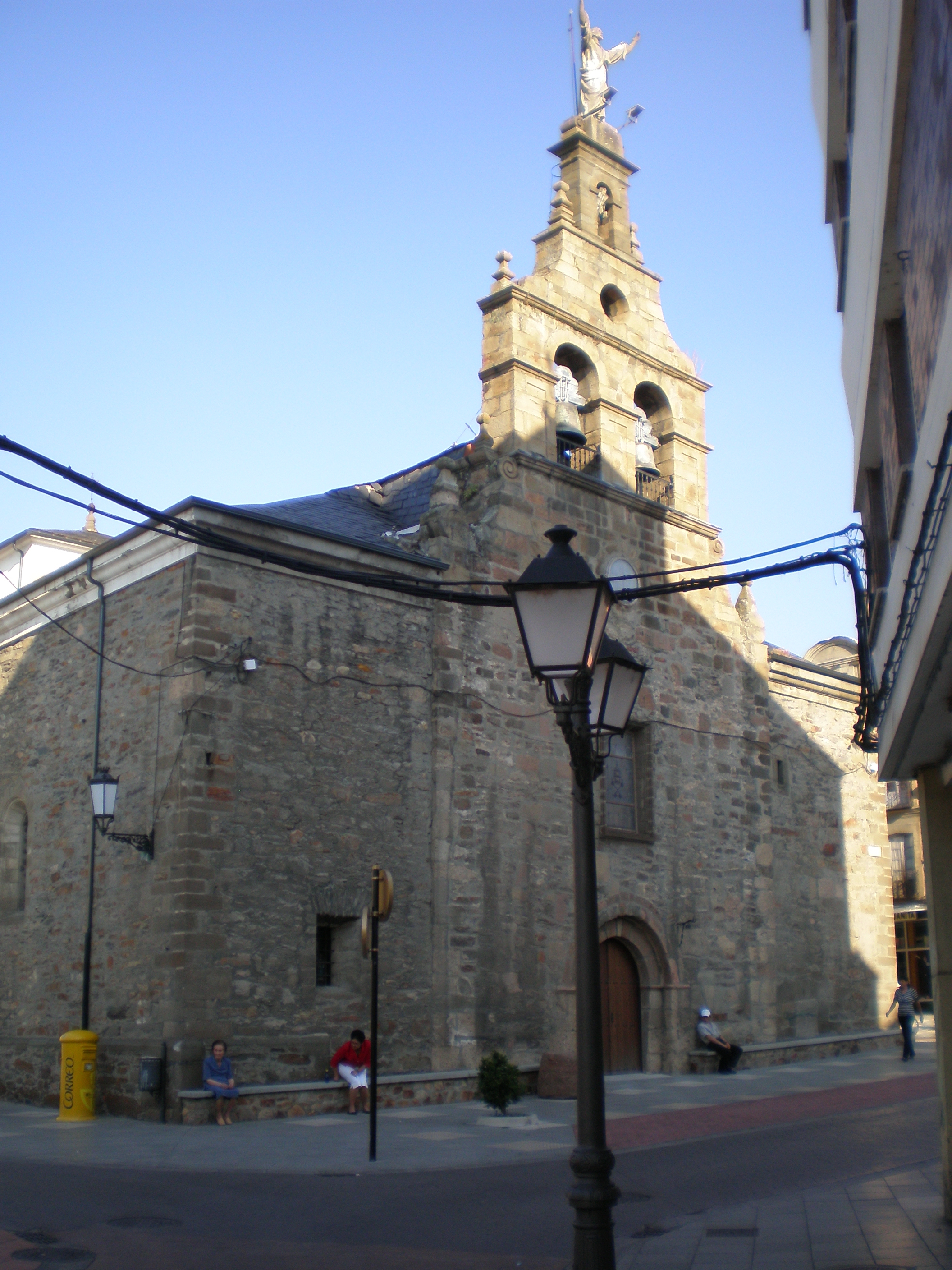
Church of San Pedro Apóstol in Bembibre.

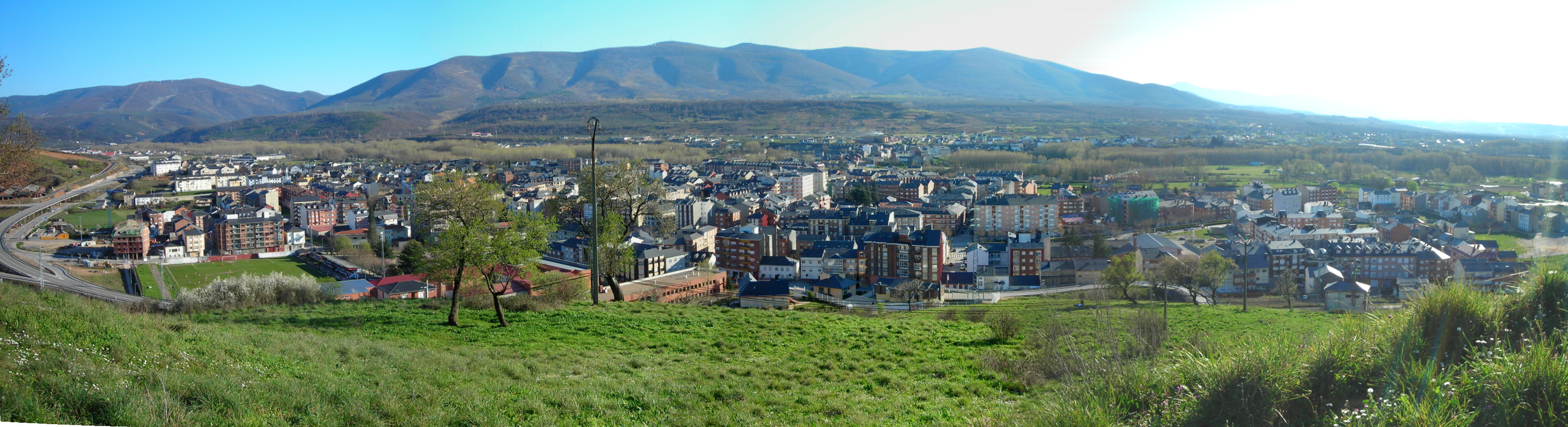
Bembibre
