= Puteal Scribonianum =

Structure in the Forum Romanum in Ancient Rome

Coordinates: 41.8917°N 12.4857°E

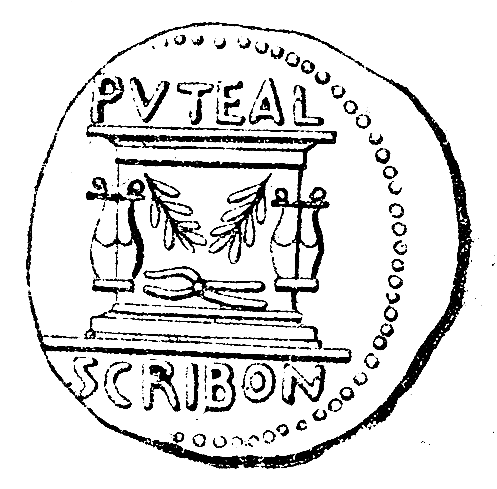
The Puteal Scribonianum on a 62 BC denarius

The Puteal Scribonianum (Scribonian Puteal) or Puteal Libonis (Puteal of Libo) was a structure in the Forum Romanum in Ancient Rome. A puteal was a classical wellhead, round or sometimes square, placed atop a well opening to keep people from falling in.

The Scribonian Puteal was dedicated or restored by a member of the Libo family, perhaps the praetor of 204 BC, or the tribune of the people in 149 BC. The praetor's tribunal was convened nearby, having been removed from the comitium in the 2nd century BC. It thus became a place where litigants, money-lenders and business people congregated.

According to ancient sources, the Scribonian Puteal was a bidental—a spot that had been struck by lightning. It took its name from its resemblance to the stone curb or low enclosure around a well (puteus) that was between the Temple of Castor and Pollux and the Temple of Vesta, near the Porticus Julia and the Arcus Fabiorum (arch of the Fabii). No remains of this puteal, however, have been discovered. It was once thought that an irregular circle of travertine blocks found near the Temple of Castor formed part of the puteal, but this idea was abandoned in the early 20th century.

A coin issued in 62 BC by Lucius Scribonius Libo (praetor 80 BC) depicts this puteal, which he had renovated. It resembles a cippus (sepulchral monument) or an altar, with laurel wreaths, two lyres and a pair of pincers or tongs below the wreaths. The tongs may be those of Vulcan, emblematic of him as a forger of lightning.
