= Scipio Nasica =

Scipio Nasica was the name of several members of the Scipiones, a branch of the patrician Roman gens Cornelia. Metellus Scipio was born into this family, but was later adopted out to the gens Caecilia. He still retained his former name by combining it with that of his adoptive father.

This name may refer to:

- Publius Cornelius Scipio Nasica (consul 191 BC) (b. 227 BC), son of Gnaeus Cornelius Scipio Calvus.
- Publius Cornelius Scipio Nasica Corculum (d. 141 BC), son of the above, consul in 162 and 155 BC, pontifex maximus in 150 BC, and princeps senatus in 147 BC.
- Publius Cornelius Scipio Nasica Serapio, son of the above, pontifex maximus in 141 BC and consul in 138 BC. The murderer of Tiberius Gracchus.
- Publius Cornelius Scipio Nasica (consul 111 BC), son of the above. Some sources mistakenly call him Serapio like his father.
- Quintus Caecilius Metellus Pius Scipio Nasica (d. 46 BC), grandson of the above, consul in 52 BC, adopted by Quintus Caecilius Metellus Pius.
