= Lucius Scribonius Libo =

Several men of plebeian status were named Lucius Scribonius Libo during the Roman Republic and Roman Empire; they were members of the gens Scribonia.

== L. Scribonius Libo (praetor 204 BC) ==
Lucius Scribonius Libo was a tribune of the plebs in 216 BC, during the Second Punic War. A question arose pertaining to the ransoming of Roman captives; he referred the matter to the Senate. He was one of the three men appointed triumviri mensarii, a commission created by a Lex Minucia, possibly to deal with a shortage of silver; the full range of their financial activities is unclear. He was praetor peregrinus in 204 and sent to Cisalpine Gaul.

== L. Scribonius Libo (tribune 149 BC) ==
Lucius Scribonius Libo was tribune of the plebs in 149 BC. He accused Servius Sulpicius Galba for the outrages against the Lusitanians he committed during his governorship. He might have been the Scribonius who consecrated the Puteal Scribonianum often mentioned by ancient writers, which was located in the forum close to the Arcus Fabianus. It was called Puteal as it was opened at the top, like a well. Years later it would be repaired and dedicated by another Libo, praetor of 80 BC.

== L. Scribonius Libo (praetor 80 BC) ==
Lucius Scribonius Libo (fl. 1st century BC) was praetor urbanus in 80 BC.

== L. Scribonius Libo (triumvir monetalis 62 BC) ==
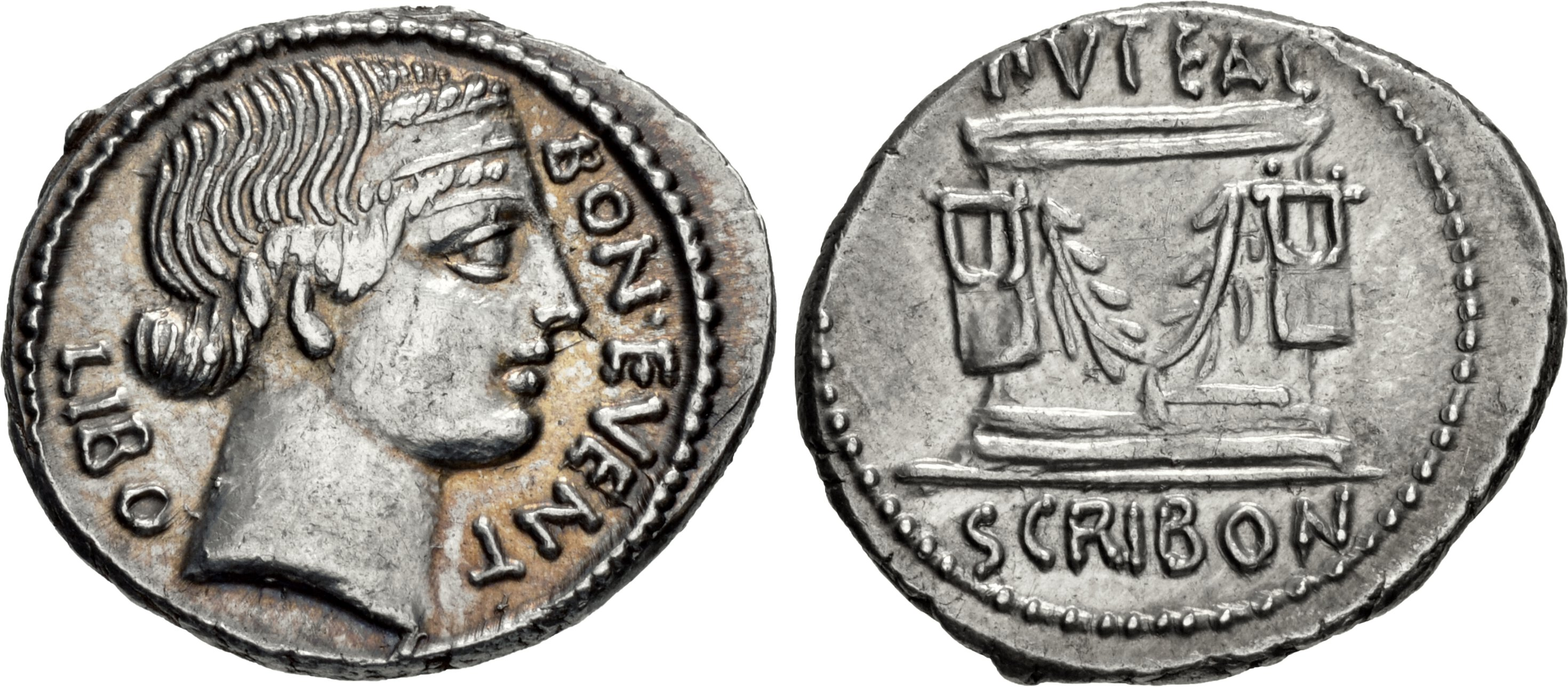
Denarius of L. Scribonius Libo, 62 BC. Bonus Eventus is portrayed on the obverse, while the reverse features the Puteal Scribonianum.

Scribonius was triumvir monetalis in 62 BC. The denarii he minted feature the Puteal Scribonianum and the head of Bonus Eventus, probably to celebrate the repression of Catilina's Conspiracy.

== L. Scribonius Libo (consul 34 BC) ==
Lucius Scribonius Libo (fl. 1st century BC) was the son of the above, and possibly the elder brother or half-brother of Scribonia, first wife of Augustus. His wife was a member of the gens Sulpicia.

When the civil war broke in 49 BC he sided with Pompey and was in command of Etruria. Afterward he accompanied Pompey to Greece. Following the death of Bibulus he was given command of the Pompeian fleet. During the civil wars that occurred after the assassination of Julius Caesar, he sided with his son-in-law Sextus Pompey who married his daughter Scribonia. In 40 BC Octavian, married his sister. He had his only natural child through the marriage, Julia. After this marriage a peace was made between the Triumvirs (Second Triumvirate) and Sextus with the Pact of Misenum in 39 BC. After the war was renewed in 36 BC, Scribonius felt the cause was lost and abandoned Sextus.

In 34 BC he was consul with Mark Antony.

== L. Scribonius Libo (consul 16) ==
Lucius Scribonius Libo (died 16) was a consul in 16. This nobleman was brother of Marcus Scribonius Libo Drusus, who was accused of planning to revolt against the Roman emperor Tiberius, who also charged Libo in planning a revolt against the emperor and stabbed him to death in 16. They were likely the sons or paternal grandsons of Marcus Livius Drusus Libo (adopted brother of empress Livia). It is possible that he was Marcus Livius' nephew who was adopted.
