= Marcus Livius Drusus Libo =

Roman consul

- Children: Livia Scriboniana; Marcus Scribonius Libo Drusus (possibly adopted)
- Father: Lucius Scribonius Libo; Marcus Livius Drusus Claudianus (adoptive)
- Relatives: Livia Drusilla (adoptive sister)

Marcus Livius Drusus Libo was an ancient Roman consul of the early Roman Empire. He was the son of Lucius Scribonius Libo and adopted brother of the empress Livia. His natural paternal aunt was Scribonia, the second wife of Augustus, as a consequence of which he was a maternal first cousin of Julia the Elder.

== Biography ==
He is believed to have been adopted by Marcus Livius Drusus Claudianus, the father of Livia Drusilla, who was the third wife of Augustus.

However, as a result of his 'L.f.' filiation attested in Book 54 of the Roman History of Cassius Dio, it is believed that his adoption was only testamentary (whereby the adoptee is permitted to use, and therefore carry on, the name of the adoptor).

The career of Marcus Livius Drusus Libo is largely unknown, except that he was ordinary consul in 15 BC with Lucius Calpurnius Piso. Livius Drusus served as an aedile in 28 BC, shortly before the Pantheon in Rome was completed. Historian Pliny the Elder mentions him among those in Rome who hosted the Secular Games during Augustus' reign. There is also a possibility that he was a member of the Arval Brethren.

== Marriage and family ==
No wife is attested for Marcus Livius Drusus Libo, but there has been speculation that he was married to a Pompeia. Christian Settipani has speculated that she may have been a Cornelia. Livia Medullina Camilla, whom Claudius was intended to marry in AD 8, but who died on the day of their wedding, is assumed to be Libo's granddaughter, based on her name. Her name suggests that she was the daughter of Marcus Furius Camillus and a woman named 'Livia', supposed to have been the daughter of Marcus Livius Drusus Libo. Libo's otherwise unattested wife has been nicknamed Livia Scriboniana by historians.

Marcus Scribonius Libo Drusus and Lucius Scribonius Libo, consul in AD 16, may have been Libo's sons or grandsons, or perhaps adopted fraternal nephews.

== Footnotes ==
Political offices
Preceded by Lucius Domitius Ahenobarbus, and Lucius Tarius Rufus	Consul of the Roman Empire; 15 BC with Lucius Calpurnius Piso	Succeeded by Marcus Licinius Crassus Frugi, and Gnaeus Cornelius Lentulus Augur
