= Marcus Scribonius Libo Drusus =

Roman senator accused of conspiring against the Roman Emperor Tiberius

Marcus Scribonius Libo Drusus (died 13 September 16) was a Roman accused of treason against the emperor Tiberius.

== Biography ==
=== Early life ===
He was likely the son or paternal grandson of Marcus Livius Drusus Libo (adopted brother of empress Livia). It is also possible that he was Marcus Livius's nephew who was adopted. Libo Drusus was regarded as a fatuous young man, who had tastes for absurdities.

=== Trial ===
Along with his brother Lucius Scribonius Libo, he was accused of conspiring against the Roman Emperor Tiberius. This included asking a fortune-teller if he would be rich enough to pave the Via Appia, as far as Brundisium or Brindisi with money. Tacitus described the accusations against Libo as 'preposterous' and 'pointless'.

The two men were tried in a senatorial court by the Emperor Tiberius. At the trial, Marcus was ill and pleaded for mercy. A maternal relative, Publius Sulpicius Quirinus, defended them and appealed to the Emperor. Tiberius told him to apply to the senate.

Tiberius wanted to investigate Libo's slaves but there was a senatorial decree preventing confessions from tortured slaves from being used in trials against their own masters. To get around this Tiberius had Libo's slaves sold to the treasury agent, then the accusations made against Libo were considered confirmed by Libo's ex slaves.

Libo's aunt, Scribonia (second wife of Roman Emperor Augustus), tried to convince Marcus to face trial rather than commit suicide. However, Marcus committed suicide by stabbing himself twice in the stomach on 13 September 16 AD. The Roman Senate agreed to divide his property among his accusers, which was the common practice of the time. Furthermore, his statue and funeral masks were removed from descendants' funeral parades and members of the gens ‘Scribonius’ were forbidden to bear the name ‘Drusus’. His supporters were executed, and the day of his death was declared a public holiday.

== Bibliography ==
- Pettinger, Andrew (2012). The Republic in Danger: Drusus Libo and the Succession of Tiberius. OUP Oxford. ISBN 9780199601745.

== Sources ==
- Tacitus - The Annals of Imperial Rome - Chapter 4 - The First Treason Trials
- Lucius Annaeus Seneca - Letters to Lucilius, Letter 70, chapter 10
- Suetonius - The Twelve Caesars - Tiberius, Paragraph 25 Accession
