= Bidental =

Shrine on a lightning strike site in ancient Roman religion

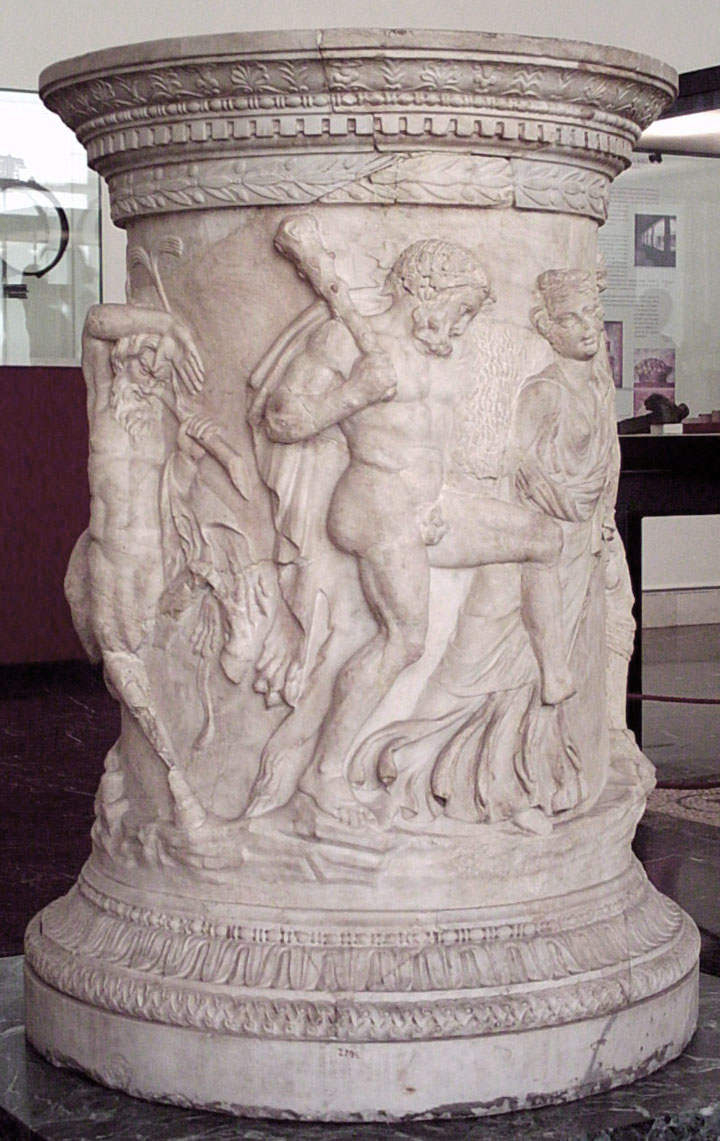
A Bacchic Roman puteal ("wellhead") of the Neo-Attic style, inspired by Hellenistic art. Relief shows figures a Bacchic procession: a drunk Hercules (in centre) wears the skin of the Nemean lion and carries his olivewood club.

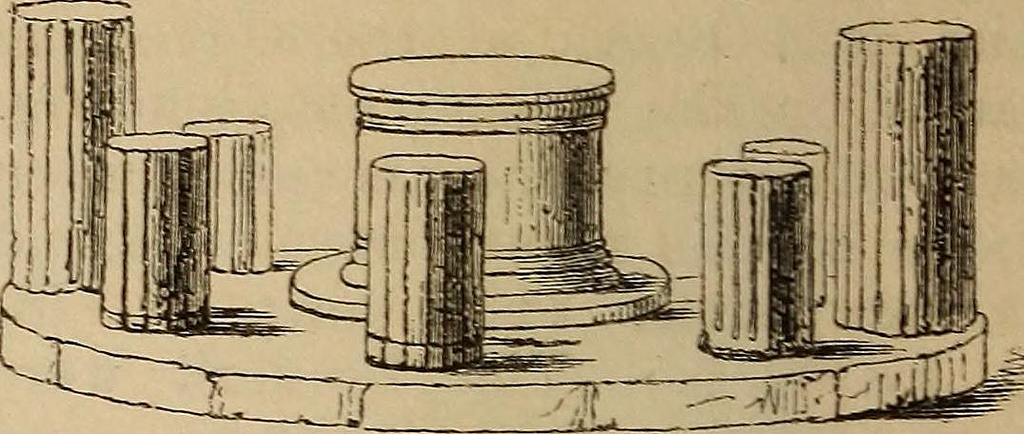
Bidental drawing

In ancient Roman religion, a bidental was a sacred shrine erected on the spot where lightning had struck.

== Creation ==
Any remains and scorched earth at the spot were to be burned in a hole at the location by priests called "bidentales". Any person killed by the bolt was to be buried in the earth where the lightning hit, as opposed to traditional cremation.

A puteal ("wellhead"), one or sometimes more, was then placed on the spot of burned earth. In order to further consecrate the site, the officiant would sacrifice a two-year-old sheep (called a bidens). Finally, an altar was built, and surrounded by a wall or fence to keep any trespassers away. Occasionally when falling into a state of decay, Bidentals would be repaired or reconstructed.

== Significance ==
Considered sacred space, a bidental was not to be touched, trod upon, or even looked at after completion.

Places being struck by lightning were regarded as a terrifying example of divine wrath, and not to be taken lightly. Had a person committed sacrilege, they were punished severely with frenzy. Primarily, it was believed that these shows of divine power were displayed specifically by Jupiter, Roman god of the sky and thunder as well as king of the gods.
