= 10s BC =

Decade

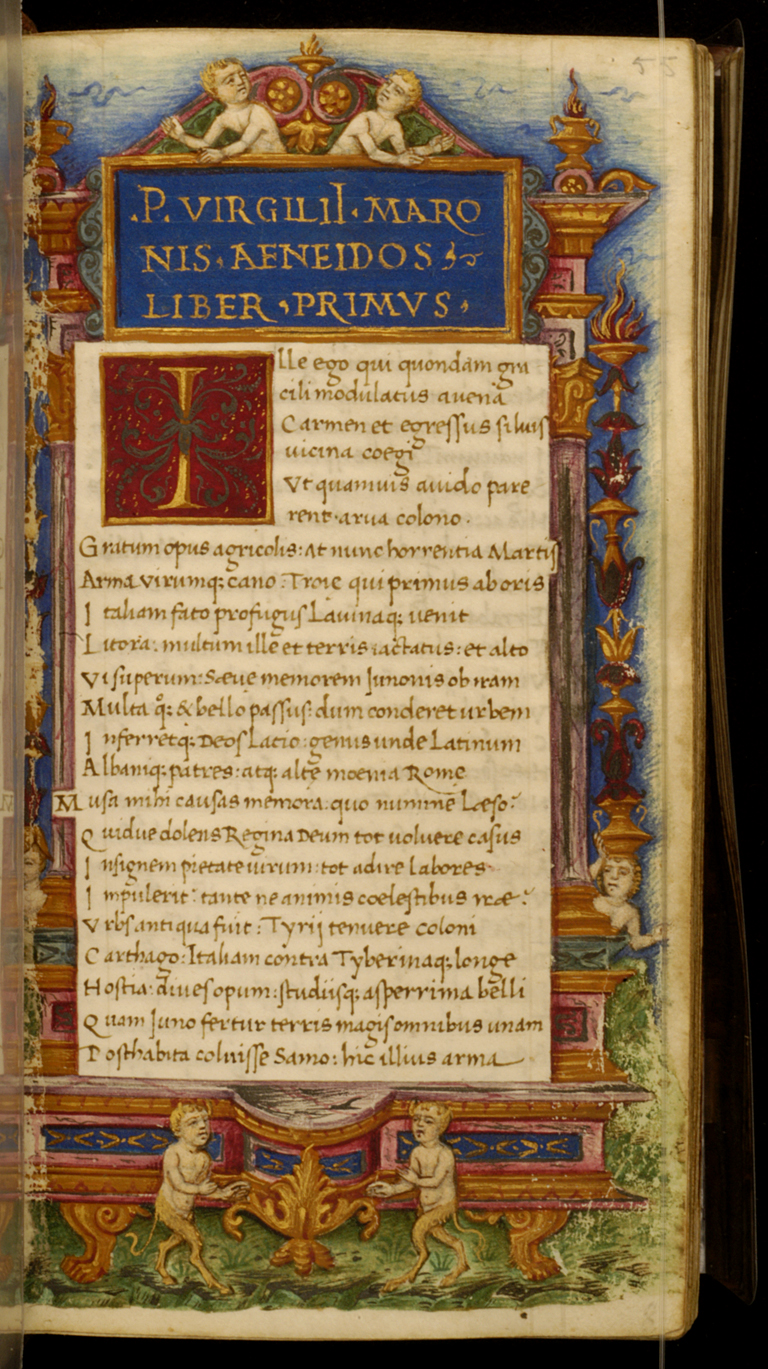
The Aeneid is published in 19 BC, after the death of Virgil earlier that year.

The 10s BC were the period 19 BC – 10 BC.

== 19 BC ==
=== Roman Empire ===
- The Aeneid by the Roman poet Virgil is published after his death. The Aeneid is an epic poem in 12 books that tells the story of the foundation of Rome from the ashes of Troy.
- In Rome, Lucius Cornelius Balbus receives the honor of a triumph on the Forum Romanum, for his victories over the Garamantes in Africa.
- Marcus Vipsanius Agrippa completes the Aqua Virgo; the aqueduct is 21 km (13 mi) in length and supplies the city of Rome with about 100,000,000 liters of water every day.
- The Cantabrians, living on the northernmost coast of Spain, are brought under Roman control. The region is completely subdued until 16 BC.
- King Herod the Great begins renovation of the Temple in Jerusalem.

=== Asia ===
- King Yuri becomes ruler of the Korean kingdom of Goguryeo.

== 18 BC ==
=== Roman empire ===
- Caesar Augustus introduces the Lex Julia (Julian Laws):
  - Lex Iulia de Ambitu penalised bribery when acquiring political offices.
  - Lex Iulia de maritandis ordinibus introduced penalties and incentives to promote marriage, and forbade marriage of senators, as well as of their children, to prostitutes and to freedmen.

=== Asia ===
- Onjo becomes the first ruler of the Korean kingdom of Baekje (traditional date).

== 17 BC ==
=== Roman Empire ===
- Emperor Augustus adopts Gaius and Lucius Caesar.
- Emperor Augustus celebrates the secular games in Rome, for which Horace's hymn the "Carmen Saeculare" is commissioned.

== 16 BC ==
=== Roman Empire ===
- The Noricans having joined with the Pannonians in invading Histria, are defeated by Publius Silius Nerva, proconsul of Illyricum.
- Braga, Portugal is founded.
- Noricum is incorporated into the Roman Empire.
- Caesar Augustus reorganizes the German provinces, making Trier their capital.
- Clades Lolliana: Roman consul Marcus Lollius is defeated by a Germanic horde.
- Construction of the Roman temple of Maison Carrée at Nîmes in Gallia Narbonensis (approximate date).

== 15 BC ==
=== Roman Empire ===
- The Raeti tribes of the Alps are subjugated by Tiberius and Nero Claudius Drusus and the new Roman province of Raetia is established with Chur (in modern-day Switzerland) as its capital. During the campaign, Roman triremes destroy the fleet of the Vindelici in the Battle of Lake Constance. Augsburg is founded as Augusta Vindelicorum; and Legio XXI Rapax is stationed at Regensburg in the new province.
- Drusus decides to improve the passage through the Alps for military control of Noricum and Raetia and builds the Via Claudia Augusta through Italy.
- Marcus Livius Drusus Libo and Lucius Calpurnius Piso are Roman Consuls.

== 14 BC ==
=== Roman Empire ===
- The Roman general Nero Claudius Drusus fortifies Augusta Vangionum, the modern city of Worms, Germany.
- Caesar Augustus makes Beeroth (modern Beirut) a colonia, named Colonia Julia Augusta Felix Berytus.
- Winter – The Roman Legio X Fretensis is stationed in Syria, and the legionaries are settled at the ancient city of Beirut.

== 13 BC ==
=== Roman Empire ===
- Tiberius Claudius Nero and Publius Quinctilius Varus are Roman Consuls.
- The Roman general Nero Claudius Drusus builds the stronghold of castrum Moguntiacum in the location of the modern-day city of Mainz, Germany.
- Drusus is granted governor of Gaul and mobilises a Roman army to beat the Germans back across the Rhine. He travels to the North Sea and pays tribute to the Frisii.
- The Ara Pacis Augustae ("Altar of Augustan Peace") is commissioned by the Roman Senate to honor the triumphal return of Emperor Augustus from Hispania and Gaul.
- Revolt in Thrace against Roman rule led by Vologases.

== 12 BC ==
=== Roman Empire ===
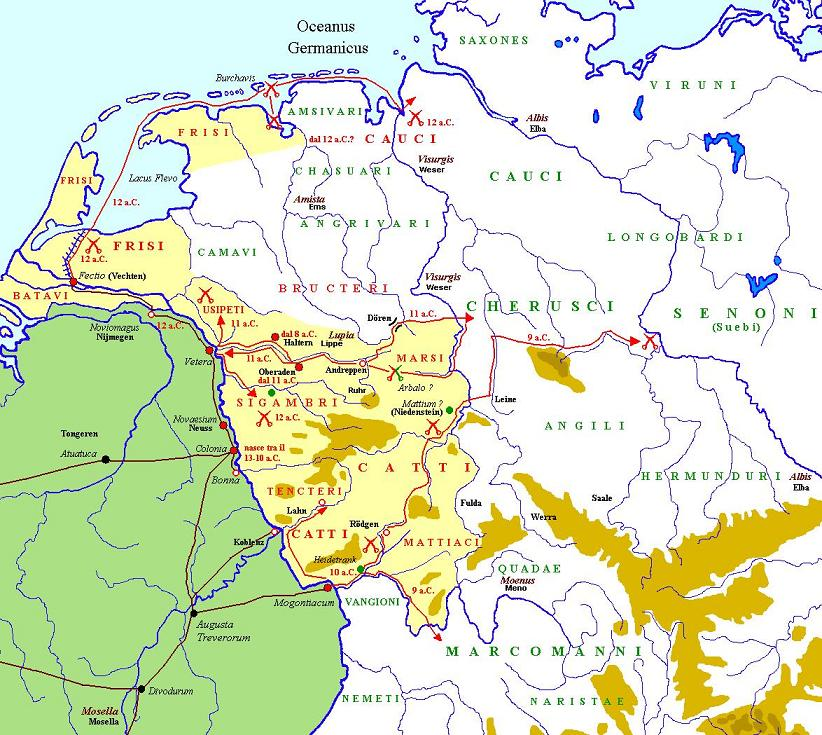
Drusus' battles with Germanic tribes (12–9 BC)

- Marcus Valerius Messalla Appianus and Publius Sulpicius Quirinius are Roman consuls.
- Tiberius Claudius Nero summoned to Pannonia due to severe revolt by the Delmatae.
- Roman armies based at Xanten, Cologne and Mainz campaign beyond the Rhine.
- First official mention of Argentoratum, the city known in modern times as Strasbourg.
- Emperor Augustus is given the title Pontifex Maximus.
- Approximate date – Pyramid of Cestius erected in Rome.

=== India ===
- King Azes II dies. The rule of the Indo-Scythians crumbles as the Kushans, one of the five tribes of the Yuezhi who live in Bactria expand into India to create a Kushan Empire.

=== Astronomy ===
- Halley's Comet makes an appearance, as recorded by Chinese Astronomers for about 56 days. Written in the Annal of Han as "In the first year of Yuan Yen (12 B.C.), in the Autumn the seventh month, on the day Sing Wei, a comet swept in Gemini, went through Pollux and Castor, and passed over Leo and Virgo. It was then behind the sun about six degrees, and appeared in the east earlier in the morning. After thirteen days the comet became an evening star shining in the west, whence it swept over Arcturus, moved slowly to Serpens, and reached Ophiuchus. After 56 days it disappeared in Scorpio."

== 11 BC ==
=== Roman Empire ===
- Quintus Aelius Tubero and Paullus Fabius Maximus are Roman Consuls.
- Battle of the Lupia River: Roman forces under Augustus's stepson Nero Claudius Drusus win a victory in Germania.
- Battle of Arbalo: Roman forces under Augustus's stepson Nero Claudius Drusus beat off a German ambush.
- May – Drusus secures the Rhine frontier and builds Roman fortresses near Bonn, Dorsten, Haltern, and Oberaden.

== 10 BC ==
=== Roman Empire ===
- The Obelisk of Montecitorio is brought from Egypt to Rome by Emperor Augustus to be erected as a sundial gnomon of the Solarium Augusti. It is now in the Piazza Montecitorio.
- The Romans build a bridge across the Rhine near Bonn (approximate date).
- A Roman military camp is established at Speyer (Germany).

== Names of years ==
| Anno Domini name | Year of the Consulship of | Ab urbe condita |
|---|---|---|
| 10 BC | Maximus and Antonius | 744 |
| 11 BC | Tubero and Maximus | 743 |
| 12 BC | Messalla and Quirinius | 742 |
| 13 BC | Nero and Varus | 741 |
| 14 BC | Crassus and Lentulus | 740 |
| 15 BC | Drusus and Piso | 739 |
| 16 BC | Ahenobarbus and Scipio | 738 |
| 17 BC | Furnius and Silanus | 737 |
| 18 BC | Lentulus and Lentulus | 736 |
| 19 BC | Saturninus and Vespillo | 735 |

== Births ==
- 19 BC
  - Vipsania Julia Agrippina, daughter of Marcus Vipsanius Agrippa and Julia the Elder
- 18 BC
  - Arminius, Chieftain of the Germanic Cherusci and a former officer (d. AD 21)
- 17 BC
  - December 11 – Gnaeus Domitius Ahenobarbus, son of Lucius Domitius Ahenobarbus and Antonia Major (d. AD 40)
  - Arminius, Germanic chieftain who defeated the Romans at the Battle of the Teutoburg Forest (d. AD 21)
  - Lucius Caesar, son of Marcus Vipsanius Agrippa and Julia the Elder (d. AD 2)
- 15 BC
  - May 24 – Germanicus, Roman general (d. AD 19)
  - Alexander, Herodian prince of Judea
  - Phaedrus, Roman fabulist and writer
- 14 BC
  - Agrippina the Elder, daughter of Marcus Vipsanius Agrippa and Julia the Elder (d. AD 33)
  - Claudia Pulchra, daughter of Paullus Aemilius Lepidus and Claudia Marcella Minor (d. AD 26)
  - Drusus Julius Caesar, son of the Emperor Tiberius and step-grandson of the Emperor Augustus (d. AD 23)
  - Ma Yuan, Chinese general of the Han dynasty (d. AD 49)
- 13 BC
  - Artaxias III, Roman client king of Armenia (d. AD 34)
  - Livilla, daughter of Nero Claudius Drusus and Antonia Minor (d. AD 31)
- 12 BC
  - Agrippa Postumus, son of Julia the Elder and grandson of Augustus (d. AD 14)
- 11 BC
  - Herod Agrippa, king of Judea (d. AD 44)
- 10 BC
  - August 1 – Claudius, Roman emperor (d. AD 54)
  - Antonia Tryphaena, Thracian princess
  - Thusnelda, Germanic noblewoman (approximate date)

== Deaths ==
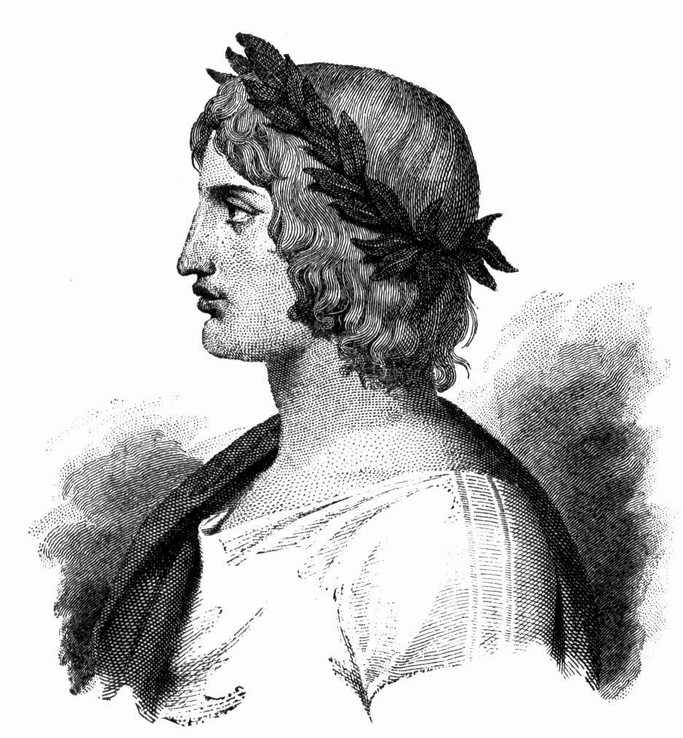
Depiction of Virgil (70 BC–19 BC)

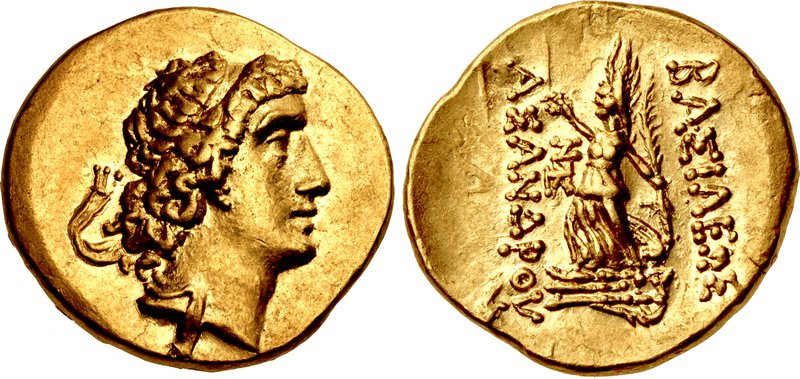
Coin of King Asander (110 BC–17 BC)

- 19 BC
  - September 21 – Virgil, Roman poet (b. 70 BC)
  - Albius Tibullus, Roman poet (b. 54 BC)
  - Dongmyeong, Korean king of Goguryeo
- 18 BC
  - Cornelia, daughter of Scribonia (second wife of Augustus)
- 17 BC
  - Asander, Roman client king of the Bosporan Kingdom (b. 110 BC)
- 16 BC
  - Aemilius Macer, Roman didactic poet and writer
  - Scribonius, Roman client king of the Bosporan Kingdom
  - Wang, Chinese empress of the Western Han dynasty
- 15 BC
  - Lucius Munatius Plancus, Roman consul (b. c. 87 BC)
  - Vedius Pollio, Roman equestrian (friend of Augustus)
- 14 BC
  - Lucius Varius Rufus, Roman Latin poet and writer
  - Sulpicia, wife of Lucius Cornelius Lentulus
- 13 BC
  - Marcus Aemilius Lepidus, Roman consul (b. c. 90 BC)
  - Paullus Aemilius Lepidus, Roman consul (b. c. 77 BC)
  - Rhescuporis II, king of the Odrysian Kingdom
- 12 BC
  - Gaius Caninius Rebilus, Roman senator and suffect consul
  - Marcus Valerius Messalla Appianus, Roman consul (b. c. 45 BC)
  - Marcus Vipsanius Agrippa, Roman statesman (b. c. 63 BC)
  - Mithridates III, king of Commagene (Armenia)
  - Sextius Propertius, Roman Latin poet and writer (b. c. 50–45 BC)
- 11 BC
  - Octavia the Younger, sister of Augustus (b. 69 BC)
- 10 BC
  - Amanirenas, queen regnant of the Kingdom of Kush (approximate date).
  - Tryphon, Greek grammarian (b. c. 60 BC)
