= Quinctilia gens =

Ancient Roman family

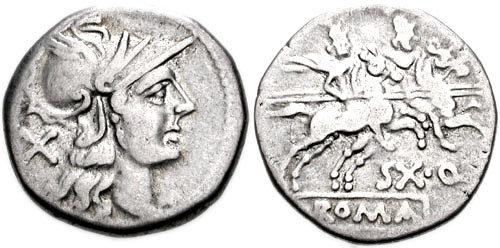
Denarius of Sextus Quinctilius. The reverse shows the Dioscuri riding on horseback.

The gens Quinctilia, also written Quintilia, was a patrician family at ancient Rome, dating from the earliest period of Roman history, and continuing well into imperial times. Despite its great antiquity, the gens never attained much historical importance. The only member who obtained the consulship under the Republic was Sextus Quinctilius in 453 BC. The gens produced numerous praetors and other magistrates, but did not obtain the consulship again for over four hundred years.

== Origin ==
The nomen Quinctilius is a patronymic surname, based on the praenomen Quintus, meaning "fifth". Quinctilius is the correct orthography, but Quintilius is also quite common. The gens Quinctia is derived from the same praenomen. It was not unusual for multiple nomina to be derived from a common source; the Sabine name Pompo is the Oscan equivalent of Quintus, and gave rise to the gentes Pompilia and Pomponia.

According to legend, the Quinctilii predated the founding of Rome. When the brothers Romulus and Remus had restored their grandfather, Numitor, to the throne of Alba Longa, they set out to establish a new city in the hills overlooking the Tiber. They offered up sacrifices in the cave of the Lupercal at the base of the Palatine Hill, which rite became the origin of the religious festival of the Lupercalia. The followers of Romulus were called the Quinctilii or Quinctiliani, while those of Remus were the Fabii or Fabiani.

In historic times, the two colleges of priests, known as Luperci, who carried out the sacred rituals of the Lupercalia, were known by these names, suggesting that in the earliest times, the gentes Quinctilia and Fabia superintended these rites as a sacrum gentilicium. Another example of such responsibilities concerned the Pinarii and the Potitii, who maintained the worship of Hercules. Such sacred rites were gradually transferred to the state, or opened to the Roman populus; a well-known legend attributed the destruction of the Potitii to the abandonment of their religious office. In later times, the privilege of the Lupercalia had ceased to be confined to the Fabii and the Quinctilii.

== Praenomina ==
The principal names used by the Quinctilii were Publius and Sextus. A few of the Quinctilii bore the praenomina Lucius, Marcus, and Titus. Although the name must have been used by one of their ancestors, none of the Quinctilii known to history were named Quintus.

== Branches and cognomina ==
The only family-name of the Quinctilii under the Republic is Varus, a common surname meaning "bent, crooked," or "knock-kneed." Other cognomina are found in imperial times.

== Members ==
This list includes abbreviated praenomina. For an explanation of this practice, see filiation.

- Publius Quinctilius, the grandfather of Sextus Quinctilius, the consul of 453 BC.
- Sextus Quinctilius P. f. Varus, father of Sextus, the consul of 453 BC.
- Sextus Quinctilius Sex. f. P. n., consul in 453 BC, died in the pestilence of that year.

=== Quinctilii Vari ===
- Lucius Quinctilius, grandfather of Marcus Quinctilius Varus, the consular tribune.
- Lucius Quinctilius L. f., father of the consular tribune Marcus Quinctilius Varus.
- Marcus Quinctilius L. f. L. n. Varus, consular tribune in 403 BC.
- Gnaeus Quinctilius, named by Livy as the dictator of 331 BC; apparently a mistake for Gnaeus Quinctius Capitolinus.
- Publius Quinctilius Varus, praetor in 203 BC, he was assigned to Ariminum. Together with Marcus Cornelius Cethegus, the proconsul, he defeated Mago, the brother of Hannibal, in the territory of the Insubres.
- Marcus Quinctilius P. f. Varus, distinguished himself in the battle in which his father defeated Mago.
- Titus Quinctilius Varus, served in Hispania in 185 BC, as the legate of the praetor Gaius Calpurnius Piso.
- Publius Quinctilius Varus, Flamen Martialis, died in 169 BC.
- Publius Quinctilius Varus, praetor in 166 BC.
- Publius Quinctilius Varus, mentioned by Cicero in his oration for Quinctius in 81 BC, and again in his oration for Cluentius as one of the witnesses in the trial of Scamander.
- Sextus Quinctilius Varus, praetor in 57 BC, favored Cicero's recall from banishment.
- Sextus Quinctilius Varus, quaestor in 49 BC, and father of Publius Quinctilius Varus, the consul of 13 BC. He was a partisan of Pompeius, and twice pardoned by Caesar during the Civil War, he later joined Brutus and Cassius, and fell at the Battle of Philippi in 42.
- Quinctilius Varus, a native of Cremona, and an eminent critic; he was a friend of both Horace and Vergil, who died in 24 BC.
- Publius Quinctilius Sex. f. Varus, consul in 13 BC with Tiberius, the future emperor; he was subsequently appointed governor of Syria, and later of Germania. In AD 9, he was defeated and killed by a coalition of Germanic tribes at the Battle of Teutoburg Forest, with the loss of three legions.
- Quinctilia Sex. f., sister of the consul of 13 BC and wife of Publius Cornelius Dolabella the consul of 35 BC.
- Quinctilia Sex. f., a sister of Publius Quinctilius Varus, the consul of 13 BC, was the wife of Sextus Appuleius, consul in 29 BC.
- Quinctilia Sex. f., another sister of Publius Quinctilius Varus, the consul of 13 BC, was the wife of Lucius Nonius Asprenas, one of the epulones, who was accused of poisoning his guests at a banquet. Two of their sons would hold the consulship late in the reign of Augustus.
- Quinctilius P. f. Sex. n. Varus, the son of Publius Quinctilius Varus, consul in 13 BC, was a kinsman of Tiberius, but was accused by Gnaeus Domitius Afer in AD 27.
- Quinctilia P. f. Sex. n., daughter of Quinctilius Varus and Plautia Laterana.

=== Others ===
- Quintilia, an actress and dancer during the reign of Caligula. She was a lover of the senator Pompedius.
- Publius Quintilius P.f. Valens Varius, panegyriarch of an Artemis temple in Ephesus in 118.
- Quintilia P. f. P. n. Varilla, daughter of the above, priestess of Artemis at Ephesus.
- Quinctilius, a gem engraver, of unknown time. Two of his works are extant; one depicts Neptune drawn by two sea-horses, cut in beryl; the other is a nude Mercury.
- Sextus Quinctilius Condianus, consul with his brother, Maximus, in AD 151, both were subsequently put to death by Commodus.
- Sextus Quinctilius Valerius Maximus, consul with his brother, Condianus, in AD 151.
- Sextus Quinctilius Sex. f. Condianus, son of Sextus Quinctilius Maximus, and consul in AD 180; he was governor of Syria when his father and uncle were put to death. Anticipating a similar fate, he faked his death and escaped.

== See also ==
- List of Roman gentes

== Bibliography ==
- Marcus Tullius Cicero, Philippicae, Post Reditum in Senatu, Pro Caelio, Pro Cluentio, Pro Quinctio.
- Sextus Aurelius Propertius, Elegiae (Elegies).
- Quintus Horatius Flaccus (Horace), Satirae (Satires).
- Dionysius of Halicarnassus, Romaike Archaiologia (Roman Antiquities).
- Publius Ovidius Naso (Ovid), Fasti.
- Titus Livius (Livy), History of Rome.
- Valerius Maximus, Factorum ac Dictorum Memorabilium (Memorable Facts and Sayings).
- Lucius Annaeus Seneca (Seneca the Elder), Controversiae.
- Publius Cornelius Tacitus, Annales.
- Plutarchus, Lives of the Noble Greeks and Romans.
- Sextus Pompeius Festus, Epitome de M. Verrio Flacco de Verborum Significatu (Epitome of Marcus Verrius Flaccus' On the Meaning of Words).
- Lucius Cassius Dio (Cassius Dio), Roman History.
- Philostratus, Lives of the Sophists.
- Aelius Lampridius, Aelius Spartianus, Flavius Vopiscus, Julius Capitolinus, Trebellius Pollio, and Vulcatius Gallicanus, Historia Augusta (Augustan History).
- Sextus Aurelius Victor (attributed), De Origo Gentis Romanae (On the Origin of the Roman People).
- Eusebius Sophronius Hieronymus (St. Jerome), In Chronicon Eusebii (The Chronicon of Eusebius).
- Digesta, or Pandectae (The Digest).
- Philipp von Stosch, Gemmae Antiquae Caelatae (Ancient Carved Gemstones), Bernard Picart, Amsterdam (1724).
- Domenico Agostino Bracci, Commentaria de Antiquis Scalptoribus qui sua Nomina Inciderunt in Gemmis et Cammeis (Commentary on Ancient Sculptors whose Names are Carved on Gemstones and Cameos), Gaetano Cambiagi, Florence (1784–1786).
- Jonathan Spilsbury, A Collection of Fifty Prints from Antique Gems, Boydell, London (1785).
- August Weichert, De L. Varii et Cassii Parmensis Vita et Carminibus (The Lives and Poems of Lucius Varius Rufus and Gaius Cassius Parmensis), Grimma (1836).
- Dictionary of Greek and Roman Biography and Mythology, William Smith, ed., Little, Brown and Company, Boston (1849).
- George Davis Chase, "The Origin of Roman Praenomina", in Harvard Studies in Classical Philology, vol. VIII (1897).
- D.P. Simpson, Cassell's Latin and English Dictionary, Macmillan Publishing Company, New York (1963).
- Ronald Syme, The Augustan Aristocracy, Clarendon Press, Oxford (1989).
- Jan Sewell, Clare Smout, The Palgrave Handbook of the History of Women on Stage, Springer Nature (2020).
- Van Tilborg, Sjef (1996). Reading John in Ephesius. Novum Testamentum / Supplements: Supplements to Novum Testamentum. Vol. 83 (illustrated ed.). BRILL. ISBN 9789004105300.
