= Paulus Aemilius =

Paulus Aemilius can refer to:

- Paullus Aemilius Lepidus (c. 77 BC – after 11 BC), Roman senator
- Paullus Aemilius Regillus (born c. 15/14 BC), Roman Senator
- Paulus Aemilius Veronensis (c. 1455 – 1529), Italian historian
- Paulus Aemilius (Hebrew scholar) (c. 1510 – 1575), Bavarian Hebrew teacher and bibliographer

== See also ==
- Lucius Aemilius Paullus (disambiguation)
