= Claudia Pulchra (disambiguation) =

Claudia Pulchra was the name of several women of Roman gens of Claudii during the 1st century BC and 1st century AD. The Latin pulchra (meaning 'beautiful') is the root of the English word pulchritude (meaning 'beauty').

Claudia Pulchra or Clodia Pulchra may refer to:

- Claudia Pulchra (wife of Gracchus), daughter of Appius Claudius Pulcher (consul 143 BC)
- Claudia Pulchra (wife of Philippus), daughter of Appius Claudius Pulcher (consul 143 BC)
- Claudia Pulchra (wife of Lucullus), eldest daughter of Appius Claudius Pulcher (consul 79 BC)
- Clodia Pulchra (wife of Metellus) (born Claudia, c. 95 or 94 BC), middle daughter of Appius Claudius Pulcher (consul 79 BC)
- Claudia Pulchra Major (1st century BC), elder daughter of Appius Claudius Pulcher (consul 54 BC)
- Claudia Pulchra Minor (1st century BC), younger daughter of Appius Claudius Pulcher (consul 54 BC)
- Claudia Pulchra (wife of Augustus) (1st-century BC), daughter of Publius Clodius Pulcher
- Claudia Pulchra (great-niece of Augustus) (14 BC-26), daughter of Claudia Marcella Minor
- Clodia Pulchra (mother of Pupienus), mother of Roman emperor Pupienus
