= Publius Quinctilius Varus the Younger =

1st century Roman senator

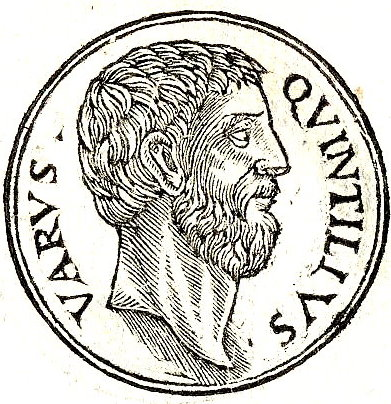
- Quinctilius Varus from Guillaume Rouillé's Promptuarii Iconum Insigniorum
- Born: 4 AD
- Died: 27 AD (aged 22-23)
- Other names: Publius Quinctilius Varus the Younger, Varus the Younger, Publius Quinctilius Varus filius and Quinctilius Varus
- Spouse: Plautia Laterana
- Children: Quinctilia
- Father: Varus

Publius Quinctilius Varus Minor (Minor in Latin means 'the younger') (AD 4 – AD 27) was a Roman senator.

== Family background ==
Varus was a member of the gens Quinctilia. He was the only child born to the Roman general and politician Publius Quinctilius Varus from his third wife Claudia Pulchra. Through his mother, Varus was a cousin to the future Roman empress Valeria Messalina. Claudia Pulchra was the sister of Messallina's father, the short-lived Marcus Valerius Messala Barbatus (died c. AD 20). Messallina had no brothers, but did have a younger half-brother Faustus Cornelius Sulla. Varus the younger was a generation removed from the children of Messalina, Claudia Octavia and Britannicus.

== Biography ==
=== Early life ===
Varus was born in Rome in the year 4 and was raised in the city. In late AD 6 or 7, his father was appointed to govern and organize the newly conquered Germania Inferior across the Rhine. But in September AD 9, due to his defeat at the Battle of the Teutoburg Forest Varus the Elder committed suicide. After the death of his father, his mother never remarried and in AD 26, Pulchra died in exile as a victim of the treason trials of Sejanus. Varus became wealthy through his parents' inheritance.

=== Victim of treason trials of Sejanus ===
In AD 27, Varus became another victim of the treason trials of the Palace Guardsman Sejanus. It is not known what Varus was charged with nor to what degree it was provoked; the charge may have been treason or maiestas. His accusers were the celebrated orator Domitius Afer and his cousin Publius Cornelius Dolabella. The outcome of the case is unknown as there is no further mention in the sources. The absence of his family from history leads some experts to conclude he was later condemned or committed suicide. However, a passage from Seneca the Elder suggests that Varus may have been acquitted: Seneca writes that Varus had a somewhat successful legal career, despite Lucius Cestius Pius taunting Varus with his father's defeat in the Teutoburg Forest.

== Personal life and issue ==
He had a large villa at Tivoli, Lazio.

Varus was betrothed to his distant maternal cousin Julia Livilla, one of the daughters of Agrippina the Elder and Germanicus, although they did not marry. Varus married a noblewoman called Plautia Laterana, by whom he had a daughter called Quinctilia.

== Sources ==
- J. R. Abdale, Four days in September: The Battle of Teutoburg (Google eBook), Trafford Publishing, 2013
- M. McNally, Teutoburg Forest, AD: 9 The Destruction of Varus and His Legions, Osprey Publishing, 2011
- R. Seager, Tiberius (Google eBook), John Wiley & Sons, 2008
- C. Settipani, Continuité gentilice et continuité sénatoriale dans les familles sénatoriales romaines à l'époque impériale, 2000
- A. Barrett, Agrippina: Sex, Power, and Politics in the Early Empire, Yale University Press, 1998
