= Publius Quinctilius Varus =

Roman general and politician (c. 46 BC - c. AD 9)

Legate Publius Quinctilius Varus
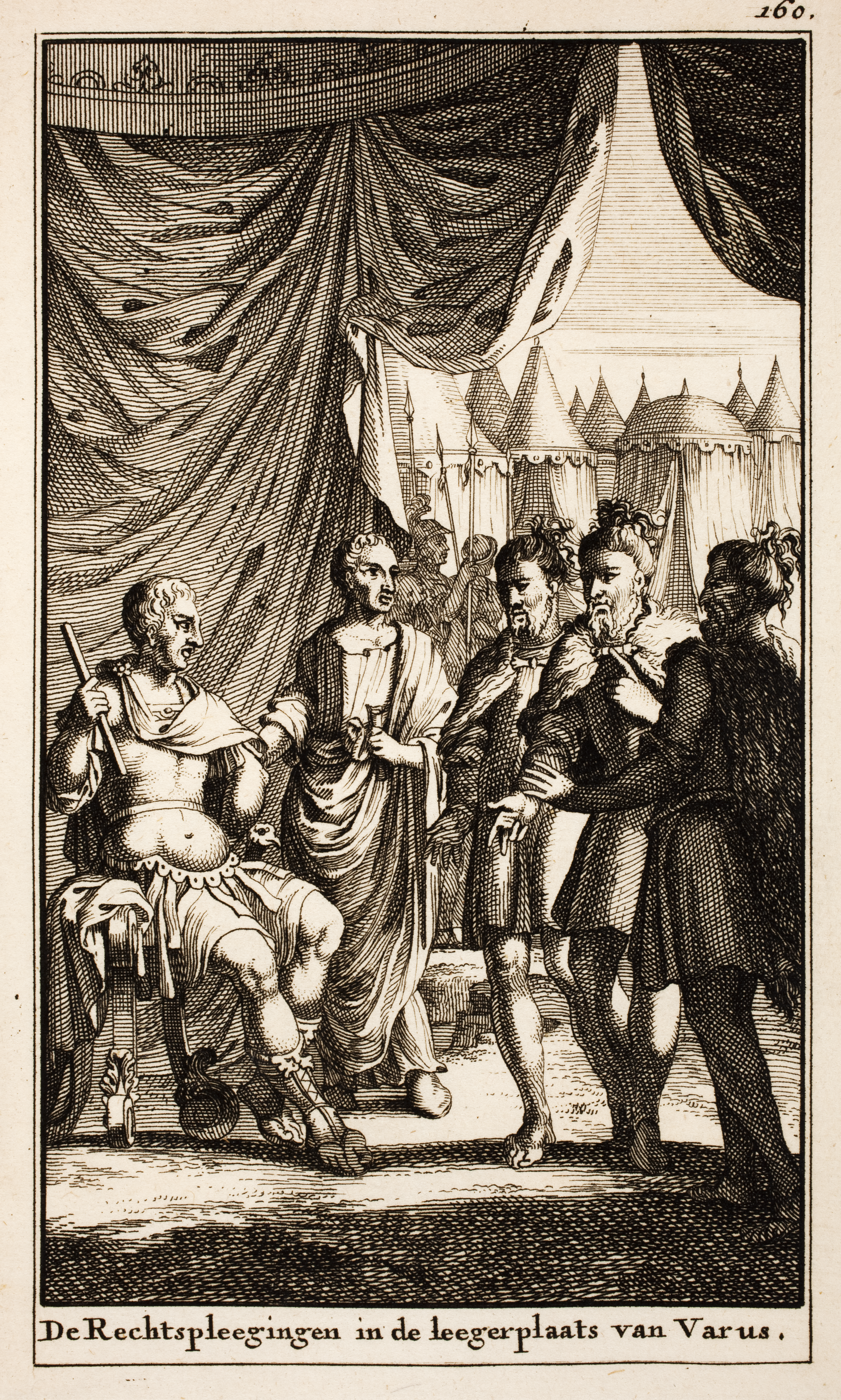
- Varus (left, sitting down), engraving from 1714
- Born: 46 BC or before Cremona, Roman Republic (now Italy)
- Died: September AD 9 (aged 54–55); Kalkriese, Germania (now Germany)
- Cause of death: Suicide via falling on the sword
- Children: Publius Quinctilius Varus the Younger
- Military career
- Allegiance: Roman Empire
- Branch: Roman army
- Rank: Governor (political)
- Commands: Legio XVII; Legio XVIII; Legio XIX
- Engagements: Jewish–Roman wars (preliminary); Jewish revolt in Judaea (4 BC); Germanic–Roman wars; Roman campaigns in Germania; Battle of the Teutoburg Forest (AD 9) †

Publius Quinctilius Varus (46 BC or before – September AD 9) was a Roman general and politician. Serving under Augustus, the founder of the Roman Empire, he is generally remembered for having lost three Roman legions in the Battle of the Teutoburg Forest and subsequently committing suicide to avoid capture (as well as execution) and shameful reproach. Varus's defeat to the Germanic tribes led by Arminius is considered to be one of the most important events in European history, as it dissuaded the Romans from further expanding into Germania and thus prevented the Romanization of the Germanic peoples to the east of the Rhine.

== Early life and family ==
Although he was a patrician by birth, Varus's family, the Quinctilii Vari, had long been impoverished and was unimportant; Ronald Syme notes, "The sole and last consul of that family", Sextus Quinctilius, "had been two years antecedent to the Decemvirs" (i.e., 453 BC). His father, Sextus Quinctilius Varus, was a senator who had served as a quaestor in 49 BC. This Sextus aligned with the Senatorial Party in the civil war against Julius Caesar. Although Sextus survived the defeat, it is unknown whether he was involved in the assassination of Julius Caesar. Sextus killed himself after the Battle of Philippi in 42 BC. The mother of Varus is unknown; Syme notes that "no relatives on either side of the family can be discovered or surmised."

Varus had three sisters, all named Quinctilia. They were probably all younger based on when they started having children, so it seems likely he was born at least four years before his father's suicide. The fact that they had advantageous marriages indicates someone was involved in their upbringing. One sister married Publius Cornelius Dolabella, consul of 35 BC; another married Sextus Appuleius, consul of 29 BC; and the third married Lucius Nonius Asprenas, son of the consul of 36 BC.

=== Marriages and children ===
Varus married Vipsania, the daughter of Marcus Agrippa, at an unknown date before 13 BC. Varus became a personal friend to Marcus Agrippa and Tiberius.

Vipsania later disappears from history. It is unknown whether she died or was divorced. Varus then married Claudia Pulchra, the daughter of Claudia Marcella Minor and the Roman consul of 12 BC, Marcus Valerius Messalla Appianus. Pulchra's maternal grandmother was Octavia the Younger, sister of Augustus. Hence, Pulchra was a grand-niece of Augustus. His marriage to Pulchra suggests that Varus still enjoyed political favor at this time. Pulchra bore Varus a son, also named Publius Quinctilius Varus.

== Political and military career ==
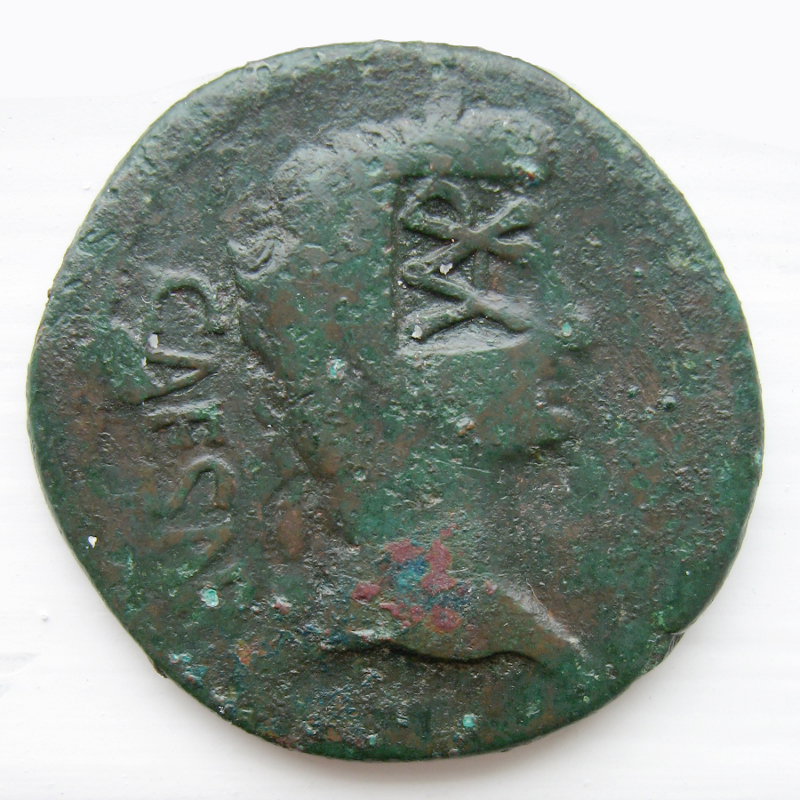
As Lugdunum I (RIC 230), countermarked "VAR" (Varus)

Despite his father's political allegiances, Varus became a supporter of Julius Caesar's heir, Augustus. Varus accompanied Augustus on a three-year tour of the eastern provinces between 22 BC and 19 BC, winning public acknowledgement while he was there. Around 15 BC, Varus spent a year or more serving as the legate of the 19th Legion while it was stationed at Dangstetten, as evidenced by a luggage-tag bearing his name and position excavated from the site. When Marcus Agrippa died in early 12 BC, Varus delivered the funeral eulogy alongside the future emperor Tiberius. With his political career thus boosted, he was elected consul in 13 BC as the colleague of Tiberius.

=== Governor of Africa, Syria, and Judaea ===
In 8–7 BC, Varus governed the African province. Later, he went on to govern Syria and Judaea in the Levant from 7–6 BC to 4 BC with four legions under his command. He was notorious for his harsh rule and high taxes.

==== Jewish revolt in Judaea (4 BC) ====
The Jewish historian Josephus mentions the swift action of Varus against a messianic revolt after the death of the Romans' Jewish client king Herod the Great in 4 BC. After occupying Jerusalem, he crucified 2000 Jews, making him one of the prime objects of popular resentment against Roman rule in Judaea.

Per archeological evidence, the people of Judaea took part in a popular full-scale boycott of Roman pottery (red slipware) in protest of Varus' cruelty. Following the massacre, Varus returned to Antioch.

=== Governor of Germania ===
Between 10 BC and 6 AD, Tiberius, his brother Drusus, Lucius Domitius Ahenobarbus, and Germanicus conducted long campaigns in Germania, the area north of the upper Danube and east of the Rhine, in an attempt at achieving a further major expansion of the Roman Empire together with a shortening of its frontier line. They subdued several Germanic tribes, such as the Cherusci. In 6 AD, Tiberius declared Germania pacified, and Varus was appointed to govern it. Tiberius, who would later rule as emperor, left the region to suppress the Great Illyrian Revolt. Augustus made Publius Quinctilius Varus the first "officially appointed" governor of the newly created Roman province of Germania in 7 AD.

==== Battle of the Teutoburg Forest (AD 9) ====
In September of 9 AD, Varus was preparing to leave his summer headquarters in Vetera (modern day Xanten, Germany) and march three legions – the Seventeenth, Eighteenth, and Nineteenth – to Moguntiacum (modern day Mainz). News arrived from the Germanic prince Arminius, a Roman citizen and leader of an auxiliary cavalry unit, of a growing revolt in an area of the Rhine to the west. Ignoring a warning from Segestes not to trust Arminius, Varus followed Arminius' lead. Segestes and Arminius had publicly quarrelled, and so Varus had reasonable doubt regarding the accusations against Arminius.

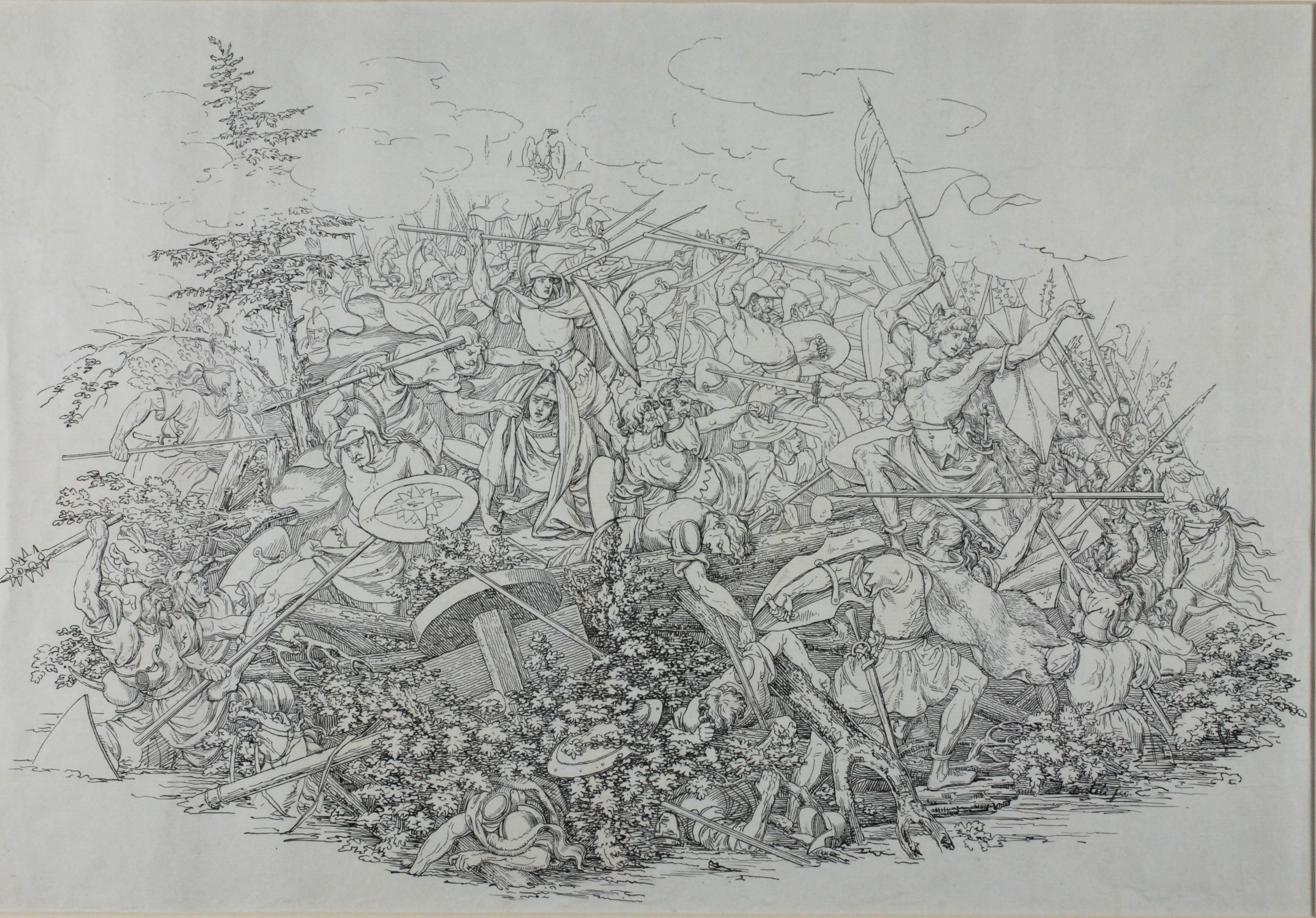
Lithograph by Swiss painter Martin Disteli depicting Varus falling on his sword during the Battle of the Teutoburg Forest, 1830s

Not only was Varus' trust in Arminius a terrible misjudgement, but Varus compounded it by placing his legions in a position where their fighting strengths would be minimized and those of the Germanic tribesmen maximized, as he expected no ambush and very little trouble in intimidating the rebels. Arminius and the Cherusci, along with other allies, had skillfully laid an ambush, and in the Battle of the Teutoburg Forest in September at Kalkriese (north of modern Osnabrück), the Romans marched right into it.

The heavily forested and swampy terrain made the infantry manoeuvres of the legions impossible to execute and allowed the Germanic coalition to defeat the legions in detail. On the third day of fighting, Germanic fighters overwhelmed the Roman troops at Kalkriese Hill, north of Osnabrück. Accounts of the defeat are scarce, due to the totality of the defeat, but the Roman historian Velleius Paterculus testifies that some Roman cavalrymen abandoned the infantry and fled towards the Rhine, but were intercepted by Germanic tribesmen and killed. Varus himself, upon seeing all hope was lost, took his own life by falling on his sword. Arminius cut off Varus' head and sent it to Bohemia as a present to Maroboduus of the Marcomanni, the other most important Germanic leader, whom Arminius hoped to coax into an anti-Roman military alliance, but Marboduus declined the offer and sent the head on to Rome for a proper burial.

Some captured Roman soldiers were caged and burned alive; others were enslaved or ransomed. The Roman historians Tacitus and Florus report that the victorious Germanic tribes tortured and sacrificed captive Roman officers to their gods on altars that could still be seen years later. The Roman army later recovered the lost legions' eagles, one each under Germanicus in 15 AD, 16 AD, and 42 AD.

==== Suicide and aftermath ====
Due to the shame and the ill luck thought to be created by the Roman defeat, the XVII, XVIII and XIX legions never again appeared in the Roman Army's order of battle. The loss at the Teutoburg Forest was keenly felt by Augustus in his remaining years. According to the biographer Suetonius, upon hearing the news, Augustus tore his clothes, refused to cut his hair for months and, for years afterwards, was heard, upon occasion, to yell, "Quinctilius Varus, give me back my legions!" (Quintili Vare, legiones redde!). Roman historians referred to the battle as the clades Variana ("Varian disaster").

Gibbon describes Augustus' reaction to the defeat as one of the few times the normally stoic ruler lost his composure. Varus' political legacy in Rome was destroyed and the government blamed him for the defeat. His son's (the younger Varus) chances for a political career were ruined. Tiberius himself fell under severe criticism for recommending Varus as the governor of Germania. Tiberius, according to Gaius Stern, was forced to sacrifice his friend and former brother-in-law to save his career. Furthermore, Varus himself had been one of the figures on the Ara Pacis, but the figure is lost today.

Stern has proposed that common citizens vandalized the Ara Pacis by damaging Varus in anger over their lost loved ones, leaving the regime, which had blamed Varus, uncertain as to whether or not to fix the damage. Approximately 40 years after Varus' death, a general under Claudius, Pomponius Secundus, raided Germania and by chance rescued a few POWs from Varus' army. Claudius welcomed them home after their long captivity, their stories arousing much pity.

== In popular culture ==
- I, Claudius (1934) by Robert Graves, a novelization of the reigns of the first four emperors. Varus does not actually appear in the novel, but his defeat by the Germans is an important event.
- The Iron Hand of Mars (1994) by Lindsey Davis; fourth book of the mystery series set during the reign of Vespasian, a portion of the novel occurs in the Teutoburger Wald.
- Give Me Back My Legions! (2009) by Harry Turtledove, which details the events leading up to the battle, including a great deal of background information on Varus himself.
- Undying Mercenaries (2014) by B. V. Larson, a series set in 2099, in which the main character fights with the Earth Mercenary Legion Varus. Much of the legion's culture and structure sources from Roman history and general Varus's life.
- Schlammschlacht (2015) by Heilung, track four on their first album Ofnir. The poem describes the Battle of the Teutoburg Forest from the Cherusci point of view.
- Varus is played by Gaetano Aronica in the 2020 Netflix series Barbarians.
- Teutoburg (Ambush of Varus) by Ex Deo, track seven on the album Caligvla, describes the Battle of the Teutoburg Forest from the Romans point of view, including various references towards Varus

== See also ==
- List of Roman governors of Africa
- List of Roman governors of Judaea
- List of Roman governors of Syria

Political offices
Preceded by Marcus Licinius Crassus Frugi; Gnaeus Cornelius Lentulus Augur	Roman consul 13 BC with Tiberius Claudius Nero	Succeeded by Marcus Valerius Messalla Appianus; Publius Sulpicius Quirinius
