= Publius Cornelius Dolabella =

Publius Cornelius Dolabella may refer to:

- Publius Cornelius Dolabella (consul 283 BC)
- Publius Cornelius Dolabella (consul 44 BC)
- Publius Cornelius Dolabella (consul 35 BC)
- Publius Cornelius Dolabella (consul 10)
- Publius Cornelius Dolabella (consul 55)

== See also ==
- Cornelii Dolabellae
