= Paullus Aemilius Lepidus =

1st century BC Roman senator and consul

- Spouses: Sempronia Atratina; Cornelia; Claudia Marcella Minor
- Children: Lucius Aemilius Paullus; Marcus Aemilius Lepidus; Aemilia Paulla; Paullus Aemilius Regulus

Paullus Aemilius Lepidus (c. 77 BC – after 11 BC) was a Roman senator.

== Biography ==
He was a grandson of Marcus Aemilius Lepidus and Appuleia through their son Lucius Aemilius Paullus and his wife. His paternal uncle Marcus Aemilius Lepidus served as a member of the Second Triumvirate. He was named an augur in 35 BCE. Paullus served as consul in 34 BC and censor in 22. Paullus was in some way related to a Cassia.

Paullus married Cornelia (c. 54 BC-16 BC). With Cornelia, Paullus had three children: Lucius Aemilius Paullus (c. 37 BC-14 AD) the husband of Julia the Younger and consul in AD 1; Marcus Aemilius Lepidus (c. 30 BC-33 AD), consul in AD 6; and a daughter Aemilia Paulla (c. 22 BC). Aemilia was married twice: first to Lucius Munatius Plancus, consul in AD 13; second to Publius Memmius Regulus.

Paullus was widowed in 18 BC, the same year Cornelia's brother Publius Cornelius Lentulus Marcellinus was consul. Not long after Cornelia's death, he married Claudia Marcella Minor, a daughter of Octavia the Younger, sister of the Roman emperor Augustus. The marriage of Marcella and Paullus linked two honored republican houses and tied them closely to the imperial circle. At some point after 11 BC, Marcella bore him a son, Paullus Aemilius Regulus, who later served as a quaestor during the rule of the Roman emperor Tiberius.

== Sources ==
- R. Syme, The Augustan Aristocracy, Oxford University Press, 1989
- M. Lightman & B. Lightman, A to Z of Ancient Greek and Roman Women, Infobase Publishing, 2008
- Article of Octavia Minor at Livius.org

Political offices
Preceded by L. Sempronius Atratinus; L. Scribonius Libo	Roman consul July–December 34 BC with Gaius Memmius; Marcus Herennius Picens	Succeeded by Octavian II; L. Volcatius Tullus as consules ordinari
