= Lucius Aemilius Paullus =

Lucius Aemilius Paullus may refer to:

- Lucius Aemilius Paullus (consul 219 BC), Roman consul who died at the Battle of Cannae (part of the Second Punic War) in 216 BC
- Lucius Aemilius Paullus Macedonicus (c. 229–160 BC), Roman consul who conquered ancient Macedonia
- Lucius Aemilius Paullus (consul 50 BC), Roman politician
- Lucius Aemilius Paullus (consul 1), Roman politician

== See also ==
- Aemilius Paullus (disambiguation)
