= Marcus Valerius Messalla Appianus =

Roman politician

Marcus Valerius Messalla Appianus (also known as Marcus Valerius Messalla Barbatus Appianus; c. 45 BC – 12 BC) was a Roman Senator during the reign of Augustus. He was ordinary consul in 12 BC with Publius Sulpicius Quirinius as his colleague.

== Family background ==
Not much is known about his family background and early life. Appianus may have been the son of Appius Claudius Pulcher, the consul of 38 BC. He was probably adopted by Marcus Valerius Messalla, suffect consul 32 BC, thus becoming Marcus Valerius Messalla Barbatus Appianus.

== Political career ==
According to the French historian Fr. François Catrou et Rouillé, Appianus served as a quaestor in the army of the Roman Triumvir Mark Antony. After this, little is known about his remaining political career beyond his consulship in 12 BC. He died not long afterwards.

== Marriage and issue ==
About 14 BC, Appianus married Claudia Marcella Minor, a daughter of Octavia the Younger; Claudia Marcella Minor's maternal uncle was the Roman emperor Augustus. Marcella bore Appianus two children: a daughter, Claudia Pulchra, and a son, Marcus Valerius Messalla Barbatus, although there has been some speculation that Claudia's father might actually have been Publius Claudius Pulcher, the son of Clodius.

== Sources ==
- R. Syme, The Augustan Aristocracy, Clarendon Press, 1986
- UGO FUSCO – GIAN LUCA GREGORI, A PROPOSITO DEI MATRIMONI DI MARCELLA MINORE E DEL MONVMENTVM DEI SUOI SCHIAVI E LIBERTI, aus: Zeitschrift für Papyrologie und Epigraphik 111 (1996) 226–232, Dr. Rudolf Habelt GmbH, Bonn
- M. Lightman & B. Lightman, A to Z of Ancient Greek and Roman Women, Infobase Publishing, 2008
- Jesuit François Catrou et Rouillé, Histoire romaine depuis la fondation de Rome [jusqu'a l'an 47 de J.-C.], avec des notes historiques, géographiques et critiques...par les RR. PP. Catrou et Rouillé de S. J. T. 01-20 (histoire romaine par Bernard Rothe, [sic pour Routh] T. 21)

Political offices
Preceded by Ti. Claudius Nero; P. Quinctilius Varus	Roman consul January–March 12 BC with P. Sulpicius Quirinius	Succeeded by Gaius Valgius Rufus as suffect consul
