= Lucius Scribonius Libo (consul 34 BC) =

Roman politician and soldier

Lucius Scribonius Libo was a Roman politician and military commander who was consul in 34 BC and brother-in-law to the future emperor Augustus. Libo rose to prominence through his connections with Pompey. When Julius Caesar rebelled against the Roman Senate in 49 BC, Libo sided with Pompey. He carried out a variety of military, diplomatic and naval roles, with mixed success.

After Pompey's death in 48 BC, Libo attached himself to Pompey's son, Sextus Pompey, Libo's son-in-law due to his marriage to Libo's daughter Scribonia. Libo was involved in a variety of negotiations with Octavian. In 35 BC Libo abandoned Sextus and was rewarded by being appointed consul in 34 BC.

== Early career and the Civil War ==
The Roman Republic, shown in dark green, in 40 BC

Libo's father of the same name was the praetor, or chief judicial officer, in 80 BC.

Libo was a member of the Scribonia family, which was plebeian, not a member of the ruling elite. He was closely connected to the family of Pompey, ties were strengthened in 55 BC after Pompey's son, Sextus Pompey, married Libo's daughter, Scribonia. It is assumed Libo reached the office of praetor by 50 BC.

In 50 BC the Senate, led by Pompey, ordered populist politician and general Julius Caesar to disband his army and return to Rome because his term as governor had ended. Caesar thought he would be prosecuted if he entered Rome without the immunity enjoyed by a magistrate. On 10 January 49 BC Caesar crossed the Rubicon river, and ignited Caesar's Civil War. He marched rapidly on Rome and captured it. Pompey and most of the Senate fled to Greece. Libo was appointed one of Pompey's legates, a high-ranking military position, and was given command of Etruria.

After Libo was driven from Etruria by Mark Antony, he took over command of the new recruits in Campania from Ampius Balbus. He then accompanied Pompey during his withdrawal to Brundisium, and there he acted as Pompey's intermediary with Gaius Caninius Rebilus, a close personal friend, who had been given the task by Julius Caesar of negotiating with Pompey. Rebilus advised Libo that if he could convince Pompey to reach an agreement with Caesar, Caesar would give credit to Libo for halting the civil war before it began in earnest. Although Libo reported Caesar's proposals, Pompey told Libo he could not agree to anything without the consuls being present.

Following Pompey to Macedonia, Libo was placed in charge of part of Pompey's fleet alongside Marcus Octavius, with instructions to prevent Caesar's forces crossing if possible. Off the Dalmatian coast they defeated a fleet under the command of Publius Cornelius Dolabella. They followed this up by defeating Gaius Antonius, who had attempted to assist Dolabella, and who was forced to flee to Corcyra Nigra. Short of supplies, he soon surrendered to Libo who took him and his troops to Pompey. By the time Caesar landed in Epirus and had taken Oricum, Pompey had sent Libo to join Marcus Calpurnius Bibulus, who was in charge of Pompey's fleet and was blockading Caesar at Oricum, but who was ill and unable to get fresh supplies. In order to break the stalemate, Bibulus and Libo sailed towards Oricum and requested a truce in order to negotiate with Caesar. Caesar agreed and Libo attempted to deceive Caesar into thinking that they were acting on Pompey's instructions. When Caesar was unable to make Libo agree to give safe conduct to Caesar's envoys, Caesar concluded that the negotiations were a sham designed to allow Bibulus to resupply his ships, and so refused to extend the truce and broke off negotiations.

With Bibulus's death in early 48 BC, Libo was given command of the Pompeian fleet, comprising some fifty galleys. He continued blockading Oricum, but came to the conclusion that, if he could close off Brundisium from the sea, he could cut Caesar off from reinforcements, and could redeploy the fleet elsewhere. Moving off to Brundisium, he caught the local commander, Mark Antony, unprepared. Libo burnt a number of storage ships, captured one full of grain, and landed troops on the island that commanded the entrance to the harbour, expelling a squad of Antony's troops in the process. Confident of success, he sent a letter to Pompey, advising him that he had secured the harbour and that the rest of the fleet should be repaired and rested. Antony, however, managed to trick Libo into pursuing some decoy ships, causing Libo's squadron to be attacked. Most of Libo's fleet managed to escape, but the troops he landed on the island were trapped and captured.

== Later career ==
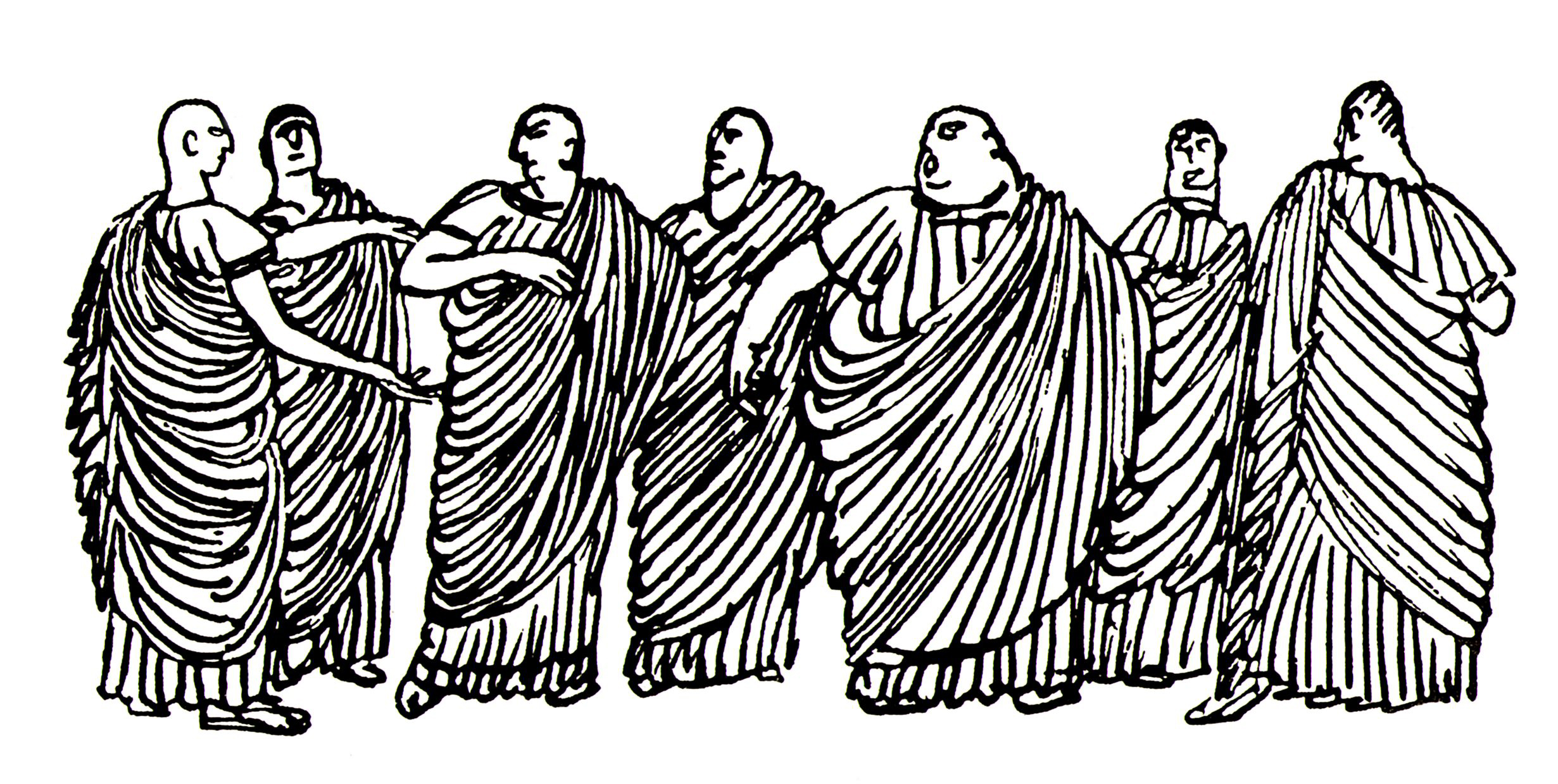
Roman senators

With the defeat and death of Pompey in 48 BC, Libo attached himself to Pompey's son, Sextus Pompey. Sextus was Libo's son-in-law due to his marriage to Libo's daughter Scribonia. In 40 BC, Sextus sent him as an unofficial envoy to Mark Antony in Greece, seeking an alliance against Octavian (later known as Augustus), who had just defeated Antony's partisans in the Perusine War, and was instrumental in forming an alliance between the two. Octavian attempted to drive a wedge between Sextus Pompey and Mark Antony by marrying Libo's sister, Scribonia. In the subsequent Pact of Misenum, Libo acted as an important negotiator; in return for his support, Sextus managed to extract from Octavian the promise of a future consulate for Libo.

After Octavian renewed the war against Sextus Pompey in 36 BC, Libo initially supported him. By 35 BC Libo felt his son-in-law's cause was lost; he abandoned Sextus and joined Mark Antony. As a reward, Antony ensured that Libo was elected consul in 34 BC alongside himself. He left office on 1 July, and was replaced by Gaius Memmius. By the time he became a consul he had been appointed as one of the seven Septemviri epulones, the religious body responsible for organising feasts and public banquets for festivals and games in Rome. It is believed that he died shortly after stepping down from his consulship.

== Family ==
Libo was the maternal uncle to consul Publius Cornelius Scipio, Cornelia Scipio and Julia the Elder. The name of his wife is not known, but she was a member of the gens Sulpicia, the family from which Roman emperor Galba would claim descent on his paternal side. Libo and wife had three children: two sons, Lucius Scribonius Libo, consul in 16; Marcus Scribonius Libo Drusus; and a daughter, Scribonia, who married Sextus Pompey.

== References and sources ==
=== Sources ===
- Military History Encyclopedia on the Web, Rickard, J (2010, December 21), Lucius Scribonius Libo, fl.56-34 BC
- RootsWeb.com, Finding Our Past, Family of Augustus and Scribonia LIBO
- Geneanet, Lucius Scribonius Libo,
- Kondratieff, Eric, Bd. 64, H. 4 (2015), pp. 428-466 (39 pages), Finding Libo: NUMISMATIC, EPIGRAPHIC AND TOPOGRAPHIC EVIDENCE FOR THE "CURSUS HONORUM" OF L. SCRIBONIUS L. F. LIBO, COS. 34 B.C.E.

Political offices
Preceded by Publius Cornelius Dollabella; Titus Peducaeus	Roman consul 34 BC with Mark Antony	Succeeded by Lucius Sempronius Atratinus; Gaius Memmius
Succeeded by
