= Cornelia (stepdaughter of Augustus) =

Roman noble woman

Cornelia was the daughter of Scribonia and her second husband. She was stepdaughter to Octavian (later the Emperor Augustus) through her mother's third marriage and half-sister to Julia the Elder, Augustus' only biological child.

== Life ==
Little is known of Cornelia, almost all of which comes from three primary sources. A passage from Suetonius says that before her marriage to Octavian, Scribonia was twice married to ex-consuls with children from only one of those marriages. An inscription attests to a slave owned by Scribonia and her son Cornelius Marcellinus. Finally, an elegy of Sextus Propertius takes the form of a message addressed to Paullus Aemilius Lepidus from his dead wife Cornelia. John Scheid has drawn from these three sources five definite facts about Cornelia:

1. Before marrying Octavian, Scribonia had two consular husbands and had children with the second;
2. Scribonia had a son named Cornelius Marcellinus;
3. Scribonia had a daughter named Cornelia;
4. Cornelia died in the year of her brother's consulate;
5. Cornelia was the wife of Paullus Aemilius Lepidus.

Scheid expands on the last point, noting that Cornelia must have died before her husband died in 13 BC, for Lepidus went on to marry Claudia Marcella; she in turn married Marcus Valerius Messalla Barbatus after the death of her husband.

One of Scribonia's husbands may have been Gnaeus Cornelius Lentulus Marcellinus, consul in 56 BC, based on the name of her son Cornelius Marcellinus. Since Propertius' poem alludes to Cornelia's descent from Scipio Aemilianus, scholars attempted to identify the other husband with a possible descendant of Scipio Aemilianus while explaining away Suetonius' statement that Scribonia had children by only one man. As a result, various other consular Publii Cornelii have been identified as her first husband, such as the suffect consul of 38 BC (who was later revealed to be Lucius Cornelius Lentulus), and the suffect consul of 35 BC (whom the Fasti Tauromenitani proved to be Publius Cornelius Dolabella). Thus none of the possible Cornelii could be her father. However, Ronald Syme traces Lentulus Marcellinus' ancestry to Scipio Aemilianus. In Scheid's estimation, Suetonius correctly stated that Scribonia only had children by one of her husbands, and that both Cornelia and Cornelius Marcellinus were children of Gnaeus Cornelius Lentulus Marcellinus. Scheid further argues that Cornelia's brother Cornelius Marcellinus was Publius Cornelius Lentulus Marcellinus, consul of 18 BC.

Syme, who argued that Cornelia's brother must be Publius Cornelius Scipio, suffect consul in 16 BC, also noted that the elegy about her follows another poem clearly dated to 16 BC, and that the rest of the poems in his collection are arranged in chronological order. But with the evidence of the Fasti Tauromenitani, it would be easier to accept that the poem about Cornelia is misplaced than to fit a hypothetical Cornelius Scipio into a consular list that is complete for these years.

Based on Scheid's arguments, Cornelia was probably born between 50 and 40 BC and had children around 30 BC. Since her brother Cornelius Marcellinus served consul for the entire year of 18 BC, she must have died in that year before her husband Lepidus. Her stepfather Augustus supposedly grieved her death as he found her a worthy elder sister to his daughter Julia.

== Family ==
Cornelia was married only once, to the Paullus Aemilius Lepidus mentioned above who was censor in 22 BC. Their children were:

- Lucius Aemilius Paullus (b. before 29 BC), consul in AD 1; married his first cousin Julia the Younger.
- Marcus Aemilius Lepidus (b. before 24 BC), consul in AD 6.
- Aemilia Paulli filia (b. 22 BC)

== See also ==
- Women in ancient Rome
- List of Roman women
