= Titus Peducaeus =

1st century BC Roman senator and consul

Titus Peducaeus (fl. 1st century BC) was a Roman senator who was appointed suffect consul in 35 BC.

== Biography ==
Peducaeus was a member of a late Republican senatorial family, but much of Peducaeus’ career is unclear. Confusion in the sources means that events in which a Peducaeus participated could be assigned to a number of individuals of the same gens. It is believed that Titus Peducaeus may possibly have been the Caesarean governor of Corsica et Sardinia in 48 BC; the primary source for this, Appian, gives him the praenomen "Sextus", but this has been questioned.

By 40 BC, he was possibly a legate under Lucius Antonius in Hispania. Then in 35 BC, he was appointed consul suffectus, replacing Lucius Cornificius. Nothing further is known of his career.

== Sources ==
- Broughton, T. Robert S., The Magistrates of the Roman Republic, Vol II (1952)
- Shackleton-Bailey, D. R., Cicero: Letters to Atticus: Volume 4, Books 7.10-10 (2004)

Political offices
Preceded by Lucius Cornificius	Suffect Consul of the Roman Empire; 35 BC with Publius Cornelius Dolabella	Succeeded by Marcus Antonius II; Lucius Scribonius Libo
