= Lucius Cornificius =

Lucius Cornificius, a member of the plebeian gens Cornificia, was a Roman politician and consul in 35 BC.

Cornificius served as the accuser of Marcus Junius Brutus in the court which tried the murderers of Julius Caesar. In 38 BC Octavian gave him the command of a fleet in the war against Sextus Pompeius during which he distinguished himself in battle in the waters around Sicily. In 36 BC he was given part of the army and managed to extricate his troops from a dangerous situation and unite them with Marcus Vipsanius Agrippa at Mylae. For these services he was rewarded with the consulship in 35 BC.

It is said of Cornificius that he afterwards accustomed himself in Rome to ride home upon an elephant whenever he supped out. As part of the embellishing program that Augustus started, Cornificius rebuilt a temple of Diana.

To him is sometimes erroneously attributed the Rhetorica ad Herennium.

== Primary sources ==
- Plutarch Brut. 27
- Appian, B. C. v. 80, 86, 111—115
- Dion Cassius xlix. 5—7; Velleius Paterculus ii. 79; Dion Cassius xlix. 18;
- Suet. Aug. 29.

Political offices
Preceded by Lucius Nonius Asprenas, and Quintus Marcius as suffect consuls	Suffect consul of the Roman Empire; 35 BC with Sextus Pompeius	Succeeded by Publius Cornelius Dolabella, and Titus Peducaeus as suffect consuls
