= Paullus Aemilius Regillus =

Roman senator

Paullus Aemilius Regillus or Regulus (born around 15/14 BC) was a Roman Senator and grandnephew of the emperor Augustus.

== Biography ==
=== Early life ===
He was the son of the consul and censor Paullus Aemilius Lepidus and Claudia Marcella the Younger, who was a daughter of Octavia the Younger and thus a niece of the Roman emperor Augustus. From his father's previous marriage, Regillus had two half-brothers and one half-sister. He was born c. 15 BC/14 BC. His father died shortly after his birth, and his mother subsequently remarried. Regillus was born and raised in Rome. Through his half-brother Marcus Valerius Messalla Barbatus, he was the uncle of the Roman Empress Valeria Messallina.

=== Career ===
Regillus' political career was contemporaneous with the rule of the Roman emperors Augustus and Tiberius, during which he served as a quaestor. During the reign of Tiberius (14 to 37), Regillus was one of the emperor's comites, an imperial legate and proconsul of a Roman province. According to inscriptional evidence, Regillus was patron of Saguntum.

== Sources ==
- R. Szramkiewicz (1975). Les gouverneurs de province à l'époque augustéenne. Nouvelles éditions latines.
- Ugo Fusco and Gian Luca Gregori (1996). "A proposito dei matrimoni di Marcella minore e del monvmentvm dei suoi schiavi e liberti" (PDF). Zeitschrift für Papyrologie und Epigraphik. 111. Bonn: Dr. Rudolf Habelt GmbH: 226–232.
- R. Syme (1989). The Augustan Aristocracy. Oxford University Press.
- M. Lightman and B. Lightman (2008). A to Z of Ancient Greek and Roman Women. Infobase Publishing.
- Jona Lendering (2014). "Octavia Minor". Livius.org. Archived from the original on 2013-09-28.
