= Suicide in antiquity =

Suicide was a widespread occurrence in antiquity across cultures. There were many different methods and reasons for committing suicide, and these vary across place and time. The origins of modern moral debates over the ethics of suicide can be found in this era.

== Justifiable reasons for suicide in Antiquity ==
=== Attitudes in pre-Christian Greek and Roman culture ===
In some ancient societies, suicide may have been considered an act of personal redemption. The Roman historian Livy describes the apocryphal suicide of Lucretia as an atonement for being sexually assaulted, thus losing her chastity; before dying by suicide Lucretia says, "although I acquit myself of the sin, I do not free myself from the penalty." Lucretia's death is an example of suicide being a socially acceptable and honourable way to deal with shame in Roman society. Writing on Ancient Greece, Elise Garrison said that many ancient victims of suicide "[were] determined to regain lost honor and restore equilibrium to society".

Old age and terminal or chronic illness could also be motivating factors for suicide.

Garrison also refers to the works of Émile Durkheim. She says that Durkheim talks about people belonging to different types and categories. Determining what category they are in could decide the reason they would die by suicide. "Durkheim's categories [are]—egoistic, altruistic, anomic, fatalistic".

Durkheim explains that egoistic people overthink and reflect on everything. They tend to have high knowledge and do not integrate into society well. Protestants, for example, may default to an egoistic category, according to Durkheim. The altruistic person devalues themselves, instead preferencing the opinion of the group. Those who lead a strict lifestyle or are religiously strict regarding obedience (such as Catholicism and Judaism) may default to an altruistic category, according to Durkheim. Self-sacrifice is considered part of altruistic suicide. Anomic suicide can result from someone who does not control or limit their desires. They satisfy every desire without regulation. Fatalistic suicide will commonly occur in someone who is highly regulated and does not satisfy enough of their desires. These categories apply to suicide today, similar to how they applied in antiquity.

=== Suicide in cultural practices of ancient India ===
In ancient India, there were two forms of altruistic suicide practiced. Jauhar was a mass suicide by women of a community because their menfolk suffered defeat in battle, and the women feared retribution, rape, enslavement, or worse by the enemy soldiers. Sati was the self-immolation of a widow on the funeral pyre of her husband, or her suicide following, the pretexts varying, whether for emotional, religious, or anticipated economic destitution (especially if elderly) or out of compulsion of the family to more expeditiously redistribute the widow's property.

== Suicide in Ancient Greece ==
Suicide was discussed in all of the philosophical schools of the Greco-Roman world as a controversial issue. J.M. Rist says, "From the earliest days of the Stoic school the problem of suicide is...a problem of free will". Each school formed its own opinion on the consequences and moral meanings of suicide, and many Greeks came to consider suicide a heroic act. A.D. Nock said, "there was a certain fascination about self-chosen death".

=== Philosophers in Ancient Greece ===
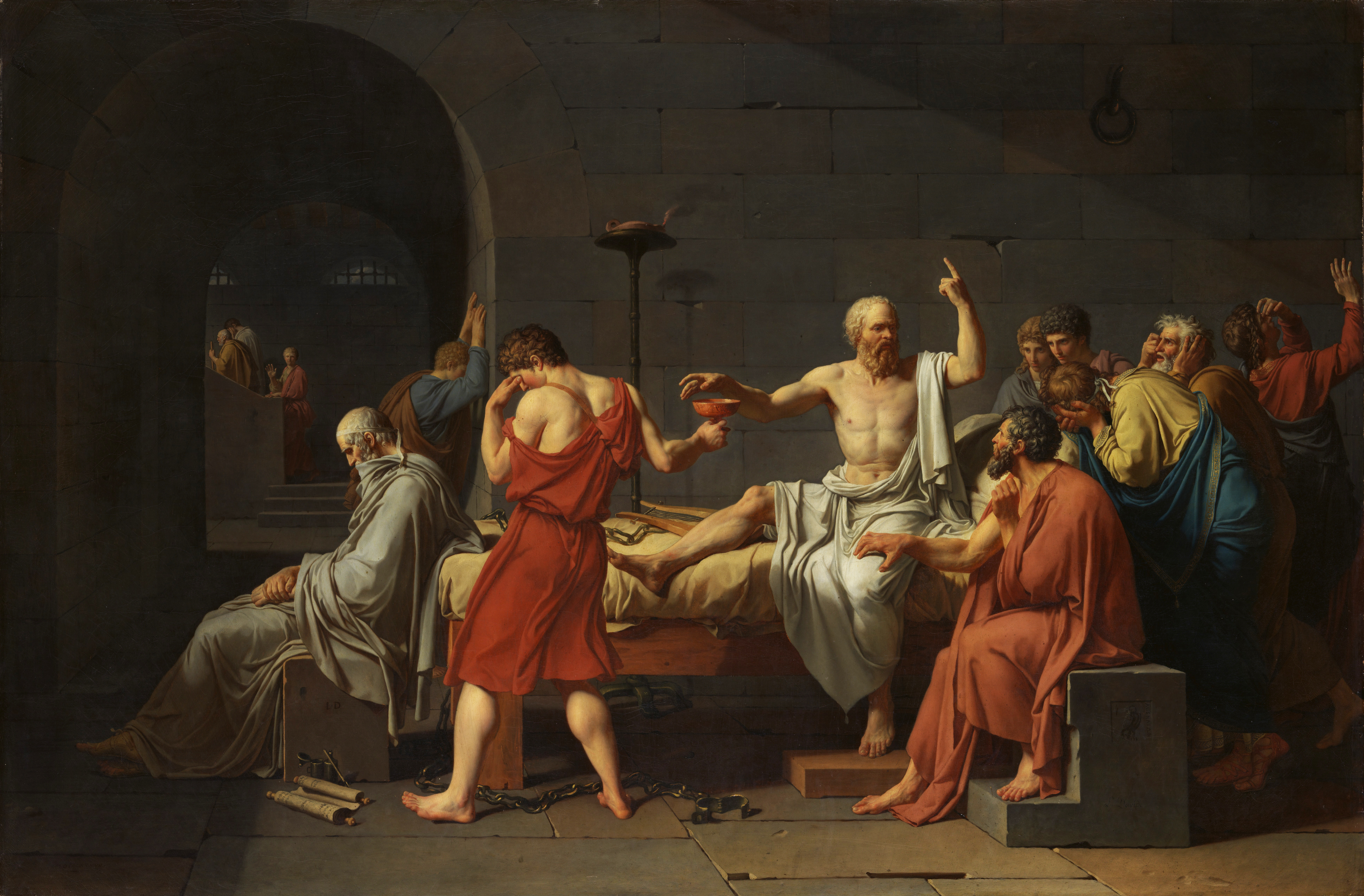
Jacques-Louis David, The Death of Socrates, 1787

Socrates concluded that "a man, who is one of the god's possessions, should not kill himself ‘until the god sends some compulsion upon him, as he sends compulsion on us at present'". He thus saw one who died by suicide as condemnable, even though he did so himself. The defense of his eventual suicide is detailed in Plato's written account in the Apology. Though he was sentenced to death by the state, Socrates had the chance to refuse and escape, instead of choosing to drink hemlock.

Plato also had views on the subject of suicide. We learn from J.M. Rist that, "in the Phaedo Plato allows a very small loophole in his condemnation of the frequent Greek practice of suicide... "What ought a man to suffer," asks Plato, "if he kills that which is most truly his own... that is, if he takes his own life?" Plato believed that the state and the gods were associated, "Hence crimes against the state are crimes against the gods and vice versa. When a man kills himself without good reason... he is committing a crime". This allowed the state the right to punish. However, this did not imply that suicide was completely unacceptable. Plato believed that suicide was acceptable under some circumstances, similar to Socrates.

Aristotle also believed that suicide was acceptable in some circumstances. Although he believed that, "taking one's own life to avoid poverty or desire or pain is unmanly... or rather cowardly," he also felt that it was allowed if the state ordered it. The case of Socrates offered an illustration of this statement.

=== Stoic approaches ===
Stoicism encompassed the belief of most Greeks when it came to suicide. The Stoics believed that suicide was wrong except under certain circumstances. Zeno believed that "god gives the sign for an individual's departure". As god's sign is indicative that the work or duty of that person has been achieved, it is only in this circumstance, that it is morally acceptable to end one's life.

== Biblical accounts ==
The Christian Bible and the Old and New Testaments have five accounts of suicide recorded.

=== Examples in the Old Testament ===
An account of suicide in the Old Testament is that of Samson. Samson had been blessed by the lord with great strength but had lost this blessing. He was then imprisoned by the Philistines. When Samson was brought before the Philistines to entertain them, he leaned against the support pillar of the temple they were inside and prayed to God for strength. After God answered his prayer, with his newfound strength, Samson knocked down the pillar, causing the temple to crumble on himself and 3,000 Philistines.

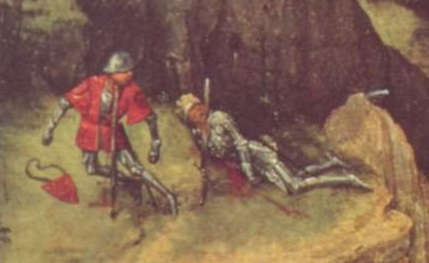
Pieter Bruegel the Elder, The Death of Saul (detail), 1562

Another story in the Old Testament regarding suicide is of King Saul and his armor-bearer. After being fatally injured by some Philistines, King Saul asked his armor bearer to kill him. But when his armor-bearer refused, the King took the sword and fell on it. Then, his aide, being so distraught at the death of his king, also took the sword and killed himself (1 Sam. 31:4-5). In this context, King Saul is committing suicide because he believes he will die and end his pain sooner. Alternatively, his servant kills himself out of devotion and respect for his king.

The third account of suicide is that of a servant of King David's son, Absalom. The servant, named Ahithophel, hanged himself as Absalom did not take his advice.

The fourth account is of Zimri. He was treasonous and proclaimed himself king after murdering King Elah. When the army would not follow him, he locked himself in his quarters and set them on fire.

=== Examples in the New Testament ===
The most commonly known and recorded suicide in the Bible is the story of Judas after he betrays Jesus. "He cast down the pieces of silver in the temple, departed, and went and hanged himself" (Matt 27:6). Augustine of Hippo said of this incident, "He did not deserve mercy; and that is why no light shone in his heart to make him hurry for pardon from the one he had betrayed, as those who crucified him were to do. In that despair, he killed himself."

=== Bible teachings ===
Some assert that the Biblical accounts of suicide do not have enough additional commentary within Scripture itself to understand what teachings would come from them. Due to the lack of details, many assume that in ancient Israel, suicide may have been considered natural or even heroic.

In Acts 16:27–28, the apostle Paul saves a jailer from committing suicide. This rare rescue is portrayed favorably.

Scholars debate the doctrines in the Bible concerning suicide. The traditional teachings handed down by the Catholic Church as a supplement, however, are clear. Augustine taught that "there is no legitimate reason for committing suicide, not even to avoid sinning.... When Judas hanged himself, he increased rather than expiated the crime of that accursed betrayal". Augustine's claim, however, does not specifically state the doctrine relating to suicide either in the Old Testament or the New.

== See also ==
- List of suicides (BC)
