= Sextus Pompeius (relatives of triumvir Pompey) =

Paternal uncle of triumvir Pompey and key descendants of Pompey's uncle

== Brother to Pompeius Strabo ==
Sextus Pompeius Virdoctus (fl. late 2nd and early 1st centuries BC) was a Roman born into an equestrian family in Picenum (in the south and the north of the modern regions of Marche and Abruzzo respectively) in central Italy, on the Adriatic coast. His cognomen Virdoctus, suggests he was a first-born child and son.

Sextus’ mother was called Lucilia. Lucilia's family originated from Suessa Aurunca (modern Sessa Aurunca) and she was a sister of the satirical poet Gaius Lucilius. Lucilius was a friend of Roman general Scipio Aemilianus. Sextus’ paternal grandfather was Gnaeus Pompeius, while his father was Sextus Pompeius. His younger brother was the consul Gnaeus Pompeius Strabo and his sister was Pompeia. Through his brother, he was the paternal uncle to triumvir Pompey (Gnaeus Pompeius Magnus) and his sister Pompeia.

Sextus never obtained any high office of state, although he gained a great reputation as a learned man. The historian and senator Cicero, praised Sextus in his writings for his accurate knowledge of geometry, Stoicism and jurisprudence. The only time that his name is recorded in Roman public affairs was when, on one occasion, Sextus was present with his younger brother in his military camp during the Social War.

Sextus married an unnamed Roman woman and had two sons: a younger Sextus Pompeius and Quintus Pompeius. His second son Quintus Pompeius, is only known through the letters of Cicero. In one of his letters, Cicero had recommended Quintus in an undated letter which was addressed to Curius, who was a Roman proconsul of an unknown Roman province.

== Cousin to triumvir Pompey ==
Sextus Pompeius was a Roman who lived in the 1st century BC and was a son of Sextus Pompeius. He was a cousin to triumvir Pompey and his sister Pompeia. Very little is known on him.

== Consul of 35 BC ==
Sextus Pompeius was a Roman who lived in the 1st century BC and was the grandson of Sextus Pompeius. His mother is an unnamed Roman woman. He was consul in 35 BC as the colleague of Lucius Cornificius. This was the same year his paternal second cousin Sextus Pompeius was killed in Asia.

Gaius Stern has hypothesized that this Sextus Pompeius was plucked from obscurity to hold the consulship of 35 BC to fulfil the pledge made by the Second Triumvirate to Sextus Pompeius, the son of Pompey the Great, that he would be consul in the near future. Since the future Augustus had pledged that Sextus would be consul, he fulfilled this pledge with a different Sextus Pompey. The son of Pompey the Great was defeated at the battles of Mylae and Naulochus in 36 BC and fled to the Greek East.

== Consul of AD 14 ==
Sextus Pompeius was a Roman senator who lived during the 1st century BC and into the 1st century AD. He appears to be the last known direct descendant of the original Sextus Pompeius. He appeared to have a witty character and to be very intelligent. Sextus was a patron of literature and the Roman poet Ovid addressed to him four poems when he was living in exile. These poems were collected in the fourth book of Epistulae ex Ponto.

His relationship to the previous Sextus Pompeius is problematic. Some authors infer he was the son of the consul of 35 BC. However, Ronald Syme notes "an intermediate generation should be allowed for, as happens in the stemmata of other noble families." Based on Cassius Dio's assertion that this Sextus Pompeius had a connection to the imperial family, Syme catalogues some possible individuals who could have been his mother. Some authorities follow Bartolomeo Borghesi and assert she was the daughter of Lucius Marcius Philippus suffect consul in 38 BC. Syme suggests she might be the daughter of Sextus Appuleius, consul in 29 BC or the daughter of that consul's brother, Marcus Appuleius consul in 20 BC.

Sextus served as consul in AD 14 with Sextus Appuleius. The two men held office when the first Roman Emperor, Augustus, died, and they were the first to swear allegiance to the new Emperor, Tiberius, Augustus’ adopted son and successor. At the funeral of Augustus, Sextus broke his leg.

In Tiberius’ reign, he was one of seven witnesses of the Senatus consultum de Cn. Pisone patre, the Roman Senate's official act concerning the trial and punishment of Gnaeus Calpurnius Piso; the act was published on 10 December AD 20. Later, Sextus served as proconsul of Asia from 24 to 26.

Seneca the Younger alludes to the wealth of a Pompeius, whose domains included the sources and mouths of rivers, then contrasts this with Caligula taking him into his palace and starving Pompeius to death, then arranging a public funeral for his victim. Although experts often identify Seneca's reference to a Pompeius with this Sextus Pompeius, Syme points out this would lead to "interesting (or rather intolerable) consequences for the chronology of Valerius Maximus", and argues the Pompeius Caligula was so inhospitable to was an otherwise unattested son.

== Sources ==
- Tacitus - Annals
- https://web.archive.org/web/20080503112904/http://www.ancientlibrary.com/smith-bio/1930.html
- Article title
- Westphal, Heiko. (2023). Sextus Pompeius (Consul of 14 CE). https://doi.org/10.1002/9781444338386.wbeah55196
