= Quintilia (actress) =

Quintilia (1st century) was an Ancient Roman stage performer - a pantomime dancer and actress.

She was a famed beauty during the reign of Caligula. She was the lover of the senator Pompedius. A rival of Pompedius, senator Timidius, reported Pompedius to Caligula and claimed that Quintilia had knowledge of a plot against Caligula. Caligula had Quintilia arrested and severely tortured (according to Josephus, the man who tortured her was actually Cassius Chaerea, who eventually plotted Caligula's assassination). She revealed nothing, and was finally released and financially compensated by Caligula. Her loyalty toward Pompedius was praised as a role model by Josephus and Suetonius in a rare instance when a stage performer, a profession with a very low status at that time, was praised as a role model.
