= Battle of Lake Constance =

Battle in 15 BC

Coordinates: 47.593710°N 9.424906°E

- Part of the Roman conquest of Rhetia and the Alps
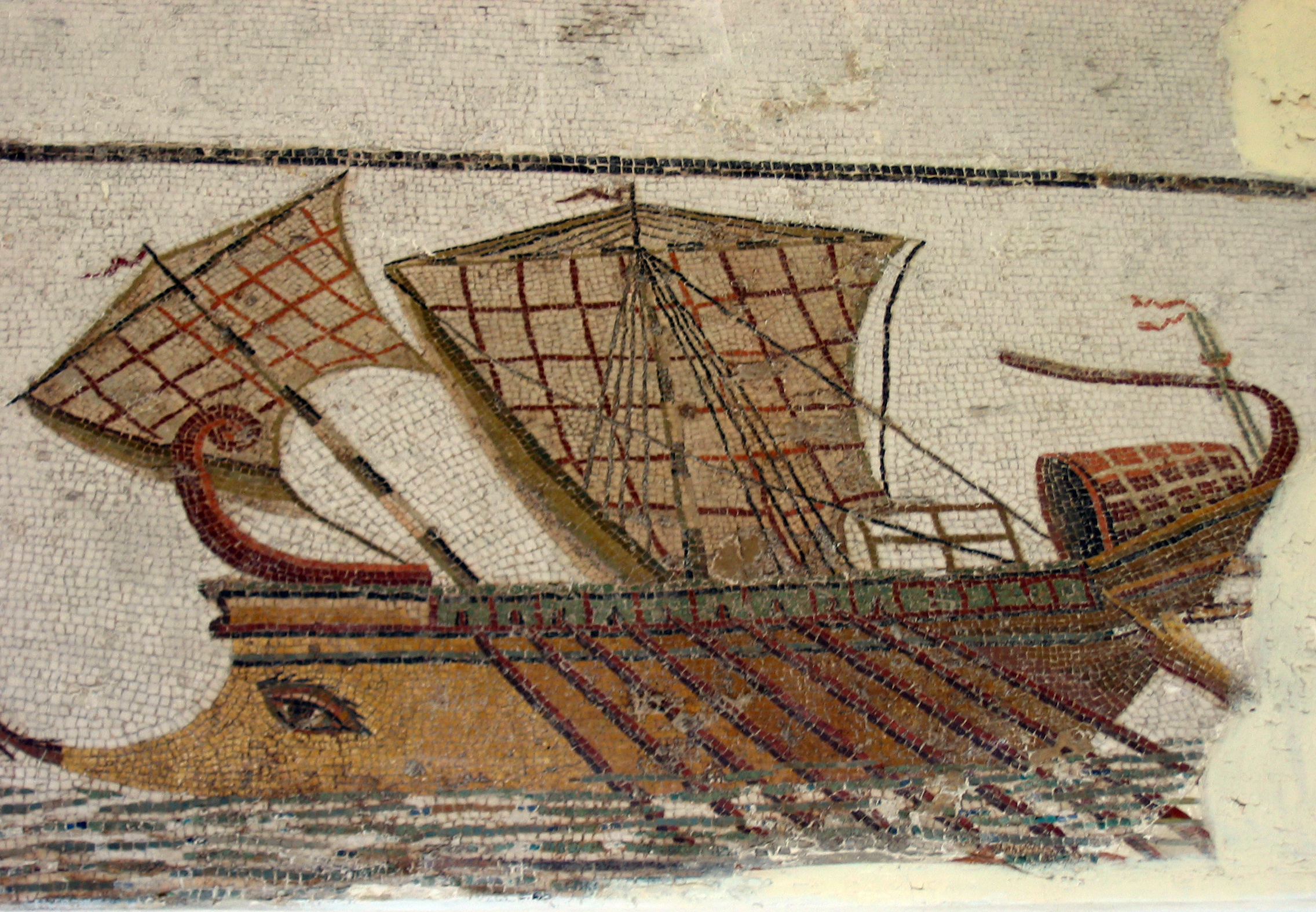
- Roman trireme
Date	15 BC
Location	Lake Constance
Result	Roman victory

Belligerents
Roman Empire	Celtic tribes

Commanders and leaders
Tiberius	

Units involved
10,000 legionaries	

The Battle of Lake Constance (Latin: Lacus Brigantinus) was a small naval battle between Roman forces and Celtic tribes on Lake Constance in the spring of 15 BC.

== Background ==
The battle occurred during the Roman campaigns under Augustus to conquer the northern Alps and regions south of the Danube river. During the last phase of the campaigns in the spring of 15 BC two Roman armies under Drusus and Tiberius set out to subdue Raetia. Drusus' army started from northern Italy crossing the Alps and moving towards the present-day city of Augsburg. Tiberius assembled his army of probably 10,000 legionaries and a similar number of auxiliar troops in the southwest of Germany (Roman army camp in Dangstetten). Then he moved eastwards ultimately heading towards Augsburg as well.

When Tiberius reached Lake Constance, he ordered the construction of a small fleet of transport vessels, allowing him to cross and control the lake. According to Strabon, the Vindelici, a group of Celtic tribes native to the area, attacked the Roman vessels on the lake in a naval engagement but were defeated. Cassius Dio only tells of the construction of transport ships and does not mention any naval engagement.
