= Marcus Valerius Messalla Barbatus (consul 20) =

Marcus Valerius Messalla Barbatus (sometimes called Messalinus; fl. 13 – died 21 AD) was a Roman politician in the 1st century. He was the father of empress Messalina.

== Family ==
Barbatus was a member of the illustrious patrician gens Valeria. His father was either Marcus Valerius Messalla Messalinus, consul of 3 BC, or Marcus Valerius Messalla Appianus, consul of 12 BC. His mother was Claudia Marcella Minor, niece of the emperor Augustus. His possible son or cousin, Marcus Valerius Messalla Corvinus, served as consul in 58 AD. He married Domitia Lepida and was the father of the empress Messalina.

== Biography ==
Barbatus joined the Arval Brethren in 13 AD, serving until his death in 21 AD. In 20 AD, he was elected consul together with his relative Marcus Aurelius Cotta Maximus Messalinus as his colleague. The consuls accompanied Agrippina during the funeral procession of Germanicus to Rome.
