= Publius Cornelius Dolabella (consul 35 BC) =

Roman suffect consul in 35 BC

Publius Cornelius Dolabella (fl. 1st century BC) was a Roman senator who was appointed suffect consul in 35 BC with Titus Peducaeus as his colleague.

== Biography ==
=== Early life ===
A member of the patrician Dolabella branch of the gens Cornelia, Dolabella was probably the descendant of Gnaeus Cornelius Dolabella, who was Urban praetor in 81 BC. His father may have been Publius Cornelius Dolabella the consul of 44 BC.

He may have been the man who informed Cleopatra of Octavian's plans when he had captured her.

=== Career ===
Much of his career is unknown; based on a series of rare and enigmatic bronze coins, it has been postulated that he may have been a triumvir monetalis in Sicily at some early point in his career. Appointed consul suffectus in 35 BC to replace Sextus Pompeius, it is not known whether he was a partisan of Gaius Julius Caesar Octavianus or Marcus Antonius. He also perhaps may have been the Dolabella who accompanied Augustus to Gaul between 16 – 13 BC.

== Personal life ==
It is speculated that Dolabella married a Quinctilia, a sister of Publius Quinctilius Varus, and that their son was Publius Cornelius Dolabella, who was Roman consul in AD 10.

== Sources ==
- Tansey, Patrick, "The Perils of Prosopography: The Case of the Cornelii Dolabellae", Zeitschrift für Papyrologie und Epigraphik, 130 (2000), pp. 265–271

Political offices
Preceded by Lucius Cornificius, and Sextus Pompeius as ordinary consuls	Suffect Consul of the Roman Republic; 35 BC with Titus Peducaeus	Succeeded by Marcus Antonius II, and Lucius Scribonius Libo as ordinary consuls
