= Claudia Pulchra =

Roman woman and patrician (14 BC – AD 26)

- Born: 14 BC
- Died: AD 26 (aged 39-40)
- Spouse: Publius Quinctilius Varus
- Children: Publius Quinctilius Varus the Younger
- Parents: Marcus Valerius Messalla Appianus (father); Claudia Marcella Minor (mother)

Claudia Pulchra (14 BC – AD 26) (PIR^{2} C 1116) was a Patrician woman of Ancient Rome who lived during the reigns of the Roman emperors Augustus and Tiberius.

== Biography ==
=== Early life ===
She was a daughter of Claudia Marcella Minor and the Roman consul of 12 BC, Marcus Valerius Messalla Appianus. Her maternal grandmother was Octavia the Younger, sister of Augustus. There has been some speculation among historians such as George Patrick Goold that her father might actually have been Publius Claudius Pulcher (the son of Clodius) but others such as Ronald Syme have rejected this proposal.

=== Marriage ===
She became the third wife of the Roman general and politician Publius Quinctilius Varus. Pulchra bore Varus a son, also named Publius Quinctilius Varus. Her husband committed suicide in September AD 9 during the Battle of the Teutoburg Forest, Germania Inferior and she never remarried.

=== Later life ===
Pulchra was always a close friend to her second cousin Agrippina the Elder. Through her friendship with Agrippina, Pulchra became the victim of the intrigues associated with the treason trial of Sejanus in AD 26. Gnaeus Domitius Afer accused her of an attempt to poison Tiberius, casting magic and immorality. She died in exile. The Roman historian Tacitus considered the trial to be an indirect political attack against Agrippina.

Her son became wealthy through the inheritance of both his parents. In 27, the younger Varus found himself facing accusations of treason and was nearly condemned. His trial has been attributed to the increasing distrust of Tiberius and the machinations of Sejanus.

== See also ==
- Women in ancient Rome

== Bibliography ==
- J. R. Abdale, Four days in September: The Battle of Teutoburg (Google eBook), Trafford Publishing, 2013
- M. Lightman & B. Lightman, A to Z of Ancient Greek and Roman Women, Infobase Publishing, 2008
- A. Barrett, Agrippina: Sex, Power, and Politics in the Early Empire, Yale University Press, 1998
