= Claudia Marcella Minor =

Paternal grandmother of empress Messalina

- Spouse: Publius Claudius Pulcher (possibly); Marcus Valerius Messalla Appianus; Paullus Aemilius Lepidus; Marcus Valerius Messalla Messallinus (possibly)
- Issue: Claudia Pulchra; Marcus Valerius Messalla Barbatus; Paullus Aemilius Regillus; Valeria Messallia (possibly)
- House: Julio-Claudian dynasty
- Father: Gaius Claudius Marcellus
- Mother: Octavia the Younger

Claudia Marcella Minor (Note: Also known by the names Marcella Minor, Claudia Marcella the Younger and Marcella the Younger.) (PIR^{2} C 1103, born some time before 39 BC) was a niece of the first Roman emperor Augustus. She was the second surviving daughter of the emperor's sister Octavia the Younger and her first husband Gaius Claudius Marcellus. Marcella had many children by several husbands, and through her son Marcus Valerius Messalla Barbatus she became the grandmother of the empress Messalina.

== Biography ==
=== Early life ===
Octavia was pregnant when she married Mark Antony in 40, and it is likely that the child was Marcella Minor - but this is not a certainty. If so, Marcella was born after the death of her father and she grew up part of the first post-Actium generation. Her full siblings were older sister Claudia Marcella Major and her only surviving brother Marcus Claudius Marcellus. From her mother's second marriage to Mark Antony she would also gain two half sisters, Antonia Major and Antonia Minor.

=== Marriages ===
Marcella's first known marriage was to the former consul and censor Paullus Aemilius Lepidus, around 15 BC, when she was about 24. Paullus was previously widowed, and had three children from his earlier marriage; Marcella may also have been previously married. Marcella bore him a son called Paullus Aemilius Regillus. Eva Bayer-Niemeier proposed that the Lucius Aemilius Paullus who died in 14 may have been another son of Lepidus and Marcella, but J. Scheid and Ronald Syme thinks that this man was identical with the Lucius Aemilius Paullus who was consul in 1 AD, but this identification is not universally agreed upon. After the death of Lepidus, Marcella married Marcus Valerius Messalla Appianus, by whom she had a son, Marcus Valerius Messalla Barbatus, and likely a daughter, Claudia Pulchra.

There has been some speculation among historians such as George Patrick Goold that her daughter Claudia Pulchra might have actually been the child of Publius Claudius Pulcher (the son of Clodius) from an earlier marriage, but others such as Syme have rejected this proposal. Syme does on the other hand agree that Paullus (nor Appianus) likely wasn't Marcella's first husband, as the marriage is recorded rather late, he instead proposed a marriage to a son of Lucius Marcius Philippus (Note: Lucius Marcius Philippus was married to Atia, the aunt of Marcella's mother Octavia. Philippus was also Octavia's step-brother.) who may have died or been repudiated before he was old enough to be consul or to Marcus Appuleius, Marcella's maternal half-cousin who is assumed to have died some time after his consulship in 20 BC. Klaus Zmeskal believes that it was she and not her sister who was married to Iullus Antonius.

In the next generation two Vipstani are known, with the cognomina "Messalla" and "Poplicola". This led Syme to observe that either Lucius or Marcus Vipstanus Gallus married a daughter of Marcus Valerius Messalla Messallinus and Claudia Marcella Minor, who is named (for convenience) Valeria Messallia. French historian Christian Settipani endorsed this view. However, Messallinus (son of Corvinus) was younger than Marcella. That fact does not prevent the marriage, but makes it unlikely, given Roman tradition. This alliance with the gens Valeria led to the prominence of the Vipstani during the first centuries of the Roman Empire.

== Legacy ==
In a tomb near Rome, numerous inscriptions have survived of slaves and freedmen of Marcella. A columbarium located between the Via Appia and Via Latina in Rome belonged to the family of Marcella. According to epigraphical evidence, the work on it was completed in 10, when the urns were divided among the shareholders of the company which had built the place.

== See also ==
- Women in ancient Rome
