= Octavia the Younger =

Roman noblewoman, full-sister of Augustus

Octavia Minor
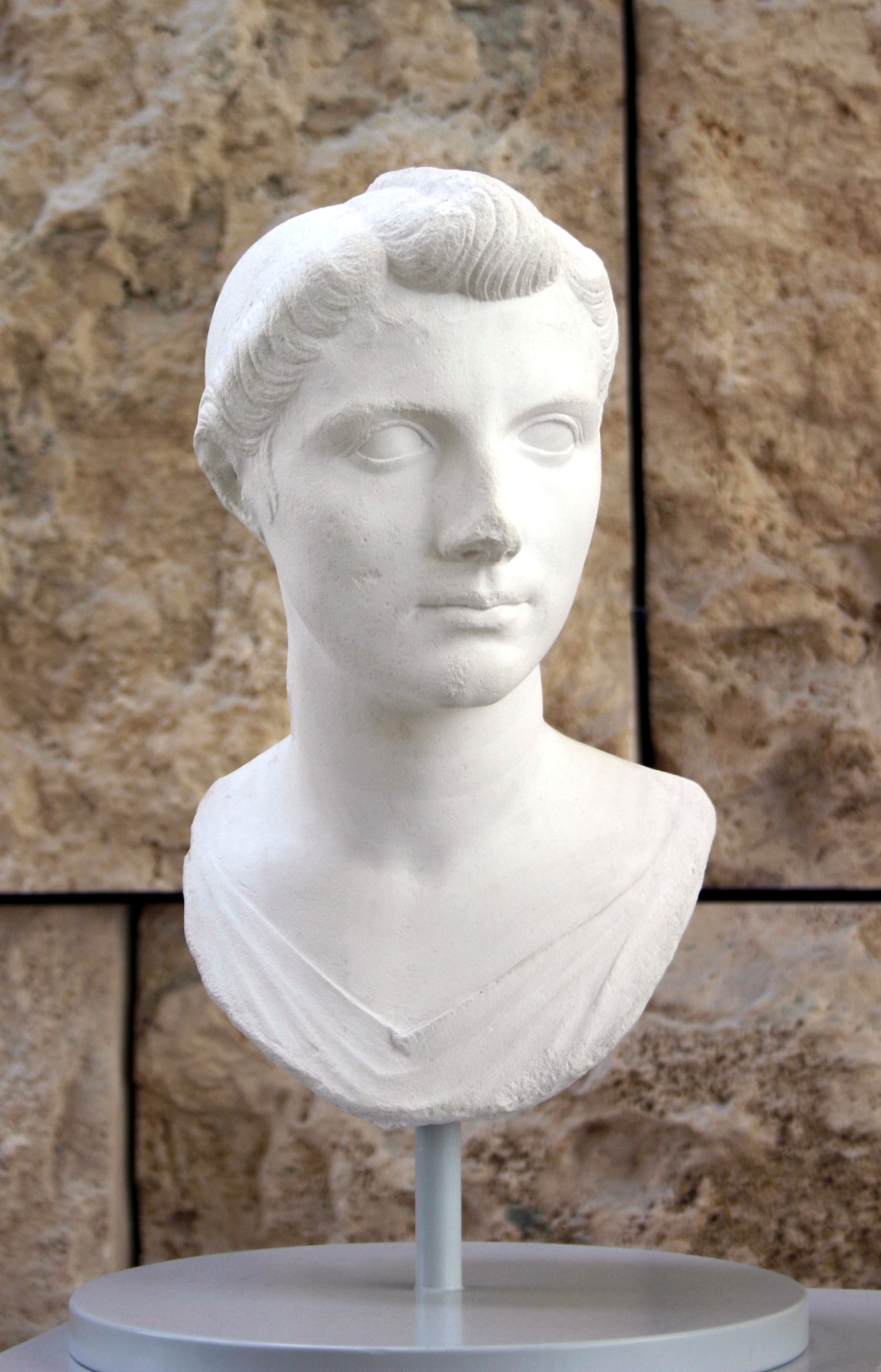
- Born: c. 69 BC; Nola, Italy, Roman Republic
- Died: 11 BC (aged c. 58); Rome, Italy, Roman Empire
- Burial: Mausoleum of Augustus
- Spouse: Gaius Claudius Marcellus; Mark Antony
- Issue: Claudia Marcella Major; Claudia Marcella Minor; Marcus Claudius Marcellus; Antonia the Elder; Antonia Minor
- Dynasty: Julio-Claudian
- Father: Gaius Octavius
- Mother: Atia

Octavia the Younger (Latin: Octavia Minor ; c. 69 BC – 11 BC) was the elder sister of the first Roman emperor (Augustus, also known as Octavian), the half-sister of Octavia the Elder, and the fourth wife of Mark Antony. She was also the great-grandmother of the Emperor Caligula and Empress Agrippina the Younger (who was empress during the reign of Claudius), maternal grandmother of Claudius and his brother Germanicus, and paternal great-grandmother and maternal great-great-grandmother of the Emperor Nero.

== Life ==
=== Childhood ===
Octavia was born around 69 BC. Full sister to Augustus, Octavia was the only daughter born of Gaius Octavius' second marriage to Atia, niece of Julius Caesar. Octavia was born in Nola, present-day Italy; her father, a Roman governor and senator, died in 59 BC from natural causes. Her mother later remarried, to the consul Lucius Marcius Philippus. Octavia spent much of her childhood travelling with her parents. Marcius was in charge of educating Octavia and her brother Octavian, later known as Augustus.

=== First marriage ===
Some time before 54 BC, her stepfather arranged for her to marry Gaius Claudius Marcellus. He was a member of the influential plebeian branch of the Claudian family and descended from Marcus Claudius Marcellus, a famous general in the Second Punic War. In 54 BC, Octavia's great-uncle Julius Caesar is said to have been anxious for her to divorce her husband so that she could marry Pompey, who had just lost his wife Julia (Caesar's daughter, and thus Octavia's cousin once removed). The couple did not want to get a divorce, so instead Pompey declined the proposal and married Cornelia Metella. Thus, Octavia's husband continued to oppose Julius Caesar, including in the crucial year of his consulship, 50 BC. Civil war broke out when Caesar invaded Italy from Gaul in 49 BC.

Marcellus, a friend of Cicero, was an initial opponent of Julius Caesar when Caesar invaded Italy, but did not take up arms against his wife's great uncle at the Battle of Pharsalus, and was eventually pardoned by him. In 47 BC he was able to intercede with Caesar for his cousin and namesake, also a former consul, then living in exile. Presumably, Octavia continued to live with her husband from the time of their marriage (she would have been between 12 and 15 when they married) to her husband's death. They had three surviving children: Claudia Marcella Major, Claudia Marcella Minor and Marcus Claudius Marcellus. All three were born in Italy. However, according to the anonymous Περὶ τοῦ καισαρείου γένους Octavia bore Marcellus four sons and four daughters. Her husband Marcellus died in May 40 BC.

=== Second marriage ===
Octavia depicted on an aureus of Mark Antony, 39 B.C.

By a Senatorial decree, Octavia married Mark Antony in October 40 BC, as his fourth wife (his third wife Fulvia having died shortly before). This marriage had to be approved by the Senate, as she was pregnant with her first husband's child, and was a politically motivated attempt to cement the uneasy alliance between her brother Octavian and Mark Antony; however, Octavia does appear to have been a loyal and faithful wife to Antony. Between 40 and 36 BC, she travelled with Antony to various provinces and lived with him in his Athenian mansion. There she raised her children by Marcellus as well as Antony's two sons; Antyllus and Iullus, as well as the two daughters of her marriage to Antony, Antonia Major and Antonia Minor who were born there. During this period, she became the first (or second) Roman woman to have coins minted bearing her image; only Antony's previous wife Fulvia may have pre-empted her.

=== Breakdown ===
The alliance was severely tested by Antony's abandonment of Octavia and their children in favor of his former lover Queen Cleopatra VII of Egypt (Antony and Cleopatra had met in 41 BC, an interaction that resulted in Cleopatra bearing twins, Alexander Helios, a boy, and Cleopatra Selene, a girl). After 36 BC, Octavia returned to Rome with the daughters of her second marriage. On several occasions she acted as a political advisor and negotiator between her husband and brother. For example, in early 37 BC, while pregnant with her daughter Antonia Minor, she was considered essential to an arms deal held at Tarentum, in which Antony and Augustus agreed to aid each other in their Parthian and Sicilian campaigns. She had won over her brother's advisers Agrippa and Maecenas and convinced him to renew their alliance. She was hailed as a "marvel of womankind".

In 35 BC, after Antony suffered a disastrous campaign in Parthia, Octavia brought fresh troops, provisions, and funds to Athens. There Antony had left a letter for her, instructing her to go no further. Antony divorced Octavia in late 33 BC. In 33, he sent men to eject her from his house in Rome. She became sole caretaker of their children, except for Antyllus, who was already with his father in the East. After Antony's suicide in 30 BC, her brother executed Antyllus but allowed Octavia to raise Antony's younger son Iullus by Fulvia as well as his children by Cleopatra (Alexander Helios, Cleopatra Selene, and Ptolemy Philadelphus).

=== Later life ===
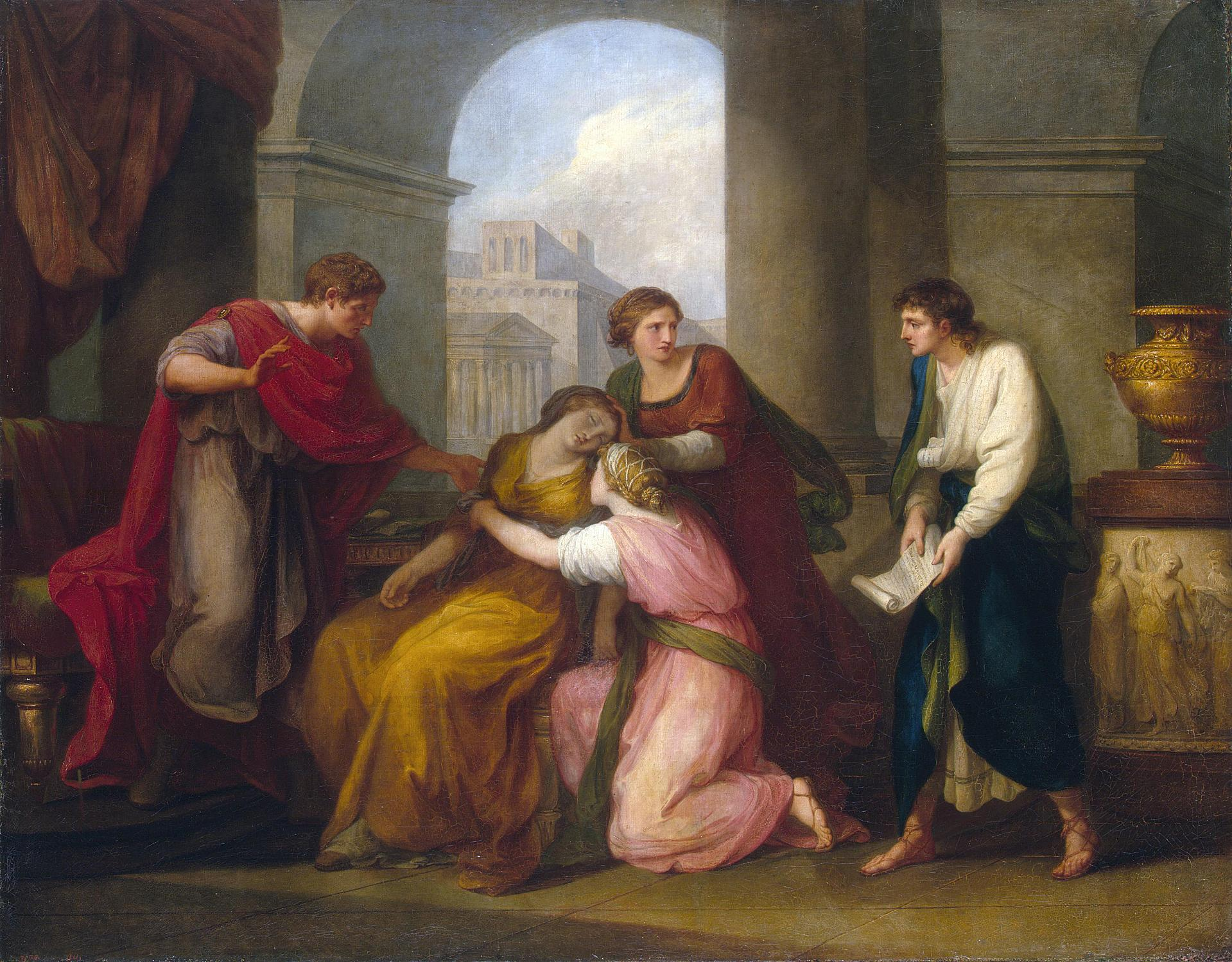
Virgil Reading the Aeneid to Augustus and Octavia (1788) by Angelica Kauffman

In 35 BC, Augustus accorded a number of honours and privileges to Octavia, and also to his wife, Livia – previously unheard of for women in Rome. They were granted sacrosanctitas, meaning it was illegal to verbally insult them. Previously, this had only been granted to tribunes. Livia and Octavia were made immune from tutela, the male guardianship which all women in Rome except for the Vestal Virgins were required to have. This meant they could freely manage their own finances. Finally, they were the first women in Rome to have statues and portraits displayed en masse in public places. Previously, only one woman, Cornelia, mother of the Gracchi, had been part of the public statues displayed in Rome. In Augustus' rebuilding of Rome as a city of marble, Octavia was featured. In all her representations, she wore the "nodus" hairstyle, which at the time was considered conservative and dignified, and worn by women from many classes.

Augustus adored, but never adopted, her son Marcellus. When Marcellus died of illness in 23 BC unexpectedly, Augustus was thunderstruck and Octavia disconsolate almost beyond recovery.

Aelius Donatus, in his Life of Vergil, states that Virgil

recited three whole books [of his Aeneid] for Augustus: the second, fourth, and sixth—this last out of his well-known affection for Octavia, who (being present at the recitation) is said to have fainted at the lines about her son, "... You shall be Marcellus" [Aen. 6.884]. Revived only with difficulty, she sent Virgil ten thousand sesterces for each of the verses."

She may have never fully recovered from the death of her son, and retired from public life, except on important occasions. The major source that Octavia never recovered is Seneca (De Consolatione ad Marciam, II.) but Seneca may wish to show off his rhetorical skill with hyperbole, rather than adhere to fact. Some dispute Seneca's version, as Octavia publicly opened the Library of Marcellus, dedicated in his memory, while her brother completed the building of Marcellus's theatre in his honor. Undoubtedly Octavia attended both ceremonies, as well as the Ara Pacis ceremony to welcome her brother's return in 13BC from the provinces. She was also consulted in regard to, and in some versions advised, that Augustus's daughter Julia marry Agrippa after her mourning for Marcellus ended. Agrippa had to divorce Octavia's daughter Claudia Marcella Major in order to marry Julia, so Augustus wanted Octavia's endorsement very much.

=== Death ===
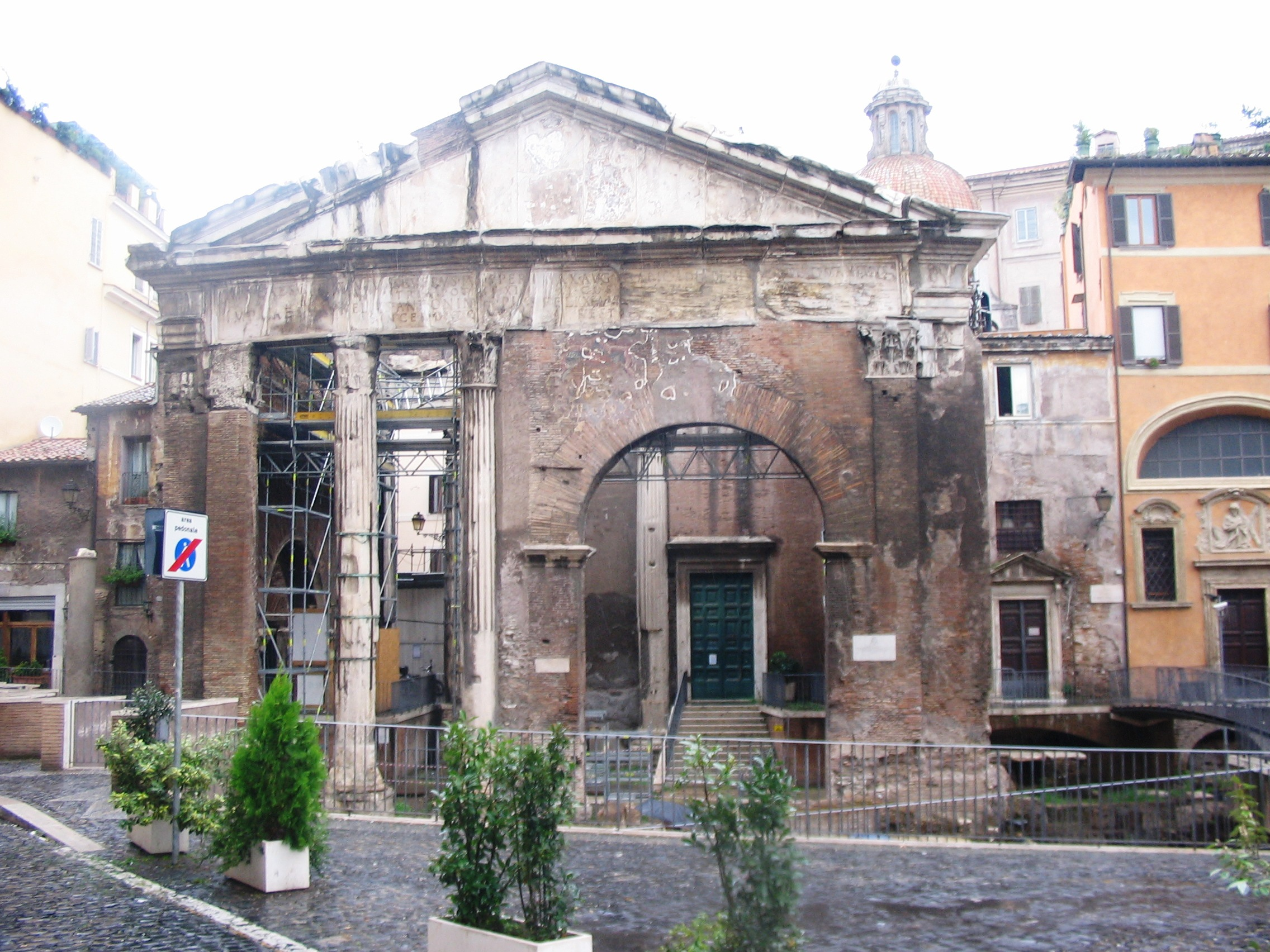
Today's appearance of the Porticus Octaviae.

Octavia died of natural causes. Suetonius says she died in Augustus' 54th year, thus 11 BC with Roman inclusive counting. Her funeral was a public one, with her sons-in-law (Drusus, Ahenobarbus, Iullus Antonius, and possibly Paullus Aemillius Lepidus) carrying her to the grave in the Mausoleum of Augustus. Drusus delivered one funeral oration from the rostra and Augustus gave her the highest posthumous honors (building the Gate of Octavia and Porticus Octaviae in her memory). Augustus also had the Roman senate declare his sister to be a goddess. Augustus declined some other honors decreed to her by the senate, for reasons unknown.

== Issue ==
Children with Marcellus

Octavia and her first husband had one son and two daughters who survived to adulthood.

1. Marcus Claudius Marcellus
2. Claudia Marcella Major
3. Claudia Marcella Minor

Children with Mark Antony

Octavia and Mark Antony had two surviving daughters by their marriage (her second, his fourth), and both were the ancestors of later Roman emperors.

1. Antonia Major: grandmother to Emperor Nero.
2. Antonia Minor: mother to Emperor Claudius, grandmother to Emperor Caligula, and great-grandmother to Emperor Nero.

== Descendants ==
Three Roman emperors, Caligula, Claudius and Nero, were amongst the most famous of her descendants.

- Octavia the Younger
  - Marcus Claudius Marcellus (42 BC – 23 BC), no issue
  - Claudia Marcella Major (born 41 BC)
    - Vipsania Marcella Major
    - Vipsania Marcella Minor
    - Iullus Antonius (? – ?), issue unknown
    - Lucius Antonius (20 BC – AD 25), issue unknown
    - Iulla Antonia (? – ?), issue unknown
  - Claudia Marcella Minor (born 40 BC)
    - Paullus Aemilius Regulus (? – ?), issue unknown
    - Claudia Pulchra (14 BC–26)
    - Marcus Valerius Messala Barbatus (11 BC – 20/21)
      - Marcus Valerius Messalla Corvinus (? – ?), possibly son of Aurelius Messalinus
      - Valeria Messalina (17 AD or 20 AD – 48 AD)
        - Claudia Octavia (39 AD or 40 AD – 62 AD), no issue
        - Tiberius Claudius Caesar Britannicus (41 AD – 55 AD), no issue
    - Valeria Messallia (c. 10 BC – ?)
      - Lucius Vipstanus Poplicola (c. 10 – after 59)
        - Gaius Valerius Poplicola (? – ?), issue unknown
      - Gaius Vipstanus Messalla Gallus (c. 10 BC – after 60)
        - Lucius Vipstanus Messalla (c. 45 – c. 80)
          - Lucius Vipstanus Messalla (c. 75 – after 115), according to some authors, this man may be one of Saint Melania's ancestors.
  - Antonia Major (39 BC – before 25 AD)
    - Domitia Lepida the Elder (c. 19 BC – 59 AD)
      - Quintus Haterius Antoninus (? – ?)
    - Gnaeus Domitius Ahenobarbus (17 BC – 40 AD)
      - Nero Claudius Caesar Augustus Germanicus (Lucius Domitius Ahenobarbus) (37 AD – 68 AD)
        - Claudia Augusta (January 63 AD – April 63 AD), died young
    - Domitia Lepida the Younger (10 BC – 54 AD)
      - Marcus Valerius Messalla Corvinus (same man as above), possibly son of Aurelius Messalinus or Valerius Barbatus (same man as above)
      - Valeria Messalina (same woman as above)
        - See her line above
      - Faustus Cornelius Sulla Felix (22 AD – 62 AD)
        - A son, died young
  - Antonia Minor (36 BC – 37 AD)
    - Germanicus Julius Caesar (15 BC – 19 AD)
      - Nero Julius Caesar Germanicus (6 AD – 30 AD), no issue
      - Drusus Julius Caesar Germanicus (8 AD – 33 AD), no issue
      - Tiberius Julius Caesar Germanicus (born between 7 and 12 AD), died as an infant
      - Ignotus (born between 7 and 12 AD), died as an infant
      - Gaius Julius Caesar Germanicus Major (born between 7 and 12 AD), died in childhood
      - Gaius Julius Caesar Augustus Germanicus (Caligula) (12 AD – 41 AD)
        - Julia Drusilla (39 AD – 41 AD), died young
      - Julia Agrippina (Agrippina Minor) (15 AD – 59)
        - Nero Claudius Caesar Augustus Germanicus (Lucius Domitius Ahenobarbus) (same man as above)
          - See his line above
      - Julia Drusilla (16 AD – 38 AD), no issue
      - Julia Livilla (18 AD – 42 AD), no issue
    - Claudia Livia Julia (Livilla) (13 BC – 31 AD)
      - Julia Livia (7 AD – 43 AD)
        - Gaius Rubellius Plautus (33 AD – 62 AD), had several children (Note: Their names are unknown, but it is known that all of them were killed by Nero, thus descent from this line is extinct.)
        - Gaius Rubellius Blandus (? – ?), issue unknown
        - Rubellius Drusus (? – ?), issue unknown
      - Tiberius Julius Caesar Nero Gemellus (19AD – 37 AD or 38 AD), no issue
      - Tiberius Claudius Caesar Germanicus II Gemellus (19 AD – 23 AD), died young
    - Tiberius Claudius Caesar Augustus Germanicus (10 BC – 54 AD)
      - Tiberius Claudius Drusus, died young
      - Claudia Antonia (c. 30 AD – 66 AD)
        - A son (same individual as above)
      - Claudia Octavia (same woman as above)
      - Tiberius Claudius Caesar Britannicus (same man as above)

== Cultural depictions ==
A famous anecdote, recorded in the late fourth-century vita of Virgil by Aelius Donatus, in which the poet read the passage in Book VI in praise of Octavia's late son Marcellus and Octavia fainted with grief, has inspired several works of art. The most famous example is Jean-Auguste-Dominique Ingres's 1812 painting Virgil reading The Aeneid before Augustus, Livia and Octavia but other artists, including Jean-Joseph Taillasson, Antonio Zucchi, Jean-Baptiste Wicar, Jean-Bruno Gassies and Angelica Kaufmann, have also been inspired to depict this scene.

In 17th century Spanish playwright Francisco de Rojas Zorilla's play, Cleopatra's Asps (Los Aspides de Cleopatra in Spanish) , wherein she is given the name Irene, Octavia is depicted as the slighted and vengeful wife of Marc Antony.

In William Shakespeare's play, Antony and Cleopatra, Octavia is described as a homely and frumpish woman.

Octavia is the titular character and narrator of the poet Allan Maclean's 1828 chapbook, "Octavia's Lament".

Octavia's later life, around the time of the death of Marcellus, is depicted in the 1976 television adaptation of Robert Graves's novel I, Claudius. The role was played by Angela Morant, and should not be confused with her great-granddaughter Claudia Octavia (also referred to as "Octavia" in the series), Claudius's daughter and wife of the future emperor Nero, who was played by Cheryl Johnson.

In the 1963 film Cleopatra, she is played by Jean Marsh in an uncredited role.

A highly fictionalized version of Octavia's early life is depicted in the 2005 television series Rome, in which Octavia of the Julii (Kerry Condon) seduces and sleeps with her younger brother, Gaius Octavian, has a lesbian affair with Servilia of the Junii (the series' version of Servilia) and a romantic relationship with Marcus Agrippa (based on the historical Marcus Vipsanius Agrippa), none of which has any historical basis.

In the TV series Domina (2021), Octavia was played by Alexandra Moloney and Claire Forlani.
