= Scribonia gens =

Ancient Roman family

The gens Scribonia was a plebeian family of ancient Rome. Members of this gens first appear in history at the time of the Second Punic War, but the first of the Scribonii to obtain the consulship was Gaius Scribonius Curio in 76 BC.

== Origin ==
The nomen Scribonius belongs to a large class of gentilicia derived from cognomina ending in -o, most of which were of plebeian origin. The root of the name is scribo, a writer.

== Praenomina ==
The only praenomina known to have been used by the main families of the Scribonii are Lucius, used by the Scribonii Libones, and Gaius, used by the Curiones. Other praenomina are practically non-existent among the Scribonii appearing in history; the only exception is Marcus, found among one or two of the later Libones, who seem to have adopted it from the Livii.

== Branches and cognomina ==
The two main families of the Scribonii under the Republic bore the cognomina Libo and Curio. Other surnames are found under the Empire.

Libo, the only surname of the Scribonii to occur on coins, is apparently derived from libere, to sprinkle or pour, and was probably given to an ancestor of the family who poured libations. The Scribonii Libones were long associated with a sacred structure in the forum known as the Pueal Scribonianum or Puteal Libonis, frequently depicted on their coins. So called because it resembled a puteal, or wellhead, the structure enclosed a "bidental", a place that had been struck by lightning, or in one tradition the spot where the whetstone of the augur Attius Navius had stood, in the time of Lucius Tarquinius Priscus. The Puteal Scribonianum was dedicated by one of the Scribonii Libones, probably either the praetor of 204 BC, or the tribune of the plebs in 149. It was renovated by Lucius Scribonius Libo, either the praetor of 80 BC, or his son, the consul of 34.

Curio became hereditary in one branch of the Scribonii after the first of the family was chosen curio maximus in 174 BC.

== Members ==
This list includes abbreviated praenomina. For an explanation of this practice, see filiation.

=== Scribonii Libones ===
- Lucius Scribonius Libo, tribune of the plebs in 216 BC, unsuccessfully petitioned the senate to ransom the Roman soldiers taken prisoner at Cannae. He was praetor peregrinus in 204, and assigned the province of Gaul.
- Lucius Scribonius (L. f.) Libo, as curule aedile in 194 BC, presided over the first celebration of the Megalesia at Rome. Praetor peregrinus in 192, he was assigned to prepare ships to bring the Roman army to Epirus. In 186, he was one of the commissioners to re-establish colonies at Sipontum and Buxentum.
- Lucius Scribonius (L. f. L. n.) Libo, tribune of the plebs in 149 BC, accused Servius Sulpicius Galba of atrocities against the Lusitani.
- Lucius Scribonius Libo, praetor in an uncertain year, was the father of Scribonia, the second wife of Augustus.
- Lucius Scribonius L. f. Libo, one of Pompeius' legates during the Civil War, and afterward a supporter of Sextus Pompeius. He was later reconciled to Octavian, who married his sister, Scribonia. Libo was consul in 34 BC, with Marcus Antonius.
- Scribonia L. f., second wife of Augustus, and mother of Julia, the emperor's only natural child. Augustus was her third husband, the first two also being of consular rank; one of them may have been Gnaeus Cornelius Lentulus Marcellinus. (Note: Surprisingly for a central figure in the imperial family, Scribonia's first two husbands have long defied identification. Scribonia had a daughter named Cornelia, and seemingly a son named Lentulus Marcellinus.)
- Lucius Scribonius L. f. L. n. Drusus Libo, the natural son of the consul of 34 BC he was adopted by Marcus Livius Drusus Claudianus as Marcus Livius L. f. L. n. Drusus Libo, and served as consul in 15 BC.
- Scribonia L. f. L. n., daughter of the consul of 34 BC, married Sextus Pompeius, and was the mother of his daughter Pompeia.
- Lucius Scribonius L. f. L. n. Libo, consul in AD 16. Son or grandson of the consul of 15 BC.
- Marcus Scribonius Libo Drusus, brother of the consul of 16 AD, he was accused to revolt against emperor Tiberius
- Scribonia L. f. L. n., daughter of Lucius Scribonius Libo, the consul of AD 16, married Marcus Licinius Crassus Frugi, consul in AD 27.
- Lucius Scribonius L. f. L. n. Libo, accused of plotting against Tiberius, he took his own life rather than submit to the inevitable sentence of death.
- Lucius Scribonius Libo, curator of the banks of the Tiber during the reign of Claudius.

=== Scribonii Curiones ===
- Gaius Scribonius Curio, plebeian aedile in 196 BC, and praetor urbanus in 193, was named Curio Maximus in 174 BC, after his predecessor died in a pestilence.
- Gaius Scribonius Curio, praef soc 181 BC, probably son of the above, maybe also to be identical with the C. Scribonius who was moneyer in 154 BC.
- Gaius Scribonius Curio, praetor in 121 BC, was a famous orator, greatly admired by Cicero, who laments that the speeches of Curio had been largely forgotten. He was noted for his defense of Servius Fulvius Flaccus, the consul of 135 BC, on a charge of incestum.
- Gaius Scribonius C. f. Curio, consul in 76 BC, and afterward proconsul of Macedonia, where he fought against the Dardani and the Thracians. On his return to Rome about 72, he received a triumph for his conquest of the Dardani.
- Gaius Scribonius C. f. C. n. Curio, one of Caesar's supporters at the beginning of the Civil War. He successfully occupied Sicily, but was defeated and killed at the Bagradas, when he attempted to carry the war over to Africa.
- Gaius Scribonius C. f. C. n. Curio, the son of Curio, Caesar's legate, by Fulvia, and the stepson of Mark Antony, was put to death by Octavian after the Battle of Actium, together with Antony's son, Antyllus, and Caesarion.

=== Others ===
- Scribonius Aphrodisius, a Latin grammarian, had been a slave of the grammarian Lucius Orbilius Pupillus, but was purchased by Scribonia, the wife of Augustus, who gave him his freedom.
- Scribonius, an usurper who attempted briefly seized the throne of the Bosporan Kingdom about 16 BC, by claiming to be a descendant of Mithridates. His deception was soon discovered, and he was put to death.
- Scribonius Proculus, a senator in the time of Caligula, slain by his fellows at the prompting of Protogenes, one of the emperor's creatures.
- Scribonius Largus, a physician of Claudius, whom he accompanied to Britain, and the author of De Compositione Medicamentorum, quoted by Galen, as well as several other works that do not survive.
- Publius Sulpicius Scribonius Proculus, the brother of Scribonius Rufus, was governor of either Germania Superior or Germania Inferior in the time of Nero, while his brother was governor of the other province. Both were accused, and summoned to account to Nero in Greece, where they took their own lives, upon perceiving no hope of survival.
- Scribonius Rufus, the brother of Scribonius Proculus, took his life when denounced to Nero.

== See also ==
- List of Roman gentes

== Bibliography ==
- Marcus Tullius Cicero, Brutus, De Inventione, De Oratore, Epistulae ad Atticum, Epistulae ad Familiares, Rhetorica ad Herennium (attributed).
- Gaius Julius Caesar, Commentarii de Bello Gallico (Commentaries on the Gallic War), Commentarii de Bello Civili (Commentaries on the Civil War).
- Titus Livius (Livy), History of Rome.
- Marcus Velleius Paterculus, Compendium of Roman History.
- Valerius Maximus, Factorum ac Dictorum Memorabilium (Memorable Facts and Sayings).
- Marcus Annaeus Lucanus (Lucan), Pharsalia.
- Scribonius Largus, De Compositione Medicamentorum (On the Composition of Medicines).
- Lucius Annaeus Seneca (Seneca the Younger), Epistulae Morales ad Lucilium (Moral Letters to Lucilius).
- Gaius Plinius Secundus (Pliny the Elder), Historia Naturalis (Natural History).
- Marcus Fabius Quintilianus (Quintilian), Institutio Oratoria (Institutes of Oratory).
- Publius Cornelius Tacitus, Annales, Historiae, Dialogus de Oratoribus (Dialogue on Oratory).
- Gaius Suetonius Tranquillus, De Vita Caesarum (Lives of the Caesars, or The Twelve Caesars), De Claris Rhetoribus (On the Eminent Orators), De Illustribus Grammaticis (On the Illustrious Grammarians).
- Plutarchus, Lives of the Noble Greeks and Romans.
- Lucius Annaeus Florus, Epitome de T. Livio Bellorum Omnium Annorum DCC (Epitome of Livy: All the Wars of Seven Hundred Years).
- Appianus Alexandrinus (Appian), Bella Mithridatica (The Mithridatic Wars), Bellum Civile (The Civil War).
- Aelius Galenus (Galen), De Compositione Medicamentorum Secundum Locos Conscriptorum (On the Composition of Medications According to the Place Prescribed).
- Pseudo-Lucian, Macrobii.
- Cassius Dio, Roman History.
- Gaius Julius Solinus, De Mirabilis Mundi (On the Wonders of the World).
- Eutropius, Breviarium Historiae Romanae (Abridgement of the History of Rome).
- Paulus Orosius, Historiarum Adversum Paganos (History Against the Pagans).
- Johann Caspar von Orelli, Onomasticon Tullianum, Orell Füssli, Zürich (1826–1838).
- Dictionary of Greek and Roman Biography and Mythology, William Smith, ed., Little, Brown and Company, Boston (1849).
- René Cagnat et alii, L'Année épigraphique (The Year in Epigraphy, abbreviated AE), Presses Universitaires de France (1888–present).
- August Pauly, Georg Wissowa, et alii, Realencyclopädie der Classischen Altertumswissenschaft (Scientific Encyclopedia of the Knowledge of Classical Antiquities, abbreviated RE or PW), J. B. Metzler, Stuttgart (1894–1980).
- George Davis Chase, "The Origin of Roman Praenomina", in Harvard Studies in Classical Philology, vol. VIII, pp. 103–184 (1897).
- Paul von Rohden, Elimar Klebs, & Hermann Dessau, Prosopographia Imperii Romani (The Prosopography of the Roman Empire, abbreviated PIR), Berlin (1898).
- T. Robert S. Broughton, The Magistrates of the Roman Republic, American Philological Association (1952–1986).
- Hewson Crawford, Michael (1974). Roman Republican Coinage. Vol. 1 (new ed.). Cambridge University Press. ISBN 9780521074926.
- Hallett, Judith P. (2014). Fathers and Daughters in Roman Society: Women and the Elite Family. Princeton Legacy Library. Vol. 682. Princeton University Press. ISBN 9781400855322.
