= Servius Fulvius Flaccus =

Servius Fulvius Flaccus was a member of the Roman plebs gens Fulvia family and was consul in 135 BC. He put down an uprising among the Ardiaei in Illyria. Cicero described him as a literary and elegant man. He was, however, accused of incest and was defended by Gaius Curio.
