= Fulvia gens =

Ancient Roman family

The gens Fulvia, originally Foulvia, was one of the most illustrious plebeian families at ancient Rome. Members of this gens first came to prominence during the middle Republic; the first to attain the consulship was Lucius Fulvius Curvus in 322 BC. From that time, the Fulvii were active in the politics of the Roman state, and gained a reputation for excellent military leaders.

== Origin ==
The nomen Fulvius is evidently of Latin origin, and is derived from the cognomen Fulvus, originally designating someone with yellowish or golden-brown hair. Cicero reports that the Fulvii originally came to Rome from Tusculum, where some of them remained in his era. According to tradition, they obtained their sacra from Hercules after the completion of his twelve labours. By the latter part of the fourth century BC, they had joined the nobiles through the patronage of the Fabii, who supported the successful candidacy of Lucius Fulvius Curvus for the consulship.

== Praenomina ==
The earliest branch of the Fulvii used the praenomina Lucius, Marcus, and Quintus, which they occasionally supplemented with other names, including Gaius, Gnaeus, and Servius. Lucius disappears early, and was not used by the later Fulvii. The Fulvii Centumali mentioned in history bore Gnaeus and Marcus exclusively, while the Flacci depended on Marcus and Quintus, supplemented by Gnaeus, Servius, and Gaius. Fulvii with other praenomina occur toward the end of the Republic.

== Branches and cognomina ==
The Fulvii of the Republic bore a variety of cognomina, including Bambalio, Centumalus, Curvus, Flaccus, Gillo, Nobilior, Paetinus, and Veratius or Neratius.

Curvus, which means "bent" or "crooked," is the first cognomen of the Fulvii to occur in history, and belongs to a large class of surnames derived from a person's physical characteristics. Members of this family subsequently bore the surnames Paetinus and Nobilior, which displaced Curvus.

Paetinus, derived from Paetus, was a common surname originally referring to someone with a slight cast in the eye. Pliny the Elder mentions it alongside Strabo, which also indicated a defect of vision, but Horace indicates that paetus describes a lesser distortion than strabo, giving as an example a fond father referring to his cross-eyed son as paetus instead of strabo to minimise the defect. The slight distortion indicated by Paetus was even considered endearing, and it was an epithet of Venus, with much the same meaning as the modern proverb, "love is blind".

As the cognomen of Curvus was superseded by that of Paetinus, so the latter was in turn superseded by Nobilior, meaning "very noble". This name seems to have been first assumed by the consul of 255 BC, perhaps with the implication that he was more noble than the other Fulvii; his descendants dropped the name of Paetinus.

Centumalus is a cognomen of obscure meaning. From the filiation of Gnaeus Fulvius Maximus Centumalus, the consul of 298 BC, and the first of this surname, it appears probable that he was the brother of Marcus Fulvius Paetinus, the consul of the preceding year, in which case the Centumali were also descended from the Fulvii Curvi.

Flaccus, meaning "flabby", or "flop-eared", was the name of a prominent family of the Fulvia gens, which first appears in history around the beginning of the First Punic War. They were presumably descended from the same family as the other Fulvii of the Republic, but the exact manner of the relationship is unclear, unless perhaps they were descended from a younger son of Marcus Fulvius Curvus Paetinus, consul in 305 BC.

The surname Bambalio, belonging to one of the Fulvii of Tusculum, alluded to his tendency to stammer.

To this list, some scholars append Nacca, or Natta, a fuller, based on a Lucius Natta, supposedly the brother-in-law of Publius Clodius Pulcher. Cicero mentions this Natta on two occasions, but does not mention his gentile name. Servius calls him Pinarius Natta, in a passage of uncertain genuineness, but the only known wife of Clodius was Fulvia; thus it has been speculated that her brother could have been Lucius Fulvius Natta, although that surname is otherwise unknown in the Fulvia gens. Ronald Syme argued that it was possible that Natta was a maternal half-brother of Fulvia, from an earlier marriage of her mother to a Pinarius Natta. Drumann, however, provides reason to suppose that Clodius was married twice, and that his first wife was Pinaria; in which case Natta was not the brother of Fulvia.

== Members ==
This list includes abbreviated praenomina. For an explanation of this practice, see filiation.

=== Fulvii Curvi, Paetini, et Nobiliores ===
- Lucius Fulvius, the grandfather of Lucius Fulvius Curvus, consul in 322 BC.
- Lucius Fulvius L. f., the father of Lucius, consul in 322 BC.
- Gnaeus Fulvius, the grandfather of Marcus Fulvius Paetinus, consul in 299 BC.
- Gnaeus Fulvius Cn. f., the father of Marcus, consul in 299, and perhaps also of Gnaeus Fulvius Maximus Centumalus, consul in 298.
- Lucius Fulvius L. f. L. n. Curvus, consul in BC 322, with Quintus Fabius Maximus Rullianus. Supposedly he had been consul of Tusculum at the time that town revolted against Rome, but upon going over to the Romans, was invested with the same office. He and his colleague triumphed over the Tusculans, and in some accounts, over the Samnites as well. Magister equitum in 316, he and the dictator, Lucius Aemilius Mamercinus, besieged Saticula, and defeated the Samnites.
- Marcus Fulvius L. f. L. n. Curvus Paetinus, consul suffectus in 305 BC, following the death of the consul Tiberius Minucius Augurinus in battle against the Samnites. According to some accounts, he took the town of Bovianum, and celebrated a triumph over the Samnites.
- Marcus Fulvius Cn. f. Cn. n. Paetinus, consul in BC 299.
- Gaius Fulvius Curvus, one of the plebeian aediles in 296 BC; he and his colleague used fines from grazers to host games, and donate golden chalices to Ceres
- Marcus Fulvius M. f. L. n. Paetinus, the son of Marcus Fulvius Curvus Paetinus, consul in 305 BC, and father of Servius Fulvius Paetinus Nobilior, consul in 255.
- Servius Fulvius Paetinus M. f. M. n. Nobilior, consul in BC 255, with Marcus Aemilius Paullus, during the First Punic War. Following the defeat of Regulus in Africa at the beginning of the year, the consuls were dispatched with a fleet of at least three hundred ships to bring away the survivors. Near Hermaea, the Roman fleet gained a brilliant victory over the Carthaginians, who suffered very heavy losses. On its return to Italy, the fleet met a fearful storm, and was almost totally destroyed; but both consuls survived, and celebrated a triumph in the following year.
- Marcus Fulvius Ser. f. M. n. Nobilior, the son of Servius Fulvius Nobilior, consul in BC 255, and father of Marcus Fulvius Nobilior, consul in 189.
- Marcus Fulvius M. f. Ser. n. Nobilior, as praetor in 193 BC, obtained the province of Hispania Ulterior, where he defeated the Vaccaei, Tectones, and Celtiberi, receiving an ovation; as consul in 189, and fought against the Aetolians, triumphing the following year. He was censor in 179.
- Quintus Fulvius Nobilior, one of the triumviri appointed in 184 BC to establish colonies at Potentia and Pisaurum. Cicero identifies him with the consul of 153 BC, who was the son of the consul of 189; but it is improbable that someone who held such an important office in 184 should have been elected consul thirty-one years later; and a Quintus Fulvius Nobilior whom Livy mentions as a boy in 180 would have been the right age to achieve the consulship in 153, but certainly would not have been given the responsibility of establishing two colonies while still a child, four years earlier.
- Marcus Fulvius Nobilior, military tribune in 180 BC, he served under the consul Aulus Postumius Albinus Luscus in Liguria. After dismissing his forces without authority, he was punished by being sent to Hispania Ulterior. Broughton notes great difficulty determining his identity, due to a number of similarly named Fulvii, and inconsistent sources.
- Marcus Fulvius M. f. M. n. Nobilior, consul in BC 159, he appears to have carried on the war against the Eleates in Liguria, over whom he celebrated a triumph the following year.
- Quintus Fulvius M. f. M. n. Nobilior, consul in BC 153, the first year that the consuls entered upon their office upon the kalends of January, instead of the ides of March. Sent against the Celtiberi, he suffered a terrible defeat on the day of the Vulcanalia, the 23rd of August, a day which was ever after ill-omened to all Roman generals. Although Fulvius was able to inflict severe losses on the enemy, a stampede of his own elephants led to a second devastating defeat later in the year. He was censor in 136.
- Marcus Fulvius Nobilior, one of Catiline's conspirators. A man of this name was condemned in BC 54, on unknown charges; he may be the same person.

=== Fulvii Centumali ===
- Gnaeus Fulvius Cn. f. Cn. n. Maximus Centumalus, consul in 298 BC, triumphed over the Samnites and the Etruscans. Probably the same man as the Gnaeus Fulvius Maximus Centumalus who was dictator in 263 BC.
- Gnaeus Fulvius Cn. f. Cn. n. Centumalus, consul in BC 229 with Lucius Postumius Albinus; they conducted the war in Illyria, with great success, and Fulvius triumphed over the Illyrians.
- Gnaeus Fulvius Cn. f. Cn. n. Centumalus Maximus, consul in 211 BC; his command prolonged the following year, he was defeated and perished in battle against Hannibal.
- Marcus Fulvius Centumalus, praetor urbanus in BC 192, superintended the building of fifty quinqueremes, in preparation for the war against Antiochus the Great.

=== Fulvii Flacci ===
- Marcus Fulvius, the grandfather of Marcus Fulvius Flaccus, consul in 264 BC, might perhaps be the same as Marcus Fulvius Curvus Paetinus, the consul of 305.
- Quintus Fulvius M. f., the father of Marcus, consul in 264 BC.
- Marcus Fulvius Q. f. M. n. Flaccus, consul in 264 BC, the year in which the First Punic War broke out.
- Quintus Fulvius M. f. Q. n. Flaccus, consul in 237, 224, 212, and 209 BC, magister equitum in 213 and dictator in 210; he was one of Rome's most successful generals, before and during the Second Punic War, but his legacy was tarnished by the severity with which he treated the defeated Capuans in 211.
- Gnaeus Fulvius M. f. Q. n. Flaccus, praetor in 212 BC, during the third consulship of his brother, Quintus; he received Apulia as his province, and was defeated with great losses by Hannibal near Herdonia. Charged with losing his army through lack of caution and prudence, he was found to have behaved cowardly, and went into voluntary exile at Tarquinii.
- Gaius Fulvius M. f. Q. n. Flaccus, served as legate under his brother, Quintus, at the siege of Capua, 211 BC. In 209, he was ordered to conduct a detachment of troops into Etruria, and bring back to Rome the legions which had been stationed there. He might be the same Gaius Fulvius who, as quaestor in 218, had been captured by the Boii.
- Marcus Fulvius Flaccus, one of the decemviri agris assignandis, appointed in 201 BC to assign lands in Samnium and Apulia to veterans who had served under Scipio in Africa.
- Gnaeus Fulvius (Flaccus), Praetor Peregrinus in 190 BC.
- Marcus Fulvius Flaccus, one of the triumvirs appointed to conduct colonies to Pollentia and Pisaurum, in 184 BC.
- Quintus Fulvius Cn. f. M. n. Flaccus, praetor in 187 BC, and consul suffectus in 180. As consul, he received the province of Liguria. He sent 7,000 Apuani to Samnium.
- Quintus Fulvius Q. f. M. n. Flaccus, as praetor in 182 BC, he received the province of Hispania Citerior, where he won several victories over the Celtiberians, triumphing in 180 BC. He was consul in 179, with his brother, Lucius Manlius Acidinus Fulvianus, and triumphed over the Ligurians. He was censor in 174.
- Gnaeus Fulvius Q. f. M. n. Flaccus, brother of the consul of 179 BC, was expelled from the senate during the latter's censorship.
- Marcus Fulvius Q. f. M. n. Flaccus, served as legate under his brother, Quintus, against the Celtiberians, 182 BC.
- (Lucius?) Fulvius Q. f. M. n. Flaccus, a younger son of the consul of 237, 224, 212, and 209 BC; he was adopted by Lucius Manlius Acidinus, and became Lucius Manlius Acidinus Fulvianus. As praetor in 188 BC, he obtained the province of Hispania Citerior, where he remained until 186, defeating the Celtiberi; in consequence he received an ovation. He was consul in 179 BC, with his brother, Quintus, who had triumphed over the Celtiberi the preceding year.
- Servius Fulvius Q. f. Flaccus, consul in 135 BC, subdued the Vardaeans in Illyricum. Cicero calls him a literary and eloquent man. He was on one occasion accused of incest, and was ably defended by Gaius Scribonius Curio.
- Gaius Fulvius Q. f. Cn. n. Flaccus, consul in 134 BC, during the First Servile War; he obtained the command in Sicily, and proceeded against the slaves, but with little success.
- Marcus Fulvius M. f. Q. n. Flaccus, consul in 125 BC, aided the Massilians against the Saluvii, and triumphed over the transalpine Ligures. A staunch ally of Gaius Gracchus, and supporter of his agrarian law, his attempts to supply Gracchus with an armed force led to failed negotiations with the senatorial party, and he was put to death, together with his elder son.
- Fulvia M. f. M. n., daughter of Marcus Fulvius Flaccus, the consul of 125 BC, married Publius Cornelius Lentulus, and was the mother of Publius Cornelius Lentulus Sura.
- Fulvia M. f. M. n., another daughter of Marcus Fulvius Flaccus, the consul of 125 BC, married a brother of Quintus Lutatius Catulus.
- Fulvia M. f. M. n., a third daughter of Marcus Fulvius Flaccus, the consul of 125 BC, married Lucius Julius Caesar, consul in 90 BC.

=== Fulvii Gillones ===
- Quintus Fulvius Gillo, a legate of Scipio Africanus, who sent him to Carthage in 203 BC. He was praetor in 200, and obtained Sicily as his province.
- Gnaeus Fulvius (Q. f.) Gillo, probably the son of Quintus, was praetor in 167 BC, and received the province of Hispania Citerior.
- Marcus Fulvius Gillo, consul suffectus in AD 76, and governor of Asia from 89 to 90.
- Quintus Fulvius Gillo Bittius Proculus, consul suffectus in AD 98. His stepdaughter was the second wife of Pliny the Younger.

=== Others ===
- Marcus Fulvius Bambalio, of Tusculum, a man of no account, married Sempronia, daughter of Sempronius Tuditanus. Their daughter, Fulvia, was the wife of Marcus Antonius. Fulvius received the nickname Bambalio on account of a hesitancy in his speech.
- Fulvia, a noblewoman who revealed the Catilinarian conspiracy to Cicero.
- Fulvia M. f., daughter of Marcus Fulvius Bambalio, married Publius Clodius Pulcher; after his murder in 52 BC, she married Gaius Scribonius Curio. Following his death in the African War, 49 BC, she became the third wife of Marcus Antonius, the triumvir; in 41 she helped to instigate the Perusine War.
- Publius Fulvius Veratius or Neratius, whom Cicero calls a lectissimus homo, accused Titus Annius Milo in BC 52.
- Aulus Fulvius, a member of the second Catilinarian conspiracy, in 63 BC. While he was on his way to Catiline, his father was informed of his son's design, and, overtaking him, ordered that the younger Fulvius be put to death.
- Fulvia Pia, the mother of Lucius Septimius Severus, emperor from AD 193 to 211.
- Gaius Fulvius Plautianus, praetorian prefect under Septimius Severus, to whom he may have been related. Having achieved great wealth and power, he succeeded in having his daughter, Fulvia Plautilla, married to Caracalla, the future emperor. But as Caracalla despised both his bride and his father-in-law, Plautianus anticipated his downfall, and in AD 203 was put to death on the accusation that he was plotting against the emperor and his family.
- Fulvia Plautilla, the wife of Caracalla, was banished and put to death in AD 212, following the murder of the emperor's brother, Geta.
- Fulvius Plautius, the brother of Fulvia Plautilla, along with whom he was banished and put to death in AD 212.
- Fulvius Diogenianus, a former consul, noted for his imprudent freedom of speech during the reign of Macrinus.
- Fulvius, praefectus urbi in AD 222, was torn to pieces, along with Aurelius Eubulus, by the soldiers and people, in the massacre which followed the death of Elagabalus, and was succeeded in office by the notorious Eutychianus Comazon. He may perhaps be the same person as the consular, Fulvius Diogenianus.
- Gaius Fulvius Maximus, legate of Dalmatia in the reign of Severus Alexander.
- Marcus Laelius Fulvius Maximus Aemilianus, consul ordinarius in AD 227.
- Fulvius Pius, consul in AD 238.
- Fulvius Aemilianus, consul in AD 244.
- Fulvius Asprianus, a historian, who detailed at great length the doings of the emperor Carinus.

== See also ==
- List of Roman gentes
