= Numidio Quadrato (Rome Metro) =

Rome metro station

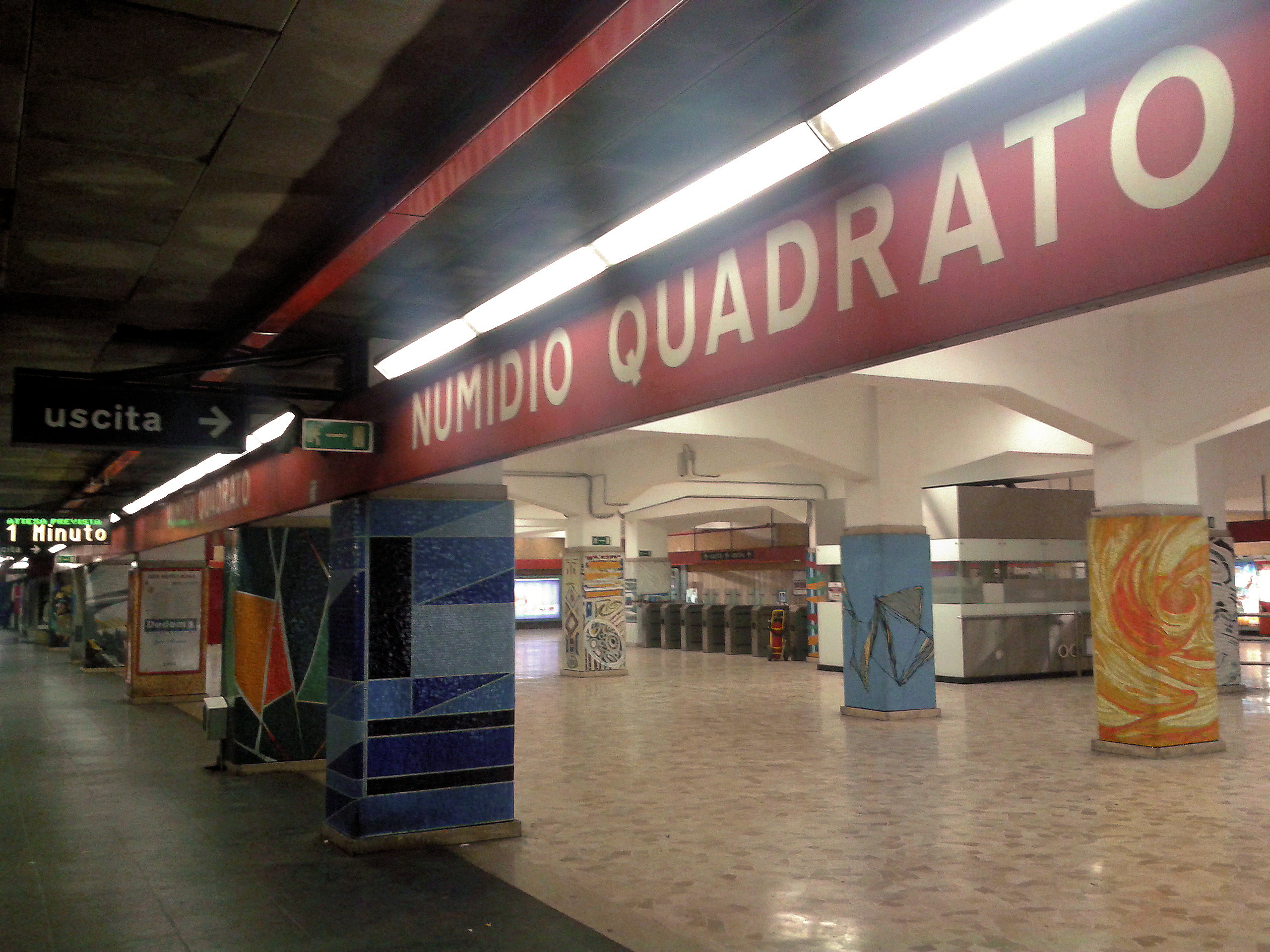

General information
- Coordinates: 41.8621°N 12.5527°E
- Owner: ATAC
- Platforms: Side platform
- Tracks: 2

Construction
- Structure type: Underground

History
- Opened: 1980; 46 years ago

Services
Preceding station	Rome Metro	Following station
Porta Furba - Quadraro towards Battistini	Line A	Lucio Sestio towards Anagnina
Location
- Click on the map to see marker

Numidio Quadrato is a station on the Rome Metro. It is on Line A and is located in the Quadraro district of Rome, under the intersection of Via Tuscolana and Via Scribonio Curione. The station is named after Via Numidio Quadrato, a nearby road whose name changed in 1980.

== Structure ==
The station features many mosaic art works as a part of Rome Metro art programs.

The platforms in this station are much larger than most stations on Line A. This is because it was originally planned to be a transfer station with Line D. This is no longer a possible situation as Line D has been rerouted to another part of Rome.
