= Marcus Fulvius Bambalio =

Ancient Roman nobleman

Marcus Fulvius Bambalio was a nobleman of the Fulvia gens of ancient Rome, who lived in the 1st century BCE. Based on his cognomen, and invective directed at him by his contemporaries, he must have had a speech disorder ("Bambalio" is derived from the Greek verb βαμβάλειν, meaning "to stutter"). It is unclear what exactly his social rank was; scholars disagree on whether he was or was not a nobilis, as contemporary writers would draw unfavorable comparisons between Fulvius's social rank and that of his son-in-law, Mark Antony.

Though he may be said to be the "last of the noble Fulvii" -- in the sense that it was possible he was the last male of his line to bear the name -- more often he is described as dull and unpopular with his contemporaries. The writer Cicero called him "a complete nobody", and "stupid and ridiculous". Cicero in particular took the man's stutter as either evidence of, or a metaphor for, his poor moral character. There is no evidence that he ever ran for or held public office, possibly because of his stutter, as excellence in public speaking was a de facto requirement.

He was the second husband of Sempronia, daughter of Sempronius Tuditanus, with whom he had a daughter named Fulvia, who was first married to Publius Clodius Pulcher, then Gaius Scribonius Curio, and then finally the triumvir, Mark Antony, who received -- or inherited from Fulvius -- the nickname "Bambalio" on account of a certain hesitancy he had in his speech.

Sempronia's third husband, a man named Murena, made the paternal arrangements for his stepdaughter Fulvia's marriage to Clodius, which suggests Fulvius may have been dead by this time.
