= Lamprias =

Grandfather of Plutarch

Lamprias (Greek: Λαμπρίας) was the grandfather of the Greek biographer and philosopher Plutarch. He appears as a character in several of Plutarch's works, notably the Table Talks. He is also mentioned in Plutarch's Life of Antony as a friend of Philotas, the latter being one of Mark Antony's court physicians and a witness for some of the stories Plutarch relates about Antony and Cleopatra. Elsewhere Plutarch quotes him making ironic observations about Jewish dietary laws.

According to Plutarch, Lamprias was a man of eloquence and imagination. Very little is known of his life apart from what can be gleaned from Plutarch's writing. He probably lived, like Plutarch, in Chaeronea of Boeotia, in Central Greece.
