= Lucio Sestio (Rome Metro) =

Rome metro station

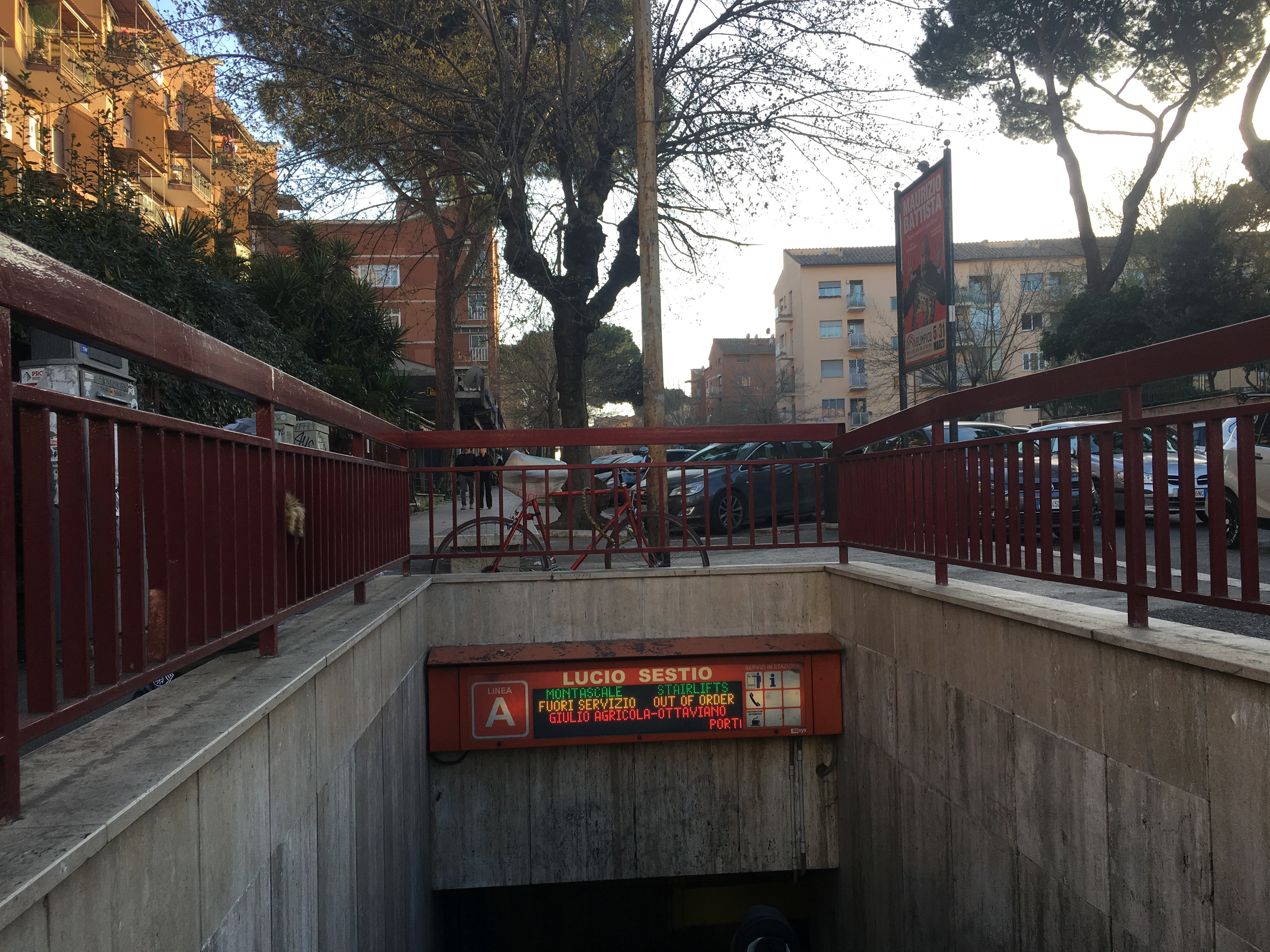
- Entrance to Lucio Sestio station, March 2019

General information
- Coordinates: 41.8599°N 12.5571°E
- Owner: ATAC
- Platforms: Side platform
- Tracks: 2

Construction
- Structure type: Underground

History
- Opened: 1980; 46 years ago

Services
Preceding station	Rome Metro	Following station
Numidio Quadrato towards Battistini	Line A	Giulio Agricola towards Anagnina
Location
- Click on the map to see marker

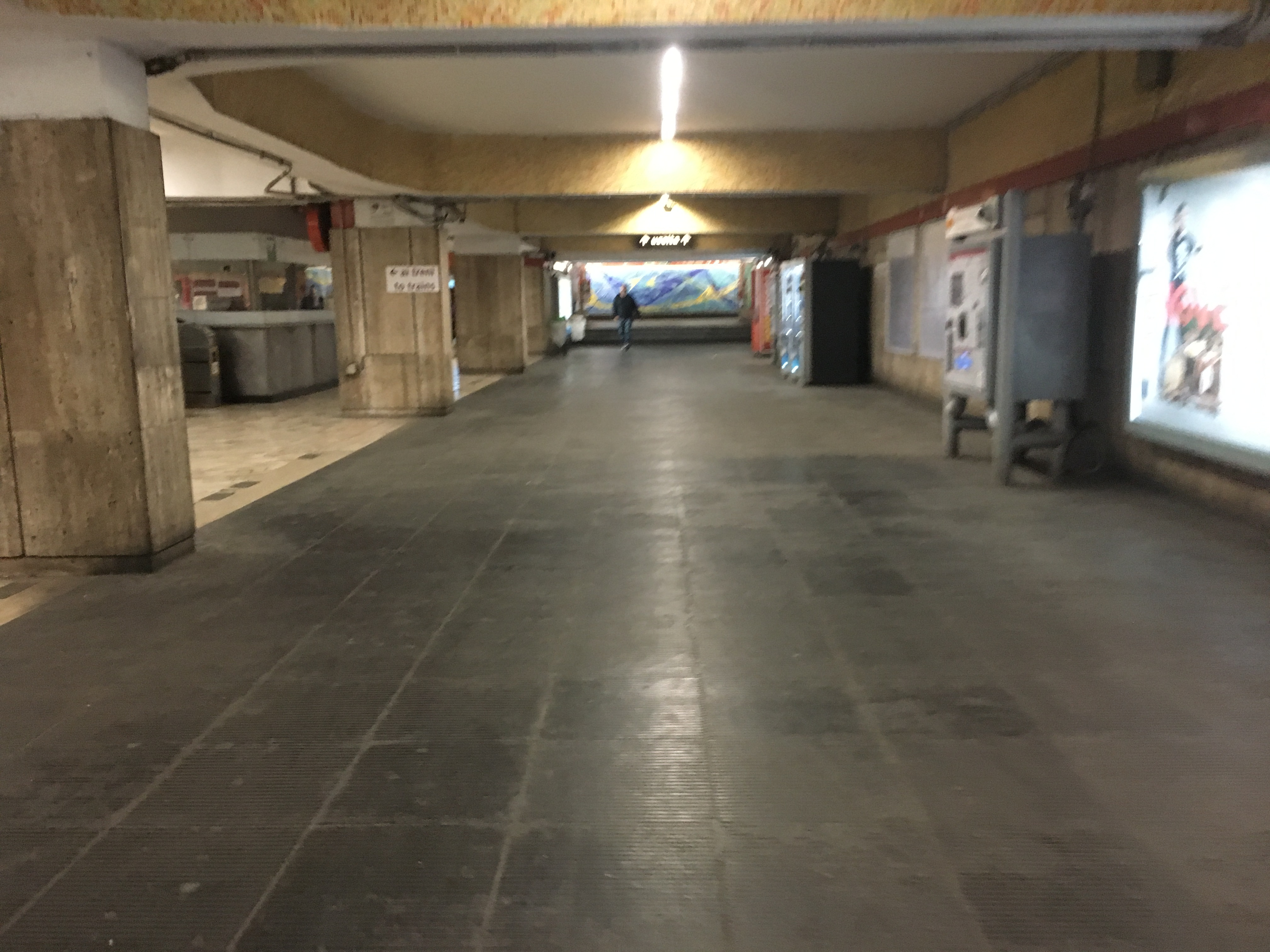
Interior of Lucio Sestio station, March 2019

Lucio Sestio is a station on the Rome Metro. It is on Line A and is located in the Don Bosco district of Rome under the intersection of Via Tuscolana with Via Lucio Sestio and Via Ponzio Cominio.
