= Publius Claudius Pulcher (son of Clodius) =

1st-century BC Roman patrician and praetor

- Spouse(s): Unknown; Claudia Marcella Minor (possibly)
- Children: Claudius Pulcher; Claudia Pulchra (possibly)
- Parents: Publius Clodius Pulcher (father); Fulvia (mother)

Publius Claudius Pulcher (possibly born Publius Clodius Pulcher; c. 69/59 BC (Note: Tatum (Patrician Tribune p. 61) points out that in 44 BC, Claudius could still be called a puer, "boy", though granting that age categories such as puer, adolescens and iuvenis are fluid.) – after 31 BC) was a son of Publius Clodius Pulcher and his wife Fulvia. He was briefly the brother-in-law of Octavian (the future emperor Augustus) through Octavian's marriage to his sister Claudia.

== Biography ==
=== Early life ===
Publius, who was the son of Publius Clodius Pulcher and Fulvia, had one full sister Claudia, and three half-brothers, Gaius Scribonius Curio, Marcus Antonius Antyllus and Iullus Antonius from his mother's later marriages to Gaius Scribonius Curio (married in 52 BC) and Mark Antony (married in 49 BC). His father Clodius might have been married to a woman named Pinaria Natta before Fulvia, but there are no children known from this possible match.

It is not known exactly when he was born, but he was still referred to as a "boy" (puer) in 44 BC and he was likely born no earlier than 60 BC.

In 59 Publius's father (who was born as a patrician) was adopted by a man of plebeian status named Publius Fonteius and changed the spelling of his own name from Publius Claudius Pulcher to Publius Clodius Pulcher. (Note: It is unknown if Publius and his sister Claudia were considered plebeian or patrician.) If Publius was born after this he might have been born under the name "Clodius", although it is known that he reverted to the patrician spelling at some point after his father's death.

In 52 BC when his father was killed by Titus Annius Milo and his followers, there were accusations that Milo had also had a slave abduct the boy from his father's villa in Alba and bring him to see the body of his father and to demand that he allow them to cut up Clodius' body. At his father's funeral he was not considered old enough to deliver a funeral oration. (Note: For context, the future emperor Tiberius delivered a funeral oration to his father when he was nine years old.) Around this time he was referred to as a parvulus which would mean "little child". (Note: Exactly how old a boy called parvulus would be is disputed, possibly referring to a child directly after infancy, around two years old, or even to as old as between six and ten years old.)

Publius appears to have been raised by his mother's last husband Mark Antony. As a young man he likely asked for Antony to recall the exiled Sextus Cloelius (sometimes called "Sextus Clodius") as a favour. Sextus had been a major supporter of his father. His younger sister Claudia married Octavian around 43-41 BC, but when the relations between Octavian and his mother Fulvia broke down about a year later the marriage was broken off. Fulvia died of illness in 40 BC in Greece after traveling with her children following battles with Octavians forces.

=== Career ===
Valerius Maximus regarded Publius as a lethargic nonentity who only rose to the Praetorship after 31 BC under the Second Triumvirs and died young amid scandals of luxurious excess and an obsessive attachment to a common prostitute. Besides his praetorship he was also a quaestor and a member of the priestly college of the augurs. It is possible that he survived the Battle of Actium and went over to Octavian's side after the defeat of his step-father Mark Antony, later making a further career under the emperor.

An inscription of ownership on an expensive Egyptian alabaster vase once owned by him has survived to attest to his short official career, and includes an unusual triple filiation which confirms the literary evidence to the effect that Clodius' own filiation was: Ap. f. Ap. n. Ap. pron. (son of Appius cos.79, grandson of Appius cos.143).

== Family ==
He seems to have had at least one son, possibly named Appius. The Claudius Pulcher who was triumvir monetalis in 11 BC may have been this son. The son may have been born some time in the 20s BC.

There has also been some speculation among historians such as George Patrick Goold that he might have been the father of Claudia Pulchra who was the daughter of Augustus' niece Claudia Marcella Minor. Some historians such as Ronald Syme have rejected this proposal while others like Susan Treggiari are open to the possibility. Another interpretation put forth is that Claudia Pulchra was indeed Publius's daughter, but by Claudia Marcella Major, the elder sister of Claudia Marcella Minor. Goold argues that an engagement between Publius and Marcella would have fit the political climate around 43 BC when Octavian himself was marrying Pulcher's sister Claudia. He conjectures that the future emperor might have reasoned that betrothing his niece to a son of a plebeian hero would have its advantages after his experience with the Pseudo-Marius. (Note: Pseudo-Marius was a man who attempted to pass himself off as the grandson of Gaius Marius, a man who was elected consul seven times and beloved as a hero by many citizens of Rome. Gaius Marius was also married to Julia, the aunt of Julius Caesar, and the Pseudo-Marius attempted to use his claimed relation to the recently murdered dictator to gain further support until he was killed by Caesar's general Mark Antony.)

== Cultural depictions ==
He appears as a young infant in Respublica by Richard Braccia. His possible kidnapping is also a plot point in A Murder on the Appian Way by Steven Saylor.

== See also ==
- List of kidnappings
