= Philotas (physician) =

Philotas of Amphissa (Greek: Φιλώτας) was a physician of the 1st century BC.

== Biography ==
He studied at Alexandria, and was in that city at the same time with the triumvir Mark Antony, of whose profusion and extravagance he was an eye-witness. He became acquainted with the triumvir's son Antyllus, with whom he sometimes supped, about 30 BC. On one occasion, when a certain physician had been annoying the company by his logical sophisms and forward behaviour, Philotas silenced him at last with the following syllogism: Cold water is to be given in a certain fever; but every one who has a fever has a certain fever; therefore cold water is to be given in all fevers; which so pleased Antyllus, who was at table, that he pointed to a sideboard covered with large goblets, and said: I give you all these, Philotas. As Antyllus was quite a lad at that time, Philotas scrupled to accept such a gift, but was encouraged to do so by one of the attendants, who asked him if he did not know that the giver was a son of the triumvir Antonius, and that he had full power to make such presents. He may perhaps be the same physician, of whose medical formulae one is quoted by Aulus Cornelius Celsus and Asclepiades Pharmacion, and who must have lived in or before the 1st century BC.
