= Fulvia =

Roman noblewoman (d. 40 BC)

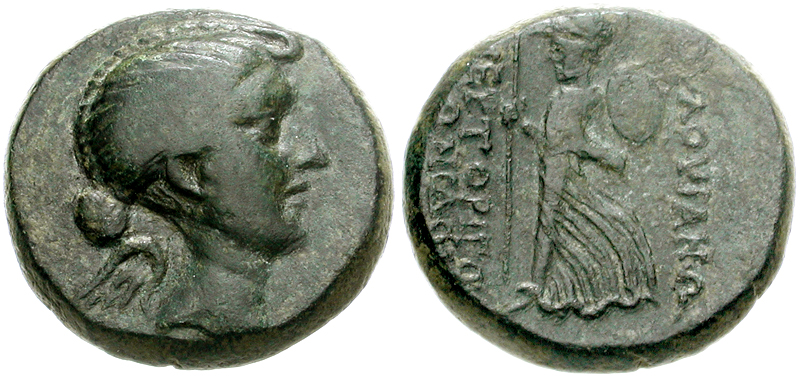
- Portrait of Fulvia on an 18 mm leaded bronze coin from the city Eumeneia (renamed Fulvia) of Phrygia. Obverse: Fulvia, reverse: Athena. Legend: ΦΟΥΛΟVΙΑΝΩΝ ΖΜΕΡΤΟΡΙΓΟΣ ΦΙΛΩΝΙΔΟΥ (Phoulovianoon Zmertorigos Philoonidou, the town magistrate). Around 41/40 BC.
- Died: 40 BC; Sicyon, Greece
- Years active: 52–40 BC
- Spouse(s): Publius Clodius Pulcher; Gaius Scribonius Curio; Mark Antony
- Children: Claudia Publius Claudius Pulcher Gaius Scribonius Curio Marcus Antonius Antyllus; Iullus Antonius
- Family: Fulvii

Fulvia (Classical Latin: [ˈfulwi.a]; d. 40 BC) was an aristocratic Roman woman who lived during the late Roman Republic. Fulvia's birth into an important political dynasty facilitated her relationships and, later on, marriages to Publius Clodius Pulcher, Gaius Scribonius Curio, and Mark Antony. All of these men would go on to lead increasingly promising political careers as populares, tribunes, and supporters of Julius Caesar.

Fulvia remains an important figure in ancient Roman history due to her perseverance as a woman heavily involved in politics, as well as her role in the Perusine War against Octavian (future emperor Augustus). She played an important political role behind the scenes of her three marriages. Though she is most famous for her involvement in Antony's career, there are scholarly debates taking place over whether Fulvia was already involved in politics before her husbands or after she married them, as a result of which she developed an increasingly public voice over time. She is most famous for her activities during her third marriage and her involvement in the Perusine War of 41–40 BC. Though not certain, she was possibly the first Roman non-mythological woman to appear on Roman coins.

== Birth and early life ==
Fulvia was born and raised either in Rome or Tusculum. Her date of birth is not known. Fulvia was a member of the Fulvia gens, which hailed from Tusculum. The Fulvii were one of the most distinguished Republican plebeian wealthy families in Rome; various members of the family achieved consulship and became senators, though no member of the Fulvii is on record as a consul after 125 BC. Fulvia was the only child of Marcus Fulvius Bambalio and Sempronia. As a result, Fulvia may have also represented the last of both the Fulvii and the Sempronii families, which meant she was likely an heiress of extreme worth and value. Her father Marcus received the nickname "Bambalio", from the Latin "to stutter", because of his hesitancy in speech. Her maternal grandfather was Sempronius Tuditanus, who was described by Cicero as a madman, who liked to throw his money to the people from the Rostra.

== Marriage to Clodius Pulcher ==
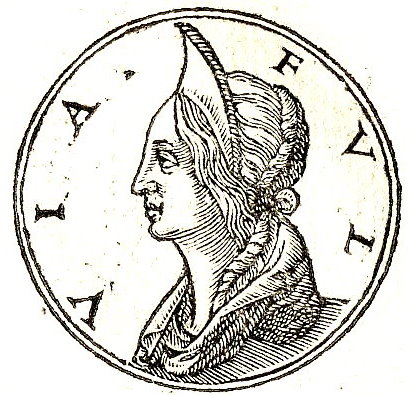
Fulvia from Promptuarii Iconum Insigniorum

Her first marriage was to Publius Clodius Pulcher, circa 62 BC. Fulvia and Clodius had two children together, a son also named Publius Clodius Pulcher and a daughter, Claudia. As a couple they went everywhere together. Claudia later married Octavian, who would later become the first Roman emperor.

In 52 BC, Clodius ran for praetor; his political competition with a consular candidate and rival, Titus Annius Milo, escalated to violence. Milo and his gang killed Clodius on January 18 on the Appian Way. Fulvia first appears in the record after his death. Fulvia and her mother Sempronia were present at the trial of Milo, and Fulvia's was the last testimony given by the prosecution. Milo was convicted and exiled.

While alive, Clodius had control of many gangs, and Fulvia retained the power and status that came with their loyalty. There is some evidence that she may have been involved in organizing the collegia. Even after Clodius' death, however, the Clodian following remained strong because of Fulvia's understanding of her political potential, and Fulvia used this strong political following to avenge his death; she and her mother brought his body to the streets of Rome so the Roman citizens would see his wounds and grow angry towards Milo. Fulvia therefore actively inserted herself into the political atmosphere that followed the death of her first husband, as a "visible symbol and reminder of his presence."

== Marriage to Scribonius Curio ==
With Pompey's seizure of power in Rome, he militarily forced out any remaining supporters of the late Clodius, including captains and tribunes; actions that prompted Fulvia to uphold her late husband's legacy alone within the city, taking advantage of every opportunity that allowed her to extend her influence and political prestige.

Her widowhood did not last long, as the customary period of mourning for Romans was ten months. Fulvia most likely married her second husband, Gaius Scribonius Curio, soon after his return from Asia and her mourning period had passed. They were married in 52-51 BC, which positioned him as the legitimate "continuator and heir of Clodius' popularis policies," though he had been an optimate. Like Clodius, Curio was very popular with the plebeians. He was from a less distinguished family than Clodius, being from a new consular family, but he may have had more wealth. He soon became important to Gaius Julius Caesar and Clodian supporters, becoming a trusted and valued political ally to these vitally important individuals because of his marriage to Fulvia and her emphasis on promoting the Clodian legacy. In 50 BC, the year after he married Fulvia, Curio won election as a tribune.

Curio died in 49 BC, killed during the Battle of the Bagradas in North Africa, fighting for Julius Caesar against King Juba I of Numidia. During the civil war, Fulvia was most likely in Rome or nearby, because Caesar's troops had taken over Italy. At the time, she would have had her two children by Clodius and was either pregnant with Curio's son or had already given birth.

== Marriage to Mark Antony ==
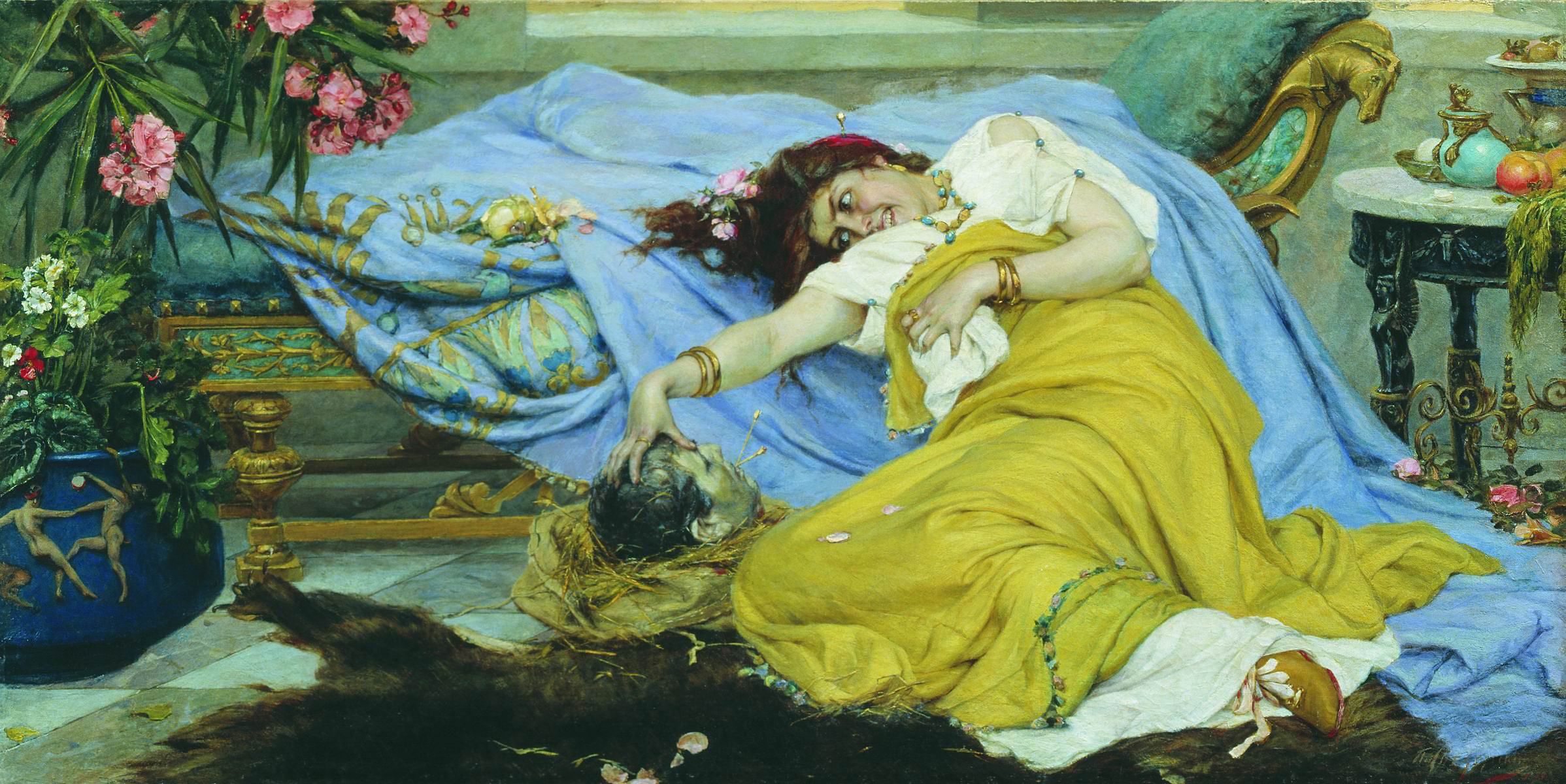
Fulvia With the Head of Cicero by Pavel Svedomsky

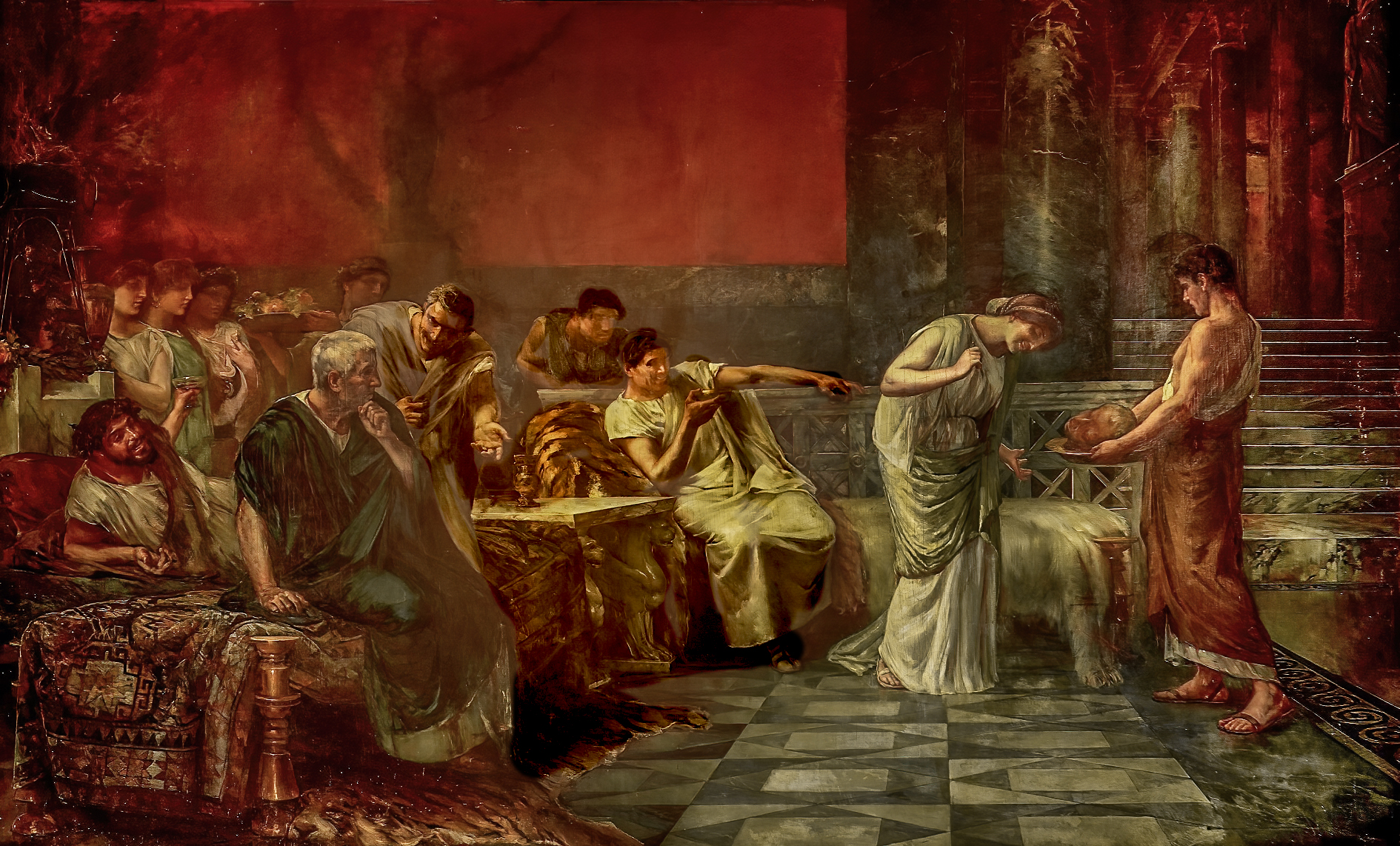
The vengeance of Fulvia by Francisco Maura Y Montaner, 1888, depicting Fulvia inspecting the severed head of Cicero

After Curio's death in Africa, the widowed Fulvia was still important in elite circles and her political interests were well known. Marriage to her would provide an important tie to Clodius and his clientela, and could offer a husband money and political organization. Also, her next husband would become the stepfather to Clodius' children, further linking him to the Clodian faction.

As it turned out, Fulvia's third and final marriage was to Mark Antony in 47 or 46 BC, a few years after Curio's death, although Cicero suggested that Fulvia and Antony had had a relationship since 58 BC. Cicero wrote about their relationship in his Philippicae as a way of attacking Antony. According to him, while Fulvia and Clodius were married, Antony once left a military post to sneak back into Rome during the night and personally deliver a love letter to Fulvia describing his love for her and saying he had stopped seeing the famous actress Cytheris. Cicero also suggested that Antony had married Fulvia for her money, though at the time of their marriage, Antony was an established politician. He had already been tribune in 49 BC, commanded armies under Caesar and was the Master of the Horse in 47 BC.

Fulvia played a very influential role in Mark Antony's political career. She was involved in his policies, such as the decision to give Sicilians Roman citizenship, as well as to confirm Deiotarus in his kingdom, and she was a very persuasive campaigner for her husband. It is also possible that former Clodian policies were continued through him. They had two sons together, Marcus Antonius Antyllus and Iullus Antonius, and throughout their marriage, Fulvia defended Antony from Cicero's attacks, sustained his popularity with his soldiers and hindered Octavian's ascension to power. Fulvia still retained the support of gangs formerly ruled by her first husband, Clodius. By publicly associating himself with Clodius' children, Antony was able to gather that support and, through Fulvia's influence, to use what was left of Clodius' gangs in his own gang wars against Dolabella and his supporters.

Some historians believe she appeared on coins minted during her husband's campaign, though others disagree. She demonstrated leadership during the Perusine War and unwavering support for Anthony. She allegedly accompanied Antony to his military camp at Brundisium in 44 BC. Appian wrote that in December 44 and again in 43 BC, while Antony was abroad and Cicero campaigned for Antony to be declared an enemy of the state, Fulvia tried to block such declarations by soliciting support for Antony.

Antony formed the Second Triumvirate with Octavian, the future emperor Augustus, and Marcus Aemilius Lepidus in 43 BC and began to conduct proscriptions. To solidify the political alliance and to advance Clodian interests, Fulvia's daughter Claudia was married to the young Octavian. Appian and Cassius Dio describe Fulvia as being involved in the violent proscriptions that were used to destroy enemies and gain badly needed funds to secure control of Rome. Antony pursued his political enemies, especially Cicero, who had openly criticized him for abusing his powers as consul after Caesar's assassination. Although many ancient sources wrote that Fulvia was happy to take revenge against Cicero for Antony's and Clodius' sake, Cassius Dio is the only one who describes the joy with which she pierced the tongue of the dead Cicero with her golden hairpins, as a final revenge against Cicero's power of speech.

=== Perusine War (41 BC to 40 BC) and Fulvia's death ===
==== Background ====
In 42 BC, Antony and Octavian left Rome to pursue Julius Caesar's assassins, Marcus Junius Brutus and Gaius Cassius Longinus. Fulvia was left behind as the most powerful woman in Rome, seeing as though she had already manifested her political aptitudes throughout the decades. According to Cassius Dio, Fulvia controlled the politics of Rome. Dio wrote that "the following year Publius Servilius and Lucius Antonius nominally became consuls, but in reality it was Antonius and Fulvia. She, the mother-in‑law of Octavian and wife of Antony, had no respect for Lepidus because of his slothfulness, and managed affairs herself, so that neither the senate nor the people transacted any business contrary to her pleasure."

Shortly afterwards, the triumvirs distributed the provinces among themselves. Lepidus took the west and Antony went to Egypt, where he met Cleopatra VII. Octavian returned to Rome in 41 BC to dispense land to Caesar's veterans, divorced Fulvia's daughter and accused Fulvia of aiming at supreme power. Fearing that Octavian was gaining the veterans' loyalty at Antony's expense, Fulvia traveled constantly with her children to the new settlements in order to remind the veterans of their debt to Antony. Fulvia also tried to delay the land settlements until Antony returned to Rome, so that the two triumvirs could share the credit. With Octavian in Italy and Antony abroad, Fulvia allied with her brother-in-law Lucius Antonius and publicly endorsed Mark Antony in opposition to Octavian.

These actions caused political and social unrest. In 41 BC, tensions between Octavian and Fulvia escalated to war in Italy: the Perusine War of 41-40 BC. According to Appian, Fulvia was a central cause of the war, due to her jealousy of Antony and Cleopatra's affair in Egypt; she may have escalated the tensions between Octavian and Lucius in order to draw back Antony's attention to Italy. However, Appian also wrote that the other main causes were the selfish ambitions of the commanders and their inability to control their own soldiers.

Together with Lucius Antonius, Fulvia raised eight legions in Italy to fight for Antony's rights against Octavian, an event known as the Perusine War. The army occupied Rome for a short time, and Lucius organized his troops at Praeneste, but eventually retreated to Perusia (modern Perugia), where Octavian besieged him. Lucius waited for Antony's legions in Gaul to come to his aid. However, unaware of the war, Antony was still in the eastern provinces, and his legions were unsure of his commands and did not assist Lucius. Although during this conflict, Fulvia was at Praeneste, there is evidence she helped Lucius. According to Appian, she "urged Ventidius, Asinius, and Calenus from Gaul to help Lucius, and having gathered another army, she sent it to Lucius under the command of Plancus."

==== Octavian's poem on Fulvia quoted by Martial ====
During the war, Octavian's soldiers at Perusia used sling bullets inscribed with insults directed at Fulvia personally and Octavian wrote a vulgar epigram directed at her in 40 BC, referring to Antony's affair with the ex-courtesan queen of Cappadocia Glaphyra. It is recorded by Martial within one of his own poems:

- Caesaris Augusti lascivos, livide, versus
sex lege, qui tristis verba Latina legis:
"Quod futuit Glaphyran Antonius, hanc mihi poenam
Fulvia constituit, se quoque uti futuam.
Fulviam ego ut futuam? Quod si me Manius oret
pedicem? faciam? Non puto, si sapiam.
'Aut futue, aut pugnemus' ait. Quid quod mihi vita
carior est ipsa mentula? Signa canant!"
Absolvis lepidos nimirum, Auguste, libellos,
qui scis Romana simplicitate loqui.

Translation:

- Spiteful censor of the Latin Language, read
six insolent verses of Caesar Augustus:
"Because Antony fucks Glaphyra, Fulvia has arranged
this punishment for me: that I fuck her too.
That I fuck Fulvia? What if Manius begged me
to bugger him? Would I? I don't think so, if I were sane.
"Either fuck or fight", she says. Doesn't she know
my prick is dearer to me than life itself? Let the trumpets blare!"
Augustus, you certainly grant my clever little books pardon,
since you are the expert at speaking with Roman frankness.

The sling bullets are very significant because they demonstrate the gender dynamics of Rome at that time. The sling- bullets are a playful metaphor, aimed at degrading and mocking Fulvia for her masculine tendencies. The bullets were shaped like a penis tips, and they share the same Latin technical term "glans.".

==== Fulvia's death ====
The siege at Perusia lasted two months before Octavian starved Lucius into surrender in February 40 BC. After Lucius' surrender, Fulvia fled to Greece with her children. Appian writes that she met Antony in Athens, and he was upset with her involvement in the war. Antony then sailed back to Rome to deal with Octavian, and Fulvia died of an unknown illness in exile in Sicyon, near Corinth, Achaea. After her death, Antony and Octavian used it as an opportunity to blame their quarrelling on her. According to Plutarch, "there was even more opportunity for a reconciliation with Caesar [i.e., Octavian]. For when Antony reached Italy, and Caesar manifestly intended to make no charges against him, and Antony himself was ready to put upon Fulvia the blame for whatever was charged against himself." After Fulvia's death, Antony married Octavian's sister, Octavia Minor, to publicly demonstrate his reconciliation with Octavian, but Antony never regained his position and influence in Italy.

Once Antony and Octavia were married, she took in and reared all of Fulvia's children. The fate of Fulvia's daughter, Clodia Pulchra, after her divorce from Octavian is unknown. Her son Marcus Antonius Antyllus was executed by Octavian in Alexandria, Egypt in 30 BC. Her youngest child, Iullus Antonius, was spared by Octavian and raised from 40 BC by Octavia Minor. Iullus married Octavia's daughter and Octavian's niece Claudia Marcella Major and they had a son Lucius Antonius and possibly a daughter Iulla Antonia.

== In fiction ==
Fulvia appears as a character in Colleen McCullough's Masters of Rome series (esp. the fourth book, Caesar's Women). While the details of her life closely match the historical Fulvia, McCullough makes her character's mother, Sempronia, the daughter of the far more famous Gaius Sempronius Gracchus rather than (the only distantly related) Sempronius Tuditanus.

Kaarina Parker's novel Fulvia likewise describes Fulvia's mother and aunt as daughters of Gaius Gracchus, despite connecting her to the Sempronii Tuditani in the Prologue. Parker claims that some historians believe that Sempronia was descended from one of the brothers Gracchi, '...historians remain divided on this topic. Because everyone in Rome shared such a limited number of names, we will likely never know if this Fulvia was descended from the Gracchi directly. But I choose to believe that she was...'

== See also ==
- Women in Rome
- List of Roman women
