= Marcus Antonius Antyllus =

Son of Roman Triumvir Marc Antony (47–30 BC)

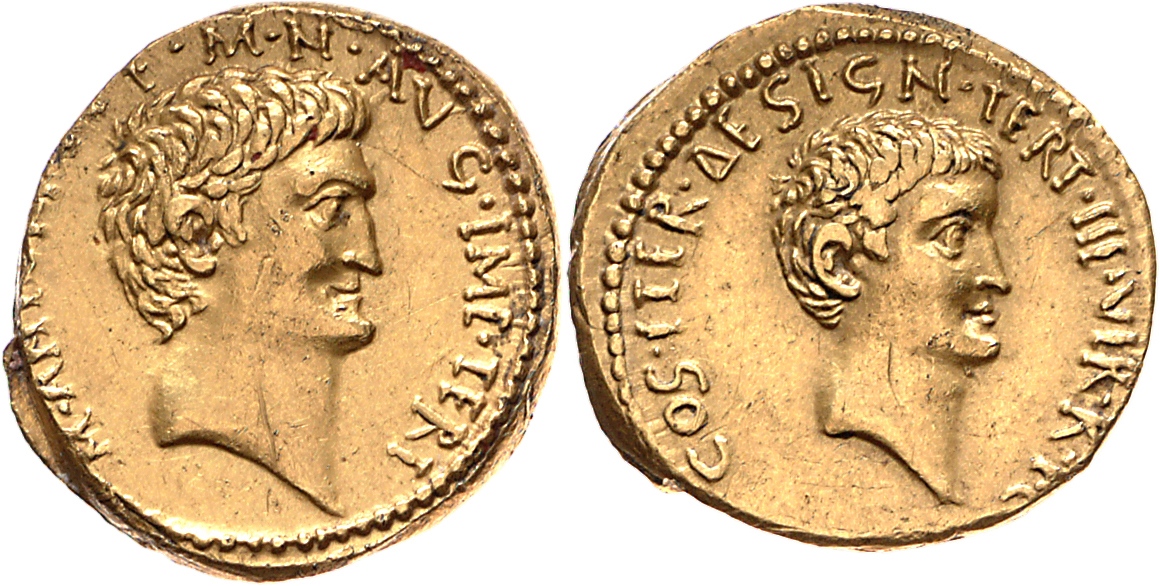
- Aureus showing Antyllus and his father
- Born: 47 BC; Rome, Italy
- Died: 23 August 30 BC (16—17 years old)
- Parent(s): Mark Antony; Fulvia
- Family: Gens Antonia

Marcus Antonius Antyllus (47 BC – 23 August 30 BC) was a son of the Roman Triumvir Marc Antony. He was also called Antyllus, a nickname given to him by his father meaning "the Archer". Despite his three children by Cleopatra, Marc Antony designated Antyllus as his official heir, a requirement under Roman law and a designation that probably contributed to his execution at age 17 by Octavian (later the Emperor Augustus).

== Name ==
His nickname Antyllus means "the archer" in Greek, but there has been some speculation among historians that this name is actually a corruption of Antonillus which means "little Antonius".

== Family ==
Antyllus was the eldest child of Mark Antony by his third wife, Fulvia, who was a great-great granddaughter of Scipio Africanus. He had one full sibling, his younger brother Iullus Antonius. His maternal half siblings were Claudia, Publius Claudius Pulcher by his mother's first husband Clodius, and another half-brother named Gaius Scribonius Curio by his mother's second husband Curio. His paternal half siblings were Antonia Prima (by Antonia Hybrida Minor), Antonia the Elder and Antonia the Younger (by Octavia Minor), and Alexander Helios, Cleopatra Selene II, and Ptolemy Philadelphus (by Cleopatra VII).

== Biography ==
Antyllus was born and raised in Rome. His mother, Fulvia, died in October 40 BC, from illness, while in political exile in Sicyon, Greece. His father remarried to Octavia Minor, the second elder sister to Octavian (future Roman Emperor Caesar Augustus) who was a member of the Second Triumvirate. In his younger years, he was betrothed to Octavian's daughter Julia the Elder. After the alliance between his father and Octavian ended, the engagement was broken off. Between 40 - 36 BC, he lived with his father, step mother and his siblings in his father's mansion, in Athens, Greece. After 36 BC, he accompanied his father as they left Greece and lived his remaining years in Alexandria, Egypt in the court of Queen Cleopatra VII of Egypt.

His physician was a Greek man called Philotas. From Plutarch's account of Antony, clause 28, the historian gives a story of the character of Antyllus:

For they had an association called The Inimitable Livers, and every day they feasted one another, making their expenditures of incredible profusion. At any rate, Philotas, the physician of Amphissa, used to tell my grandfather, Lamprias, that he was in Alexandria at the time, studying his profession, and that having got well acquainted with one of the royal cooks, he was easily persuaded by him (young man that he was) to take a view of the extravagant preparations for a royal supper. Accordingly, he was introduced into the kitchen, and when he saw all the other provisions in great abundance, and eight wild boars a-roasting, he expressed his amazement at what must be the number of guests. But the cook burst out laughing and said: "The guests are not many, only about twelve; but everything that is set before them must be at perfection, and this an instant of time reduces. For it might happen that Antony would ask for supper immediately, and after a little while, perhaps, would postpone it and call for a cup of wine, or engage in conversation with some one. Wherefore," he said, "not one, but many suppers are arranged; for the precise time is hard to hit." This tale, then, Philotas used to tell; and he said also that as time went on he became one of the medical attendants of Antony's oldest son, whom he had of Fulvia, and that he usually supped with him at his house in company with the rest of his comrades, when the young man did not sup with his father. Accordingly, on one occasion, as a physician was making too bold and giving much annoyance to them as they supped, Philotas stopped his mouth with some such sophism as the: "To the patient who is somewhat feverish cold water must be given; but everyone who has a fever is somewhat feverish; therefore to everyone who has a fever cold water should be given." The fellow was confounded and put to silence, whereat Antony's son was delighted and said with a laugh: "All this I bestow upon thee, Philotas," pointing to a table covered with a great many large beakers. Philotas acknowledged his good intentions, but was far from supposing that a boy so young had the power to give away so much. After a little while, however, one of the slaves brought the beakers to him in a sack, and bade him put his seal upon it. And when Philotas protested and was afraid to take them, "You miserable man," said the fellow, "why hesitate? Don't you know that the giver is the son of Antony, and that he has the right to bestow so many golden vessels? However, take my advice and exchange them all with us for money; since perchance the boy's father might miss some of the vessels, which are of ancient workmanship and highly valued for their art." Such details, then, my grandfather used to tell me, Philotas would recount at every opportunity.

After his victory at Battle of Actium, Octavian invaded Egypt in 30 BC. Antyllus was involved in one of three unsuccessful embassies to Octavian. His father sent him to Octavian with a large sum of money, in exchange for peace. Octavian kept the money, but dismissed Antyllus and returned him to his father. After losing further battles, Antony died by suicide and Cleopatra soon followed him. Not so long after the deaths of his father and stepmother, Antyllus' tutor Theodorus betrayed him to Octavian. Pleading in vain for mercy from Octavian, Antyllus was dragged from the image of the now deified Julius Caesar by Roman soldiers. Octavian ordered his execution on the same day as that of Caesarion. After Antyllus was beheaded, Theodorus took a precious stone that the young man had worn on a chain around his neck and sewed the stone into his belt. Although Theodorus denied the theft, Octavian tried him, found him guilty, and ordered his crucifixion.

According to Plutarch and Suetonius, Antyllus was the only child of Mark Antony to be executed by Octavian. His remaining siblings (Iullus Antonius, Alexander Helios, Cleopatra Selene II, and Ptolemy Philadelphus) were spared by Octavian and were raised by Octavia Minor (Antony's fourth wife), in Rome.

== Sources ==
- Plutarch, The Makers of Rome, Antony
- Suetonius, The Twelve Caesars, Augustus
