= Scribonius Aphrodisius =

Roman writer and literary critic

Scribonius Aphrodisius was a grammarian of ancient Rome. He was originally a slave and disciple of the grammarian Lucius Orbilius Pupillus, who was also the teacher of the Roman poet Horace. He was purchased by Scribonia, the second wife of the emperor Augustus, and was by her manumitted. She may have purchased him to educate her children, or possibly herself.

Aphrodisius is known to have written a critique on the work De Orthographia ("On Orthography") by Verrius Flaccus, also a freedman, but this work is now lost.
