= Gaius Scribonius Curio (son of Fulvia) =

Son of Fulvia, step-son of Mark Antony

- Born: c. 50 BC
- Died: 31-30 BC (aged 18-19)
- Parents: Gaius Scribonius Curio (father); Fulvia (mother)

Gaius Scribonius Curio (c. 50 BC – 31 BC/30 BC) was the son of Gaius Scribonius Curio and Fulvia.

== Biography ==
Curio was born around 50 BC to Gaius Scribonius Curio and Fulvia. From his mother he had two older half-siblings, Claudia and Publius Claudius Pulcher. When his father died in 49 BC his mother remarried to Mark Antony; from him he gained two more half siblings, Marcus Antonius Antyllus and Iullus Antonius. Curio might also have had a paternal half-brother by the same name whom might have died young, since his possible brother's full name was reused for him. Reusing names from sons who had died was common in Rome during the Republic. In 40 BC his mother Fulvia also died, meaning that he was now likely under the custody of his step-father Mark Antony who remarried to Octavia the Younger, sister of the future emperor Augustus. The remainder of his childhood was likely spent either in Rome with Octavia or with Antony on travels throughout the Roman Provinces. When the War of Actium broke out, Curio sided with his step-father Mark Antony and his next wife Cleopatra over Octavia and Augustus. He and his half brother Antyllus (as well as Cleopatra's oldest son Caesarion) were executed after the Battle of Actium. Despite his father having been a fierce supporter of Augustus' adopted father Julius Caesar he was not shown mercy like some others were. Ronald Syme speculated that the young Curio might have been unwilling to beg for mercy due to being the son of a "loyal and spirited father", and that his mother Fulvia would have been proud of that.
