= Claudia (wife of Octavian) =

1st-century BC Roman woman, briefly wife of Octavian

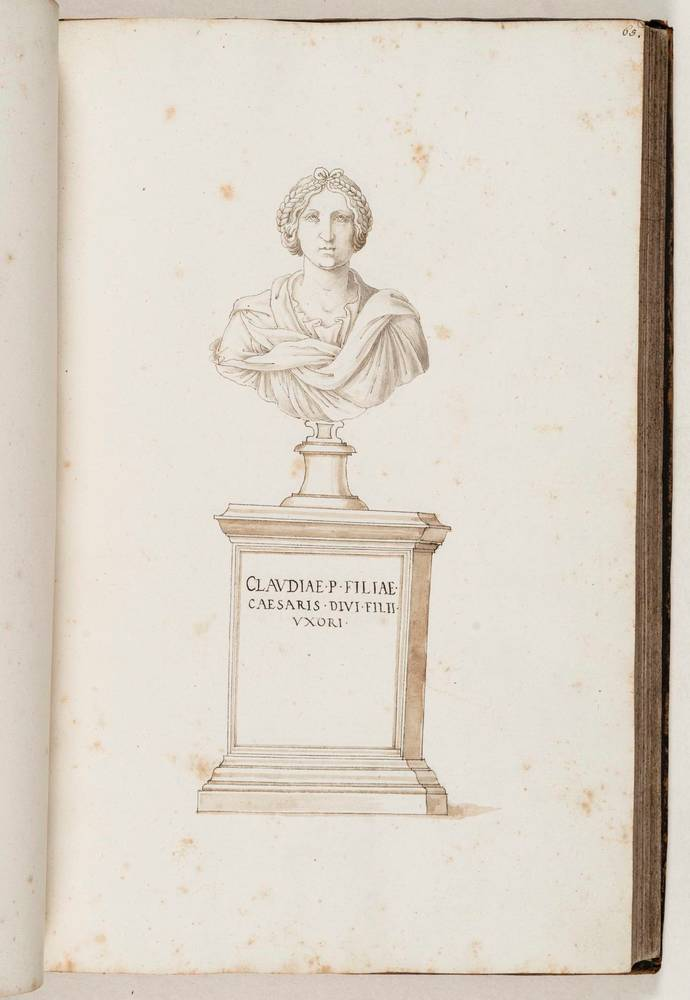
- Drawing of a portrait bust of Claudia (Jacopo Strada, c. 1570)
- Born: 57/56 BC
- Spouse(s): Octavian, later known as Augustus; Gnaeus Lartius (possibly)
- Children: Lartia (possibly)
- Parents: Publius Clodius Pulcher (father); Fulvia (mother)

Claudia (born 57 BC/56 BC) was the daughter of Fulvia by her first husband Publius Clodius Pulcher. She was the stepdaughter of Mark Antony and half-sister of his sons Marcus Antonius Antyllus and Iullus Antonius.

== Biography ==
She had one full sibling from her parents; Publius Clodius Pulcher, and three half-brothers from her mother Fulvia; Gaius Scribonius Curio, Marcus Antonius Antyllus and Iullus Antonius.

Mark Antony was her mother's third husband. As Clodius had done previously, Antony was happy to accept Fulvia's money to boost his career. Following Julius Caesar's assassination in 44 BC, Antony formed the second triumvirate with Octavian and Lepidus and embarked on a savage proscription. To solidify the political alliance, Fulvia offered Claudia to young Octavian as wife, while Lepidus offered his wife's niece Servilia (daughter of Junia Prima and Publius Servilius Isauricus). Subsequently, Octavian chose Claudia. Not much is known about their marriage and little information survives about Claudia.

These actions caused political and social unrest, but when Octavian asked for a divorce from Claudia, Fulvia herself decided to take action. Her brother-in-law Lucius Antonius raised eight legions in Italy to fight for his rights against Octavian, in what became the Perusine War. The army occupied Rome for a short time, but eventually retreated to Perusia (modern Perugia). Octavian besieged Fulvia and Lucius Antonius in the winter of 41-40 BC, starving them into surrender. Fulvia was exiled to Sicyon, where she died of a sudden illness.

Octavian divorced Claudia to marry Scribonia, with whom he would have his only child, Julia the Elder. His marriage with Claudia was never consummated and when he divorced her, he stated that she was still a virgin.

It is unknown what became of Claudia after her divorce from Octavian. A theory is that she may have married a Gnaeus Lartius and become the maternal grandmother of Publius Plautius Pulcher and his siblings Plautia Urgulanilla, Marcus Plautius Silvanus and Aulus Plautius Urgulanius.

== See also ==
- Clodia
- Women in Rome
