= Lucius Orbilius Pupillus =

1st-century BC Roman teacher and Latin grammarian

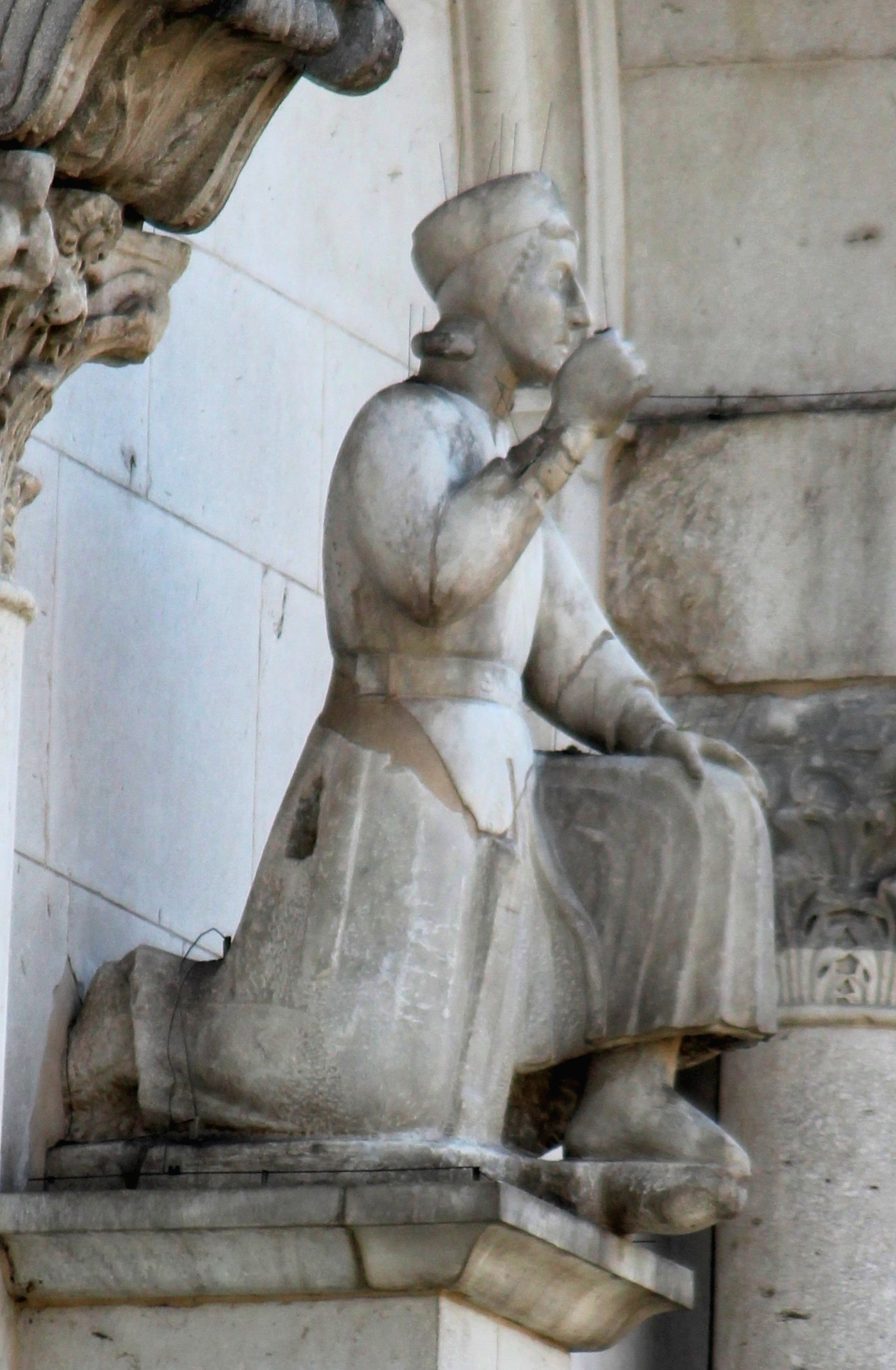
Statue at Benevento Cathedral, perhaps antique and representing Lucius Orbilius Pupillus

Lucius Orbilius Pupillus (114 BC – c. 14 BC) was a Latin grammarian of the 1st century BC, who taught at school, first at Benevento and then at Rome, where the poet Horace was one of his pupils. Horace (Epistles, ii) criticizes his old schoolmaster and describes him as plagosus (a flogger), and Orbilius has become proverbial as a disciplinarian pedagogue.

One of his slaves, Scribonius Aphrodisius, went on to become a grammarian himself, and was purchased by Scribonia, wife of the emperor Augustus.

== Bibliography ==
- Suetonius Lives of the Eminent Grammarians, chapter 4
- Smith, Dictionary of Greek and Roman Biography and Mythology, v. 3 p. 40

Media related to Lucius Orbilius Pupillus at Wikimedia Commons
