= Gaius Scribonius Curio (tribune 50 BC) =

Roman politician and general (died 49 BC)

- Born: c. 84 BC
- Died: 24 August 49 BC (aged 34/35); Medjerda River, Africa
Office
Quaestor	54 or 53 BC
Plebeian tribune (suffect)	59 BC
Propraetor (Africa)	49 BC
- Spouse: Fulvia
- Children: Gaius Scribonius Curio
- Parents: Gaius Scribonius Curio (father); Memmia (mother)
- Military career
- Allegiance: Roman Republic, Caesarian (from 49 BC)
Commands
Proquaestor (Asia)	c. 52 BC
Legate (Italy)	49 BC
Propraetor (Sicily and Africa)	49 BC

Gaius Scribonius Curio (c. 84 BC – 49 BC) was a Roman politician in the late republic. He is best known for his support of Julius Caesar prior to and during Caesar's civil war. His support, possibly secured by a massive bribe, was instrumental in the brinksmanship of the crisis in 50–49 BC that precipitated the war. In the first year of the war, he led Caesarian troops to Sicily and then to Africa, where he was killed in battle.

Prior to the civil war, Curio had operated alongside his homonymous father, the consul of 76 BC. They had supported Publius Clodius Pulcher during the Bona Dea scandal in 62 BC and opposed the alliance of Caesar, Pompey, and Crassus in 59 BC (during Caesar's first consulship). He was still aligned with prominent anti-Caesarians and the remnants of Clodius allies c. 52 BC when his father died, giving funerary games alongside Marcus Favonius and marrying Clodius' widow Fulvia. His shift towards Caesar occurred during his tribunate in 50 BC.

== Biography ==
Curio was the son of his homonymous father and his wife Memmia, born around 84 BC.

Curio and Mark Antony had a close friendship, which was denounced by their political enemies as immoral or possibly an affair. In a defamatory speech against Antony, Cicero accused Antony of being Curio's lover, claiming that after the two youths had been banned from seeing each other by Curio's father, Curio smuggled Antony in through his father's roof.

=== Opponent of Caesar ===
His first recorded political activity was, with his father, to support Publius Clodius Pulcher in the senate and the courts during the Bona Dea affair. Clodius had been accused of sacrilege; Curio's father vigorously opposed a senatorial resolution establishing a court for prosecution and the younger Curio fought the law that was correspondingly proposed in the assemblies.

He and his father became opponents of Caesar and the First Triumvirate in 59 BC. For their efforts, they were applauded in public and at the games. He was implicated in the Vettius affair – allegations, possibly masterminded by Caesar, that Curio was part of a conspiracy to assassinate Pompey – but the allegations were unbelieved and Vettius was found dead shortly thereafter.

A few years later, in 54 BC, he served as quaestor in Asia and stayed there for a few years. Around this time, his father died (he received a letter of condolence from Cicero). Upon his return to Rome in 52, he gave magnificent funeral games commemorating his father in collaboration with Marcus Favonius, an ally of Cato who was then serving as aedile. He also married Fulvia, the widow of his friend Clodius, who had been killed in a street battle with Titus Annius Milo that January. This helped his public image among Clodius supporters and gave him the support of Clodius' gangs. His and Fulvia's son Scribonius Curio was born soon after.

=== Plebeian tribunate ===
In the year 51 BC, he prepared to stand for the aedileship the following year. But after the conviction of one of the plebeian tribunes-elect in July, he took the opportunity to stand as that tribune's replacement. The same year, he was elected to the pontificate. His political position had been firmly anti-Caesarian and he was expected to support Caesar's removal from Gaul without honours, block a possible second consulship, and repeal Caesar's agrarian legislation in 59. However, Curio changed his views, possibly because he resented the senate's refusal to insert an intercalary month, or after receiving a massive bribe from Caesar. However, it did not become clear that he had become an ally of Caesar for some months; Curio continued his anti-Caesarian proposals until his tribunician proposals – including for annexation of Mauritania – were rejected by the senate.

Only in March, when the question of Caesar's command was mooted before the senate, did Curio's position become more clear when he demanded that if Caesar were to be removed in Gaul, Pompey must also be removed in Spain. Through the year, Curio vetoed any other discussion of Caesar's command. The proposal was widely praised by the general population as an acceptable compromise that would avoid civil war, giving Curio tremendous popularity, but at the same time winning Curio the enmity of Pompey. The proposal also won the approval of many senators, who viewed it as "more attractive... than the rhetoric of inflexible confrontation".

In December 50, one of the then-censors, Appius Claudius Pulcher, attempted to have him removed from the senate, a proposal which the senate rejected at Curio's urging. At a following debate on Curio's motion that both Caesar and Pompey should step down, the senate voted hugely in favour (370 to 22). This motion, however, was vetoed by the consul, who then extrajudicially called upon Pompey to raise men to fight Caesar. Upon the expiration of his tribunate on 9 December 50 (tribunes took office on 10 December rather than 1 January), he complained to the people about Pompey and consul Marcellus and promptly fled to Caesar in Ravenna.

As the year drew to a close, relations between Caesar and Pompey drew to a breaking point: a last-minute proposal brought by Curio and two of the tribunes for that year (Mark Antony and Quintus Cassius Longinus) on 1 January 49 BC was rejected and the senate – at the urging of the hardliners – voted to remove Caesar from his command (Curio and Marcus Caelius Rufus were the only dissenting votes) and moved the senatus consultum ultimum against Caesar. In response, Curio, Antony, Cassius, and Caelius fled the city to Caesar, and he then took up arms against the senate.

=== Civil war ===
Around 10 January, the civil war started when Caesar crossed the Rubicon and invaded Italy proper. The cities and communities of northern Italy quickly fell or surrendered to Caesar and he ordered the recruitment of additional soldiers. Curio was put in charge of the recruiting operation. When Caesar reached Corfinium, Curio brought twenty-two cohorts of recruits to assist in the siege.

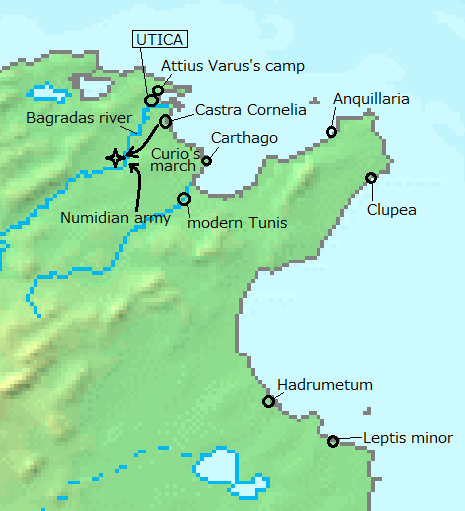
Map showing Curio's campaign in Africa, 49 BC

After Pompey's flight to Greece with about a third of the senate, Curio was put in command of three legions to take Sicily and Africa. Arriving in Sicily on 24 April 49 BC, he forced Cato from the province without bloodshed. Curio's success in Sicily also secured its grain supply and strategic position, allowing Caesar to feed the city and gain control of the central Mediterranean.

In August 49, he set sail from Lilybaeum and landed near Anquillaria on Cape Bon in Africa. There, he faced Publius Attius Varus and King Juba I of Numidia, who had sided with Pompey. Although he won a battle at Utica, he was forced to withdraw and eventually defeated by Saburra, Juba's general, at the Bagradas River where he fought to the death, along with his army, rather than attempting to flee to his camp.

== Marriages ==
By his marriage to Fulvia, the widow of Publius Clodius, he got a step-daughter, Claudia; a step-son, Publius Clodius Pulcher; and an eponymous son.

His eponymous son was later executed by Octavian after the Battle of Actium for having supported Mark Antony.

== Legacy ==
Curio built Rome's first permanent amphitheatre, in his father's memory and celebrated funeral games there with seating built on a pivot that could move the entire audience.
