= Plutarch =

Greek philosopher and historian

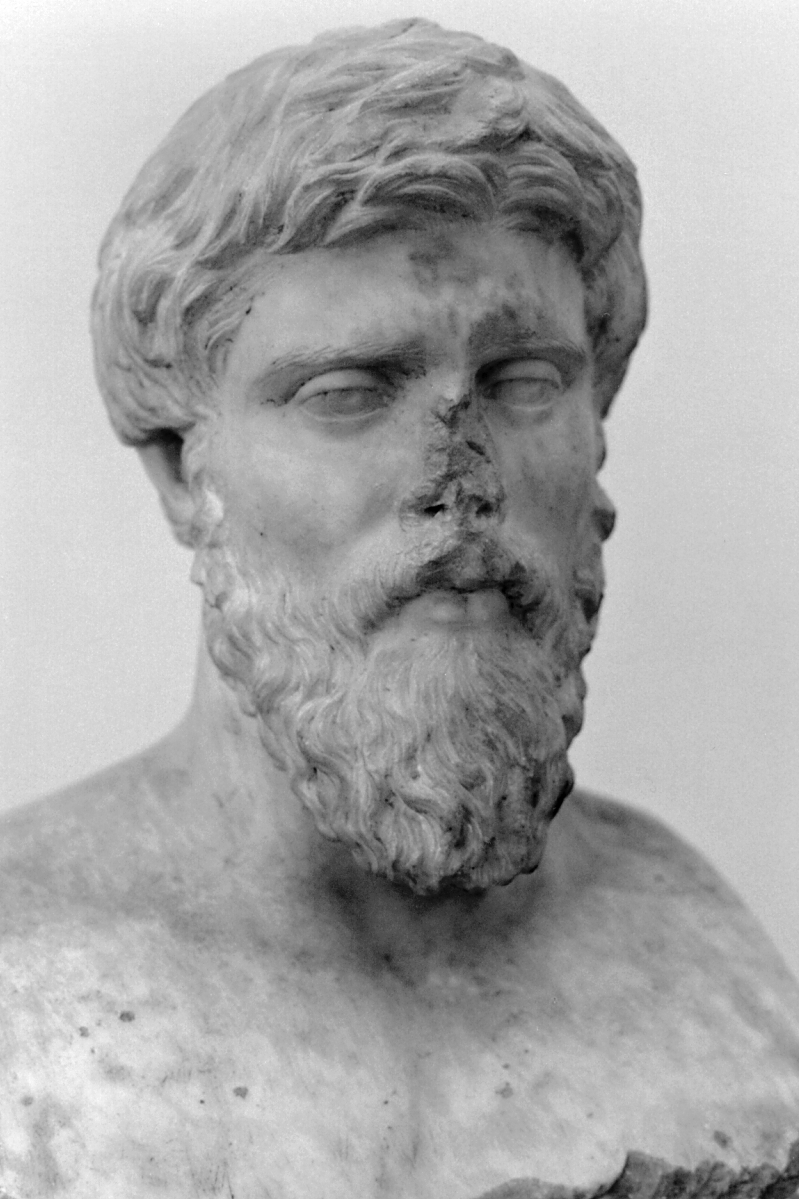
- 2nd-century bust from Delphi sometimes identified as Plutarch
- Born: before AD 50; Chaeronea, Boeotia
- Died: after AD 120; Delphi, Phocis
- Occupations: Biographer; essayist; philosopher; priest; diplomat; magistrate

Philosophical work
- Era: Ancient Roman philosophy
- Region: Ancient philosophy
- School: Middle Platonism
- Main interests: Epistemology, ethics, history, metaphysics
- Notable works: Parallel Lives; Moralia

Plutarch (/ˈpluːtɑːrk/; Ancient Greek: Πλούταρχος, Ploútarchos, Koine Greek: [ˈplúːtarkʰos]; before AD 50 – after 120) was a Greek and later Roman Middle Platonist philosopher, historian, biographer, essayist, and priest at the Temple of Apollo in Delphi. He is known primarily for his Parallel Lives, a series of biographies of illustrious Greeks and Romans, and Moralia, a collection of essays and speeches. Upon becoming a Roman citizen, he was possibly named Lucius Mestrius Plutarchus (Λούκιος Μέστριος Πλούταρχος). (Note: It was common practice for "new Romans" to adopt the name of their patrons.)

== Family ==
Plutarch was born to a prominent family in the small town of Chaeronea, about thirty kilometres (19 mi) east of Delphi, in the Greek region of Boeotia. His family was long established in the town; his father was named Autobulus and his grandfather was named Lamprias. His brothers, Timon and Lamprias, are frequently mentioned in his essays and dialogues, which speak of Timon in particular in the most affectionate terms.

== Studies and life ==
Plutarch studied mathematics and philosophy in Athens under Ammonius from AD 66 to 67. He attended the games of Delphi where the emperor Nero competed and possibly met prominent Romans, including future emperor Vespasian. At some point, Plutarch received Roman citizenship. His sponsor was Lucius Mestrius Florus, who was an associate of the new emperor Vespasian, as evidenced by his new name, Lucius Mestrius Plutarchus. As a Roman citizen, Plutarch would have been of the equestrian order. He visited Rome some time c. AD 70 with Florus, who served also as a historical source for his Life of Otho. Plutarch was on familiar terms with a number of Roman nobles, particularly the consulars Quintus Sosius Senecio, Titus Avidius Quietus, and Arulenus Rusticus, all of whom appear in his works.

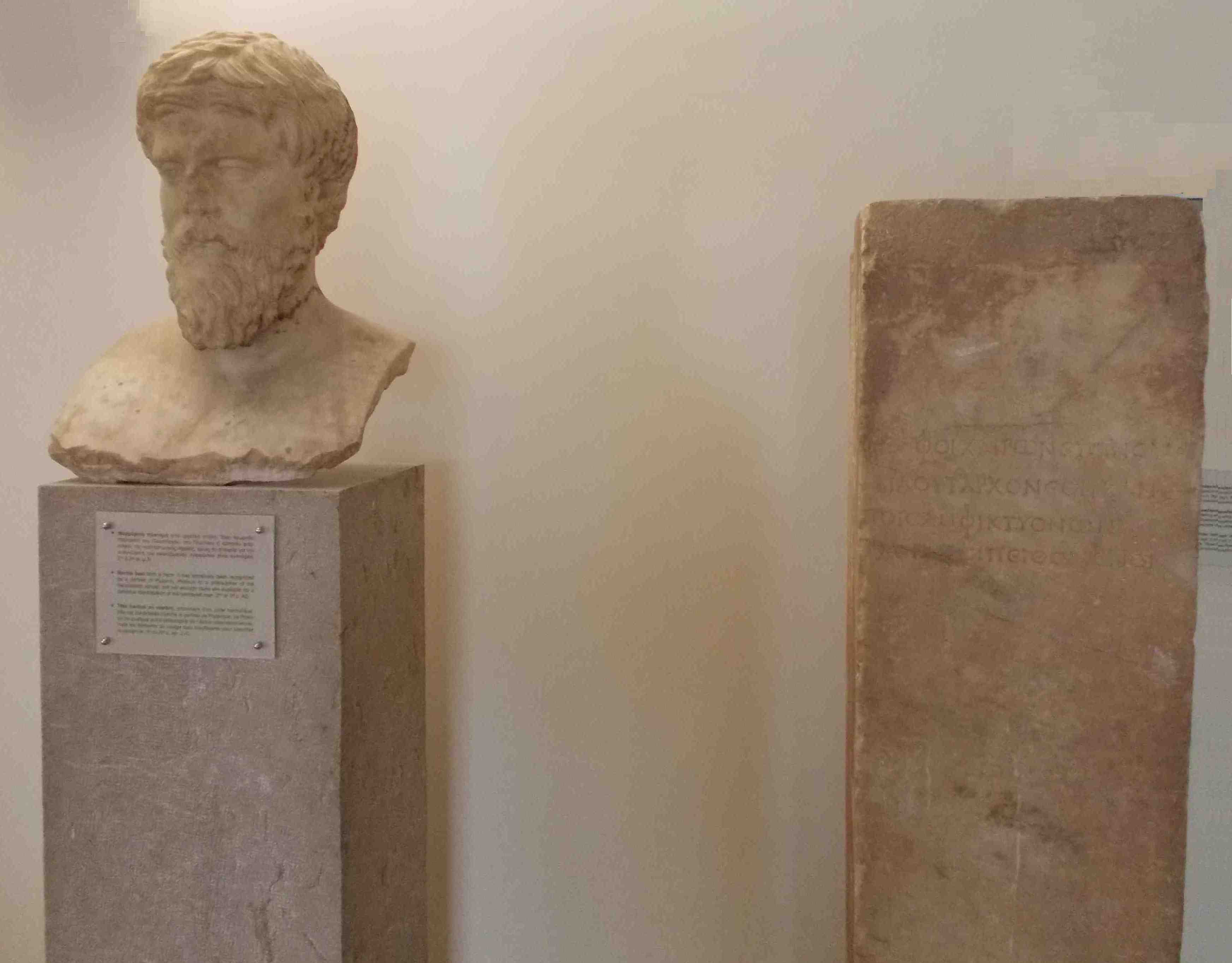
Portrait of a philosopher alongside a hermaic stele dedicated to Plutarch at the Delphi Archaeological Museum

Plutarch lived most of his life at Chaeronea, and was initiated into the mysteries of the Greek god Apollo. He probably took part in the Eleusinian Mysteries. During his visit to Rome, he may have been part of a municipal embassy for Delphi: around the same time, Vespasian granted Delphi various municipal rights and privileges. Some time c. AD 95, Plutarch was made one of the two sanctuary priests for the temple of Apollo at Delphi; the site had declined considerably since the classical Greek period. Around the same time in the 90s, Delphi experienced a construction boom, financed by Greek patrons and possible imperial support. There was a portrait bust dedicated to Plutarch for his efforts in helping to revive the Delphic shrines. The portrait of a philosopher exhibited at the exit of the Archaeological Museum of Delphi dates to the 2nd century; due to its inscription, in the past it had been identified with Plutarch. The man, although bearded, is depicted at a relatively young age: His hair and beard are rendered in coarse volumes and thin incisions. The gaze is deep, due to the heavy eyelids and the incised pupils. A fragmentary hermaic stele next to the portrait probably did once bear a portrait of Plutarch, since it is inscribed, "The Delphians, along with the Chaeroneans, dedicated this (image of) Plutarch, following the precepts of the Amphictyony" ("Δελφοὶ Χαιρωνεῦσιν ὁμοῦ Πλούταρχον ἔθηκαν | τοῖς Ἀμφικτυόνων δόγμασι πειθόμενοι").

In addition to his duties as a priest of the Delphic temple, Plutarch was also a magistrate at Chaeronea and he represented his home town on various missions to foreign countries during his early adult years. Plutarch held the office of archon in his native municipality, probably only an annual one which he likely served more than once. Plutarch was epimeletes (manager) of the Amphictyonic League for at least five terms, from 107 to 127, in which role he was responsible for organising the Pythian Games. He mentions this service in his work, Whether an Old Man Should Engage in Public Affairs (17 = Moralia 792f). According to the 8th/9th-century historian George Syncellus, late in Plutarch's life, Emperor Hadrian appointed him nominal procurator of Achaea – which entitled him to wear the vestments and ornaments of a consul.

Plutarch and his wife, Timoxena, had at least four sons and one daughter, although two died in childhood. A letter is still extant, addressed by Plutarch to his wife, bidding her not to grieve too much at the death of their two-year-old daughter, who was named Timoxena after her mother, which also mentions the loss of a young son, Chaeron. Two sons, named Autoboulos and Plutarch, appear in a number of Plutarch's works; Plutarch's treatise on Plato's Timaeus is dedicated to them. It is likely that a third son, named Soklaros after Plutarch's confidant Soklaros of Tithora, survived to adulthood as well, although he is not mentioned in Plutarch's later works; a Lucius Mestrius Soclarus, who shares Plutarch's Latin family name, appears in an inscription in Boeotia from the time of Trajan. Traditionally, the surviving catalog of Plutarch's works is ascribed to another son, named Lamprias after Plutarch's grandfather; most modern scholars believe this tradition is a later interpolation. His family remained in Greece down to at least the fourth century, producing a number of philosophers and authors. Apuleius, author of The Golden Ass, made his fictional protagonist a descendant of Plutarch.

It is not known in which year Plutarch died. Gregory Crane estimates that he died c. 125, while the 1911 edition of Encyclopædia Britannica estimates that he died c. 120. As of the 21st century, Encyclopædia Britannica gives Plutarch's death year as "after 119".

== Works ==
=== Parallel Lives ===
Plutarch's best-known work is the Parallel Lives, a series of biographies of illustrious Greeks and Romans, arranged in pairs to illuminate their common moral virtues and vices, thus it being more of an insight into human nature than a historical account. As is explained in the opening paragraph of his Life of Alexander, Plutarch was not concerned with history so much as the influence of character, good or bad, on the lives and destinies of men.

The surviving Lives contain 23 pairs, each with one Greek life and one Roman life, as well as four unpaired single lives. Some of the Lives, such as those of Heracles, Philip II of Macedon, Epaminondas, Scipio Africanus, Scipio Aemilianus and possibly Quintus Caecilius Metellus Numidicus no longer exist; many of the remaining Lives are truncated, contain obvious lacunae or have been tampered with by later writers.

Extant Lives include those on Solon, Themistocles, Aristides, Agesilaus II, Pericles, Alcibiades, Nicias, Demosthenes, Pelopidas, Philopoemen, Timoleon, Dion of Syracuse, Eumenes, Alexander the Great, Pyrrhus of Epirus, Romulus, Numa Pompilius, Coriolanus, Theseus, Aemilius Paullus, Tiberius Gracchus, Gaius Gracchus, Gaius Marius, Sulla, Sertorius, Lucullus, Pompey, Julius Caesar, Cicero, Cato the Elder, Cato the Younger, Mark Antony, and Marcus Junius Brutus.

==== Life of Alexander ====
"It is not histories I am writing, but lives; and in the most glorious deeds there is not always an indication of virtue or vice, indeed a small thing like a phrase or a jest often makes a greater revelation of a character than battles where thousands die."

— Life of Alexander

Plutarch's Life of Alexander, written as a parallel to that of Julius Caesar, is one of five extant tertiary sources on the Macedonian conqueror Alexander the Great. It includes anecdotes and descriptions of events that appear in no other source, just as Plutarch's portrait of Numa Pompilius, the putative second king of Rome, holds much that is unique on the early Roman calendar. Plutarch devotes a great deal of space to Alexander's drive and desire, and strives to determine how much of it was presaged in his youth. He also draws extensively on the work of Lysippos, Alexander's favourite sculptor, to provide what is probably the fullest and most accurate description of the conqueror's physical appearance. When it comes to his character, Plutarch emphasizes his unusual degree of self-control and scorn for luxury: "He desired not pleasure or wealth, but only excellence and glory." As the narrative progresses, the subject incurs less admiration from his biographer and the deeds that it recounts become less savoury. The murder of Cleitus the Black, which Alexander instantly and deeply regretted, is commonly cited to this end.

==== Life of Caesar ====
Together with Suetonius's The Twelve Caesars, and Caesar's own works de Bello Gallico and de Bello Civili, the Life of Caesar is the main account of Julius Caesar's feats by ancient historians. Plutarch starts by telling of the audacity of Caesar and his refusal to dismiss Cinna's daughter, Cornelia. Other important parts are those containing his military deeds, accounts of battles and Caesar's capacity of inspiring the soldiers.

Plutarch's life shows few differences from Suetonius' work and Caesar's own works (see De Bello Gallico and De Bello Civili). Sometimes, Plutarch quotes directly from the De Bello Gallico and even tells us of the moments when Caesar was dictating his works. In the final part of this life, Plutarch recounts details of Caesar's assassination. It ends by telling the destiny of his murderers, just after a detailed account of the scene when a phantom appeared to Brutus at night.

==== Life of Pyrrhus ====
Plutarch's Life of Pyrrhus is a key text because it is the main historical account on Roman history for the period from 293 to 264 BCE, for which both Dionysius' and Livy's texts are lost.

=== Moralia ===
The remainder of Plutarch's surviving work is collected under the title of the Moralia (loosely translated as Customs and Mores). It is an eclectic collection of seventy-eight essays and transcribed speeches, including "Concerning the Face Which Appears in the Orb of the Moon" (a dialogue on the possible causes for such an appearance and a source for Galileo's own work), "On Fraternal Affection" (a discourse on honour and affection of siblings toward each other), "On the Fortune or the Virtue of Alexander the Great" (an important adjunct to his Life of the great king), and "On the Worship of Isis and Osiris" (a crucial source of information on ancient Egyptian religion); more philosophical treatises, such as "On the Decline of the Oracles", "On the Delays of the Divine Vengeance", and "On Peace of Mind"; and lighter fare, such as "Odysseus and Gryllus", a humorous dialogue between Homer's Odysseus and one of Circe's enchanted pigs.

==== Pseudepigrapha ====
Some editions of the Moralia include several works now known to have been falsely attributed to Plutarch. Among these are the Lives of the Ten Orators, a series of biographies of the Attic orators based on Caecilius of Calacte; On the Opinions of the Philosophers, On Fate, and On Music. These works are all attributed to a single, unknown author, referred to as "Pseudo-Plutarch". Pseudo-Plutarch lived sometime between the third and fourth centuries AD. Despite being falsely attributed, the works are still considered to possess historical value.

=== Lives of the Roman emperors ===
Plutarch's first biographical works were the Lives of the Roman Emperors from Augustus to Vitellius. These early emperors' biographies were probably published under the Flavian dynasty or during the reign of Nerva (AD 96–98). Of these, only the Lives of Galba and Otho survive. The Lives of Tiberius and Nero are extant only as fragments, provided by Damascius as well as Plutarch himself, respectively.

=== Lost works ===
The lost works of Plutarch are determined by references in his own texts to them and from other authors' references over time. Parts of the Lives and what would be considered parts of the Moralia have been lost. The 'Catalogue of Lamprias', an ancient list of works attributed to Plutarch, lists 227 works, of which 78 have come down to us. The Romans loved the Lives. Enough copies were written out over the centuries so that a copy of most of the lives has survived to the present day, but there are traces of twelve more Lives that are now lost. Plutarch's general procedure for the Lives was to write the life of a prominent Greek, then cast about for a suitable Roman parallel, and end with a brief comparison of the Greek and Roman lives. Currently, only 19 of the parallel lives end with a comparison, while possibly they all did at one time. Also missing are many of his Lives which appear in a list of his writings: those of Hercules, the first pair of Parallel Lives, Scipio Africanus and Epaminondas, and the companions to the four solo biographies, as well as biographies of important figures such as Augustus, Claudius and Nero. Lost works that would have been part of the Moralia include "Whether One Who Suspends Judgment on Everything Is Condemned to Inaction", "On Pyrrho's Ten Modes", and "On the Difference between the Pyrrhonians and the Academics".

== Philosophy ==
"The soul, being eternal, after death is like a caged bird that has been released. If it has been a long time in the body, and has become tame by many affairs and long habit, the soul will immediately take another body and once again become involved in the troubles of the world. The worst thing about old age is that the soul's memory of the other world grows dim, while at the same time its attachment to things of this world becomes so strong that the soul tends to retain the form that it had in the body. But that soul which remains only a short time within a body, until liberated by the higher powers, quickly recovers its fire and goes on to higher things."

— Plutarch ("The Consolation", Moralia)

Plutarch was a Platonist, but was open to the influence of the Peripatetics, and in some details even to Stoicism despite his criticism of their principles. He rejected only Epicureanism absolutely. He attached little importance to theoretical questions and doubted the possibility of ever solving them. He was more interested in moral and religious questions.

In opposition to Stoic materialism and Epicurean atheism he cherished a pure idea of God that was more in accordance with Plato. He adopted a second principle (Dyad) in order to explain the phenomenal world. This principle he sought, however, not in any indeterminate matter but in the evil world-soul which has from the beginning been bound up with matter, but in the creation was filled with reason and arranged by it. Thus it was transformed into the divine soul of the world, but continued to operate as the source of all evil. He elevated God above the finite world, and thus daemons became for him agents of God's influence on the world. He strongly defends freedom of the will, and the immortality of the soul.

Platonic-Peripatetic ethics were upheld by Plutarch against the opposing theories of the Stoics and Epicureans. The most characteristic feature of Plutarch's ethics is its close connection with religion. However pure Plutarch's idea of God is, and however vivid his description of the vice and corruption which superstition causes, his warm religious feelings and his distrust of human powers of knowledge led him to believe that God comes to our aid by direct revelations, which we perceive the more clearly the more completely that we refrain in "enthusiasm" from all action; this made it possible for him to justify popular belief in divination in the way which had long been usual among the Stoics.

His attitude to popular religion was similar. The gods of different peoples are merely different names for one and the same divine Being and the powers that serve it. The myths contain philosophical truths which can be interpreted allegorically. Thus, Plutarch sought to combine the philosophical and religious conception of things and to remain as close as possible to tradition. Plutarch was the teacher of Favorinus.

Plutarch was a vegetarian, although how long and how strictly he adhered to this diet is unclear. He wrote about the ethics of meat-eating in two discourses in Moralia.

== Influence ==
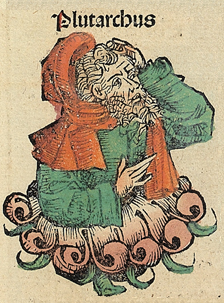
Plutarch in the Nuremberg Chronicle

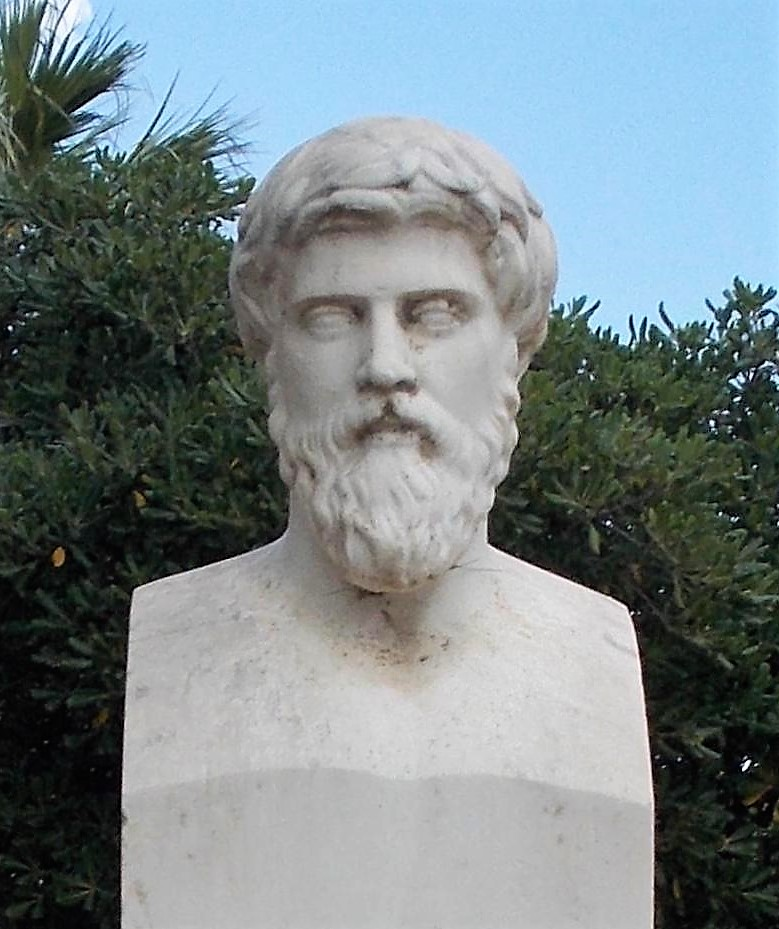
Modern portrait at Chaeronea, based on the bust from Delphi

There are multiple translations of Parallel Lives into Latin, most notably the one titled "Pour le Dauphin" (French for "for the Crown Prince") written by a scribe in the court of Louis XV of France, and a 1470 Ulrich Han translation. In 1519, Hieronymus Emser translated De capienda ex inimicis utilitate (wie ym eyner seinen veyndt nutz machen kan, Leipzig). The biographies were translated by Gottlob Benedict von Schirach (1743–1804) and printed in Vienna by Franz Haas (1776–1780). Plutarch's Lives and Moralia were translated into German by Johann Friedrich Salomon Kaltwasser.

=== France and England ===
Plutarch's writings had an enormous influence on English and French literature.

Montaigne's Essays draw extensively on Plutarch's Moralia and are consciously modelled on the Greek's easygoing and discursive inquiries into science, manners, customs and beliefs. Essays contains more than 400 references to Plutarch and his works.

Jacques Amyot's translations brought Plutarch's works to French readers. He went to Italy and studied the Vatican text of Plutarch, from which he published a French translation of the Lives in 1559 and Moralia in 1572, which were widely read by educated Europe. Amyot's translations had as deep an impression in England as France, because Sir Thomas North later published his English translation of the Lives in 1579 based on Amyot's French translation instead of the original Greek. Shakespeare paraphrased parts of Thomas North's translation of selected Lives in his plays, and occasionally quoted from them verbatim.

The complete Moralia was first translated into English from the original Greek by Philemon Holland in 1603. In 1683, John Dryden began a life of Plutarch and oversaw a translation of the Lives by several hands and based on the original Greek. This translation has been reworked and revised several times, most recently in the 19th century by the English poet and classicist Arthur Hugh Clough (first published in 1859). In 1770, English brothers John and William Langhorne published "Plutarch's Lives from the original Greek, with notes critical and historical, and a new life of Plutarch" in 6 volumes and dedicated to Lord Folkestone. Their translation was re-edited by Archdeacon Wrangham in the year 1813.

Jean-Jacques Rousseau quotes Plutarch in the 1762 Emile, or On Education, a treatise on the education of the whole person for citizenship. Rousseau introduces a passage from Plutarch in support of his position against eating meat: "'You ask me', said Plutarch, 'why Pythagoras abstained from eating the flesh of beasts...'"

James Boswell quoted Plutarch on writing lives, rather than biographies, in the introduction to his own Life of Samuel Johnson.

=== America ===
Plutarch is the most frequently named of the ancient historians in the Federalist Papers. Ralph Waldo Emerson and the transcendentalists were greatly influenced by the Moralia and in his glowing introduction to the five-volume, 19th-century edition, he called the Lives "a bible for heroes".

== See also ==
- 6615 Plutarchos
- Plutarchia (wasp)
- Plutarchia (plant)

== Bibliography ==
- Dillon, J.M. (1996). The Middle Platonists: 80 B.C. to A.D. 220. Ithaca, NY: Cornell University Press. ISBN 978-0-8014-8316-5.
- Honigmann, E.A.J. (1959). "Shakespeare's Plutarch". Shakespeare Quarterly. 10 (1): 25–33. doi:10.2307/2867020. JSTOR 2867020.
- Jones, C.P. (1971). Plutarch and Rome. Oxford, UK: Oxford University Press. ISBN 978-0-19-814363-5.
- Russell, D.A. (2001) [1972]. Plutarch. Duckworth Publishing. ISBN 978-1-85399-620-7.
- Russell, Donald (2012). "Plutarch". In Hornblower, Simon; Spawforth, Antony; Eidinow, Esther (eds.). The Oxford Classical Dictionary (4th ed.). Oxford, UK: Oxford University Press. pp. 1165–1166. doi:10.1093/acrefore/9780199381135.013.5141. ISBN 978-0-19-954556-8. OCLC 959667246.
- Stadter, Philip A. (2014). "Plutarch and Rome". In Beck, Mark (ed.). A Companion to Plutarch. Blackwell Companions to the Ancient World. Wiley Blackwell. pp. 13–31. ISBN 978-1-4051-9431-0. LCCN 2013028283.
- Zeller, Eduard (1931). Outlines of the History of Greek Philosophy: 13th Edition, Revised by Wilhelm Nestle. K. Paul, Trench, Trubner. pp. 306–308.
