= Rubellia Bassa =

Daughter of Roman consul Gaius Rubellius Blandus

Rubellia Bassa (probably born between AD 33 and 38) was a daughter of Gaius Rubellius Blandus, consul in AD 18, presumably by his wife Julia Livia.

== Imperial ancestry ==
It has been concluded by Ronald Syme, among others, that Bassa's mother was Julia Livia, the daughter of Drusus Julius Caesar and Livilla, making her the great-granddaughter of Tiberius and the great-grandniece of Augustus through his sister, Octavia the Younger. However, because Gaius Rubellius Blandus was an older man—perhaps born around 25 BC—when he married Julia in AD 33, the existence of a previous, though undocumented wife remains likely. According to Syme, the motivation for the imperial marriage was Tiberius' wish for a mature groom with little political ambition, who posed no threat to his designated heir, Julia's younger brother Tiberius Gemellus.

The cognomen Bassa may be explained by an earlier connection between the Rubellii and another Tiburtine family, the Caesii Bassi. Indeed, in AD 29 a relative of Blandus, Rubellius Geminus, is thought to have adopted the short-lived Lucius Rubellius Geminus Caesianus, probably the son of a Titus Caesius, and a nephew of Geminus' wife.

Bassa had at least one sibling that lived to adulthood, a brother named Rubellius Plautus, who as one of the nearest relatives of Tiberius, was considered a potential rival to Nero. Plautus was forced to kill himself in AD 62. Four years later his widow, Antistia Pollitta, and her father, Lucius Antistius Vetus, committed suicide upon hearing of Vetus' impending condemnation by the Senate. The names and fate of their children is unknown, but it is assumed that they did not survive the purge of AD 66. Other potential siblings include a Rubellius Blandus mentioned by Juvenal, and Rubellius Drusus, a child who died before the age of three. Edmund Groag maintains that the former was a historical figure; whereas Syme suggests that he may either be a literary rendering of Plautus, or an obscure suffect consul, attested with Gaius Annius Pollio. Alternatively, Syme speculates that the consul may be a son of Blandus by a previous wife.

At Rome, a fistula aquaria, or lead water pipe, bearing the name of Rubellia Bassa was found in the Via dei Cerchi between the Palatine and the Circus Maximus. The associated town house belonging to her will have been located nearby. Since the letter forms of the pipe allow its manufacture to be dated to the beginning of the second century, Bassa may have reached an advanced age. This supports the likelihood that her birth occurred within the years of Blandus' marriage to Julia. The possibility that she was instead a granddaughter of Blandus has also been raised, although Groag dismisses it on account of chronological inconsistencies. He discussed the timing of Rubellia's birth, and concluded that she was almost certainly Julia's daughter. His analysis has been followed by later scholars, including Ronald Syme.

Another lead pipe unearthed in Rome bears the name of Sergius Rubellius Plautus, and predates that of Rubellia Bassa. This Plautus has been tentatively identified with Bassa's brother. Syme notes that the gentilicium Sergius, inherited through a cognatic line, is mirrored in the praenomen later borne by Bassa's grandson, Sergius Octavius Laenas Pontianus.

== Marriage and descendants ==
Rubellia Bassa married Octavius Laenas, the son of Gaius Octavius Laenas, suffect consul in AD 33. Her father-in-law was the maternal grandfather of the future emperor Nerva, as well as her father's maternal first cousin via the gens Sergia. Bassa and her husband had at least one child, a son who was the father of Sergius Octavius Laenas Pontianus, consul under Hadrian in AD 131. He set up a monument dedicated to his grandmother, "[Rub]elliae / [Bla]ndi f(iliae) Bassae / Octavi Laenatis / Sergius Octavius / Laenas Pontianus / aviae optimae ". This obscure link is perhaps a continuation of the Julio-Claudian bloodline through the second century.

== See also ==
- List of Roman women
