= Rubellia gens =

Ancient Roman family

The gens Rubellia was a minor plebeian family at ancient Rome. Members of this gens are first mentioned in the time of Augustus, and they achieved prominence during the first century, when two of them obtained the consulship: Gaius Rubellius Blandus in AD 18, and Lucius Rubellius Geminus in AD 29.

== Origin ==
The first of the Rubellii mentioned in history was a native of Tibur in Latium. Originally a Sabine town, Tibur became part of Roman territory at the end of the Latin War in 338 BC, and its inhabitants gained full Roman citizenship during the Social War. The nomen Rubellius belongs to a class of gentilicia formed using the diminutive suffix -ellius, typically derived from other gentile names. In this case the root may have been a name such as Rubius, Rubrius, or Rufius, derived from ruber, reddish or ruddy, or rufus, red.

== Praenomina ==
The chief praenomina of the Rubellii were Gaius and Lucius, the two most common names throughout Roman history. Titus, also a very common name, appears in a filiation.

== Branches and cognomina ==
The main family of the Rubellii bore the surname Blandus, charming or flattering. One member of this family was known as Plautus, a common surname originally given to someone with flat or splayed feet. There also seems to have been a family bearing the surname Geminus, a twin, perhaps a cadet branch of the Blandi.

== Members ==
This list includes abbreviated praenomina. For an explanation of this practice, see filiation.

- Rubellius Blandus, an eques who taught oratory at Rome during the Augustan era. The elder Seneca described him as the tutor of the rhetorician Papirius Fabianus, and frequently employed Blandus as one of the speakers in his Controversiae and Suasoriae. He was probably the father or grandfather of Gaius Rubellius Blandus, consul in AD 18.
- Gaius Rubellius Blandus, triumvir monetalis in an uncertain year, probably the son of the rhetorician Rubellius Blandus, and the father Gaius Rubellius Blandus, the consul of AD 18.
- Gaius Rubellius C. f. Blandus, consul suffectus from the Kalends of August in AD 18, married Julia, the granddaughter of Tiberius, in AD 33. Although their marriage produced several children, Tacitus describes it as a disastrous union, which added to Rome's sorrows at a period of considerable turmoil.
- Lucius Rubellius Geminus, consul in AD 29.
- Gaius Rubellius L. f. Blandus, a proconsul mentioned in an inscription from Cyrene; probably the same Gaius Rubellius Blandus mentioned in an inscription from Marruvium.
- Rubellia C. f. C. n. Bassa, daughter of Gaius Rubellius Blandus, married Octavius Laenas, an uncle of Nerva.
- Gaius Rubellius C. f. C. n. Blandus, perhaps the eldest son of Gaius Rubellius Blandus and Julia, is known only from a passing mention by Juvenal, who may have been referring to Gaius Rubellius Plautus.
- Rubellius C. f. C. n. Drusus, a son of Gaius Rubellius Blandus and Julia, died in childhood.
- Rubellius C. f. C. n. Plautus, the son of Gaius Rubellius Blandus and Julia, married Antistia, the daughter of Lucius Antistius Vetus, consul in AD 55. Although he seems not to have become involved in politics, he was the subject of various rumours concerning plots against Nero, who sent him into exile in Asia, where the emperor had him put to death in 62.
- Rubellia Blanda, buried at Thubursicum in Africa Proconsularis, aged seventy-five.
- Lucius Rubellius T. f. Geminus Caesianus, buried at Rome, aged thirteen years, five months.

== See also ==
- List of Roman gentes

== Bibliography ==
- Lucius Annaeus Seneca (Seneca the Elder), Controversiae (Controversies), Suasoriae (Rhetorical Exercises).
- Decimus Junius Juvenalis, Satirae (Satires).
- Publius Cornelius Tacitus, Annales.
- Lucius Cassius Dio Cocceianus (Cassius Dio), Roman History.
- Joseph Hilarius Eckhel, Doctrina Numorum Veterum (The Study of Ancient Coins, 1792–1798).
- Dictionary of Greek and Roman Biography and Mythology, William Smith, ed., Little, Brown and Company, Boston (1849).
- Theodor Mommsen et alii, Corpus Inscriptionum Latinarum (The Body of Latin Inscriptions, abbreviated CIL), Berlin-Brandenburgische Akademie der Wissenschaften (1853–present).
- René Cagnat et alii, L'Année épigraphique (The Year in Epigraphy, abbreviated AE), Presses Universitaires de France (1888–present).
- George Davis Chase, "The Origin of Roman Praenomina", in Harvard Studies in Classical Philology, vol. VIII, pp. 103–184 (1897).
- Stéphane Gsell, Inscriptions Latines de L'Algérie (Latin Inscriptions from Algeria, abbreviated ILAlg), Edouard Champion, Paris (1922–present).
