= Rubellius Plautus =

Roman noble and political rival of Emperor Nero (AD 33–62)

Rubellius Plautus (Note: Possibly named Gaius or Sergius.) (33–62 AD) was a Roman noble and a political rival of Emperor Nero. Through his mother Julia Livia, he was a member of the Julio-Claudian dynasty. Julia was the daughter of Drusus Julius Caesar, son of emperor Tiberius.

== Parentage ==
Plautus' father was Gaius Rubellius Blandus. Blandus' family originated from Tibur (modern Tivoli) and were of the Equestrian class. His mother Julia Livia was the daughter of Drusus, son of emperor Tiberius. Through his mother he was also descended from Livilla, Vipsania Agrippina, Nero Claudius Drusus, Antonia Minor, Marcus Vipsanius Agrippa, Mark Antony, and Octavia the Younger.

Plautus derived his cognomen from his father's maternal grandfather Lucius Sergius Plautus, and may have used his ancestor's nomen gentilicium Sergius as his own praenomen as a lead pipe is attested with the name "Sergius Rubellius Plautus", but this person may have been his son.

Plautus father died in 38. Between 43 and 45, his mother Julia became an innocent victim to the intrigues of Empress Valeria Messalina. One possibility is that the young Plautus was seen by Messalina as a rival to her son Britannicus. Emperor Claudius (who was husband to Messalina, father to Brittanicus and maternal uncle to Julia) did not secure any legal defense for his niece. Consequently, Julia was executed. However Julia was considered to be a virtuous person by those who knew her.

== Marriage ==
Plautus married Antistia Pollitta, daughter to Lucius Antistius Vetus. His father-in-law served as Consul in 55, Legatus of Germania Superior in 55–56, and Proconsul of Asia in 64–65. Plautus was considered a loving husband and father. The names of his children, however, were not recorded.

== Philosophy ==
Plautus appears to have been a follower of Stoicism. According to Tacitus, Tigellinus wrote to Nero: "Plautus again, with his great wealth, does not so much as affect a love of repose, but he flaunts before us his imitations of the old Romans, and assumes the self-consciousness of the Stoics along with a philosophy, which makes men restless, and eager for a busy life." When he was exiled from Rome by Nero, Plautus was accompanied by the famous Stoic teacher Musonius Rufus. He was associated with a group of Stoics who criticized the perceived tyranny and autocratic rule of certain emperors, referred to today as the Stoic Opposition.

== Nero's jealousy ==
In 55, Junia Silana, sister of Caligula's first wife Junia Claudilla, a rival of Empress Agrippina the Younger and the ex-wife of Messalina's lover Gaius Silius, accused Agrippina of plotting to overthrow Nero to place Plautus on the throne. Nero took no action at the time, but over time, Nero's relationship with Silana warmed while his relationship with his mother soured. After a comet appeared in 60, public gossip renewed rumors of Nero's fall and Plautus' rise. Nero exiled Plautus in 60 to his estate in Asia with his family.

In 62, after rumors that Plautus was in negotiations with the eastern general Gnaeus Domitius Corbulo over rebellion, Plautus was executed by Nero. When his head was given to Nero by a freedman, Nero mocked how frightening the long nose of Plautus was.

In 66, his widow and father-in-law committed suicide upon hearing of their impending judgement the Senate. The fate of his children is unknown but it is assumed that they did not survive this. Tacitus states Plautus was old fashioned in tastes, his bearing austere and he lived a secluded life. He was greatly respected by his peers, and the demise of his family was cause for consternation among those who knew him.

== Ancestry ==
Ancestors of Rubellius Plautus

8.Lucius Rubellius Blandus
4. Gaius Rubellius Blandus
2. Gaius Rubellius Blandus
10. Lucius Sergius Plautus
5. Sergia Plautilla
1. Rubellius Plautus
12. Tiberius Caesar Augustus
6. Drusus Julius Caesar
13. Vipsania Agrippina
3. Julia Livia
14. Nero Claudius Drusus
7. Livilla
15. Antonia the Younger
