= Gaius Rubellius Blandus =

1st century AD Roman politician and senator

Gaius Rubellius Blandus was a Roman senator who lived during the Principate. Blandus was the grandson of Lucius Rubellius Blandus of Tibur, a member of the Equestrian class, who was the first Roman to teach rhetoric. He was suffect consul from August to December AD 18 with Marcus Vipstanus Gallus as his colleague. In AD 33, he married Julia Livia, granddaughter of the Roman emperor Tiberius. Blandus appears to have died in AD 38.

== Career ==
As the first member of his family to be admitted to the Senate, Blandus is considered a homo novus. His cursus honorum is documented in several inscriptions found in North Africa. Blandus began his career with the singular honor of being quaestor in service to the emperor Augustus; two more of the traditional Republican magistracies followed, plebeian tribune and praetor. Two years after he served as suffect consul, he was involved with the prosecution of Aemilia Lepida, putting forward a motion in the senate to outlaw her which carried.

The primary sources disagree when Blandus was admitted to the prestigious College of Pontiffs, whether it was before or after his consulate; one inscription lists it before, while two list it afterwards. Hoffman notes Blandus "probably received the priesthood late because of his low birth." Despite his background, Blandus achieved what came to be the pinnacle of a successful senatorial career, proconsular governor of Africa in 35/36. Upon returning to Rome, Blandus was selected as one of four members of a commission to assess damage a fire had caused in Rome earlier that year.

== Family connections ==
Blandus was the son of another, rather obscure Gaius Rubellius Blandus, proconsul of Crete and Cyrene. His mother, Sergia, was the daughter of the patrician Lucius Sergius Plautus, and a maternal aunt of Gaius Octavius Laenas, the grandfather of the future emperor Nerva.

In the year 33, Blandus married Julia Livia, one of the princesses of the Imperial house. Despite the fact that Blandus had been suffect consul in 18, the match was considered a social disaster; Tacitus includes the event in a list of "the many sorrows which saddened Rome", which otherwise consisted of deaths of different prominent people. Ronald Syme identifies the historian's reaction as "the tone and sentiments of a man enslaved to the standards of class and rank." Julia was the daughter of Livilla and Drusus Julius Caesar, and the granddaughter of Emperor Tiberius. The marriage produced one attested child, Rubellius Plautus, who was considered a rival to Nero and killed on his orders in 62. Two further sons have been proposed: a funerary inscription refers to a Rubellius Drusus, who died before the age of three, and Juvenal implies the existence of a Rubellius Blandus. Edmund Groag maintains that the latter was a historical figure, whereas Syme suggests that he may either be a literary rendering of Plautus, or an obscure suffect consul, attested with Gaius Annius Pollio. Alternatively, Syme speculates that the consul may be a son of Blandus by a previous wife. Blandus and Julia also appear to have had a daughter, Rubellia Bassa, whose father-in-law was the Laenas above.

== See also ==
- List of Roman consuls

Political offices
Preceded by Lucius Seius Tubero, and Marcus Livineius Regulus as Suffect consuls	Suffect consul of the Roman Empire; 18 with Marcus Vipstanus Gallus	Succeeded by Marcus Junius Silanus Torquatus, and Lucius Norbanus Balbus as Ordinary consuls
