= A.D. (miniseries) =

American/Italian miniseries in six parts

- Directed by: Stuart Cooper
- Starring: Anthony Andrews; Colleen Dewhurst; Ava Gardner; David Hedison; John Houseman; Richard Kiley; James Mason; John McEnery; Ian McShane; Jennifer O'Neill; Millie Perkins; Denis Quilley; Fernando Rey; Richard Roundtree; Susan Sarandon; Ben Vereen; Tony Vogel; Jack Warden; Anthony Zerbe
- Music by: Lalo Schifrin
- Countries of origin: United States; Italy

Production
- Producers: Tarak Ben Ammar & Vincenzo Labella
- Editors: John A. Martinelli, ACE
- Running time: 600 min

Original release
- Release: March 31 – April 5, 1985

A.D. (1985) is an American/Italian miniseries in six parts that adapts the narrative in the Acts of the Apostles. Considered as the third and final installment in a television miniseries trilogy that began with Moses the Lawgiver (1974) and Franco Zeffirelli's Jesus of Nazareth (1977), it was adapted from Anthony Burgess's 1985 novel The Kingdom of the Wicked, which was itself a sequel to Burgess's book Man of Nazareth, on which was based Zeffirelli's movie. The title is the abbreviation for Anno Domini (Medieval Latin, "In the year of the Lord"), as the events occur in the first years of the Christian Era.

== Plot summary ==
The story tells the life histories about Saints Peter and Paul of Tarsus after the crucifixion of Jesus, and their individual fates in old Rome in the time of the persecution of Christians. Events in the New Testament Book of Acts by Luke and in the Ecclesiastical History of Eusebius are dramatized and interwoven with the contrasting histories of political intrigues in the public and private lives of the Caesars from Tiberius through Nero related in The Twelve Caesars by Suetonius, together with the fictional drama of the lives of two Jews and two Romans: Caleb the Zealot and his sister Sarah, and Julius Valerius the Imperial Guard and Corinna the patrician woman who has chosen to be a gladiator.

After Caleb is condemned to be crucified, his mother is murdered when Roman soldiers carry out Pilate's orders to have Caleb's sisters Sarah and Ruth sent to Sejanus in Rome as "gifts". Caleb is rescued on the way to execution, and goes to Rome to find them. He enlists as a gladiator, takes the name "Metellus", meets and falls in love with Corinna, and is trained as a retiarius. Meanwhile, Ruth, grieving, provokes a Roman soldier to kill her during the voyage to Rome, and Sarah is made a slave in Sejanus' household, until he is executed for treason, and she then becomes part of Caligula's household. Tiberius, after ordering the execution of Sejanus, was himself secretly assassinated by Caligula, who has now become Caesar. Julius Valerius, having met Sarah on Sejanus' estate, has fallen in love with her, and when she is put on the slave block to be sold as part of an imperial fund-raising effort he, with the financial help of his parents and additional funds provided by Aquilla and Priscilla, Jewish tent-makers, buys her for himself and frees her to become his wife. Caleb is informed that Sarah is alive, but he is scandalized that she has married a Roman soldier. He meets Valerius and is soon confronted with the fact that he himself loves a Roman woman, now disinherited and disowned by her father.

Valerius and Caleb participate in the plot to assassinate Caligula, and the stammering Claudius (found hiding) is hailed as the new Caesar. He expels the Jews from Rome, but Sarah is exempt as the wife of a Roman. Caleb/Metellus and Corinna also remain. Aquilla and Priscilla return to Jerusalem. Soon afterward Claudius is poisoned by Agrippina after having designated her son Nero as successor over his own son Britannicus, and she herself is then killed by order of Nero.

Caleb later marries Corinna near her parents' estate under the open sky with "only God as the witnessing Rabbi". The missionary Paul is arrested and Julius Valerius is tasked with escorting the prisoner to Rome; then 2 years later he is set free. Valerius and Sarah convert to Christ and soon become parents of a daughter they name Ruth.

The burning of Rome is used by Nero at the urging of Tigellinus as a pretext to deflect the blame from himself to the Christians. The dramatization of the persecution that follows includes the inverted crucifixion of Peter, the beheading of Paul, and the preparation of Christian children for the arena being dressed in fresh lambskins and led out to be torn to pieces by Roman war dogs. Caleb and Corinna armed with sword, shield, net and trident rush into the arena to fight the dogs to save the children, several of them being killed before the dogs are slain. The crowd is thrilled with the dramatic rescue. During public announcements of more entertainment to come, Valerius enters and grieves over the death of his daughter, only to find afterward that she is still alive and was never in the arena. In grief and rage over Rome's corruption and cruelty, he renounces his military career and his Roman citizenship, and he and Sarah leave Rome.

Linus, long-time family friend of Corinna's, having succeeded Peter, and knowing that Corinna cannot have a child of her own, entrusts a child orphaned by Nero's persecution to her and Caleb, charging them to raise the boy in the faith of his parents. They thank him and depart by ship for Jerusalem. They name him "Joshua".

== Cast ==
- Anthony Andrews - Nero
- Colleen Dewhurst - Antonia Minor
- Ava Gardner - Agrippina the Younger
- David Hedison - Porcius Festus
- John Houseman - Gamaliel
- Richard Kiley - Claudius
- James Mason - Tiberius
- John McEnery - Caligula
- Ian McShane - Sejanus
- Jennifer O'Neill - Messalina
- Millie Perkins - Mary, mother of Jesus
- Denis Quilley - Saint Peter
- Fernando Rey - Seneca the Younger
- Richard Roundtree - Serpenius
- Susan Sarandon - Livilla
- Ben Vereen - The Ethiopian
- Tony Vogel - Aquila
- Jack Warden - Nerva
- Anthony Zerbe - Pontius Pilate
- Neil Dickson - Valerius
- Chris Humphreys (billed as Cecil Humphreys) - Caleb
- Amanda Pays - Sarah
- Philip Sayer - Paul of Tarsus
- Diane Venora - Corinna
- Michael Wilding Jr. - Jesus
- Vincent Riotta - Saint Stephen
- Rebecca Saire - Ruth
- Tom Durham - Cleophas
- Anthony Pedley - Zacchaeus
- Harold Kasket - Caiaphas
- Ralph Arliss - Samuel
- Mike Gwilym - Pallas
- Davyd Harries - Thomas
- Bruce Winant - Seth
- Jonathan Hyde - Tigellinus
- Damien Thomas - Agrippa I
- Derek Hoxby - Agrippa II
- Angela Morant - Priscilla
- Clive Arrindell - Cassius Chaerea
- Paul Freeman - Centurion Cornelius
- Andrea Prodan - Britannicus
- Akosua Busia - Claudia Acte
- Vernon Dobtcheff - Titus Flavius Sabinus
- Gerrard McArthur - Luke the Evangelist
- Jane How - Poppaea Sabina
- Jonathan Tafler - Aaron
- Richard Kane - Agrippa Postumus
- Barrie Houghton - Ananias
- Maggie Wickman - Apicata
- Alan Downer - Barnabas
- Martin Potter - Gaius Calpurnius Piso
- Colin Haigh - James the Just
- Renato Scarpa - Lucius Marinus
- Roderick Horn - Marcellus
- John Wheatley - Mark the Evangelist
- Joss Buckley - Matthew the Evangelist
- David Sumner - Saint Matthias
- Stephen Finlay - Nicanor
- Katia Thandoulaki - Claudia Octavia
- Eddie Grossman - Parmenas
- David Haughton - Petronius
- John Steiner - Simon Magus
- Robert Wentz - Thrasyllus
- Philip Anthony - James the Great
- Peter Blythe - Procuius
- Peter Howell - Atticus
- David Rintoul - Pope Linus
- Ned Vukovic - Triumvir
- W. Morgan Sheppard - Gracchus
- Rachel Gurney - mother of Valerius

== Crew ==
- Teleplay by: Anthony Burgess and Vincenzo Labella
- Director of photography: Ennio Guarnieri, AIC
- Costumes by: Enrico Sabbatini

== See also ==
- A.D. The Bible Continues
- Seven Deacons
