= Julia Livia =

Daughter of Drusus Julius Caesar and Livilla and cousin of Caligula (c. AD 7–43)

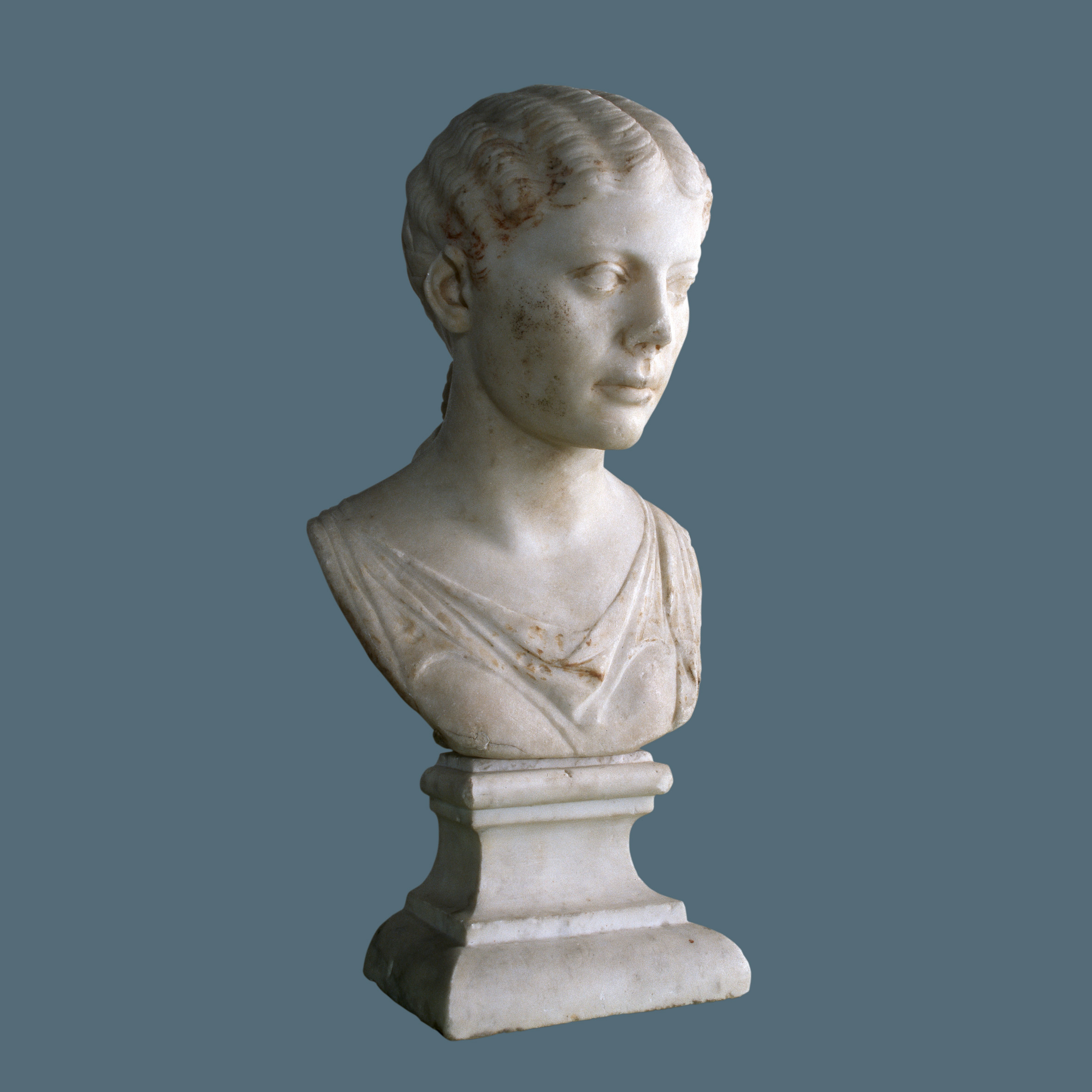
- Born: AD 7
- Died: AD 43 (aged c. 36)
- Spouse: Nero Julius Caesar; Gaius Rubellius Blandus
- Issue: Rubellius Plautus; Gaius Rubellius Blandus; Rubellius Drusus; Rubellia Bassa
- House: Julio-Claudian dynasty
- Father: Drusus Julius Caesar
- Mother: Livilla

Julia Livia (AD 7–43) was the daughter of Drusus Julius Caesar and Livilla, and granddaughter of the Roman Emperor Tiberius. She was also a first cousin of the emperor Caligula, and niece of the emperor Claudius.

== Biography ==
=== Early life ===
Julia was born in the later years of the reign of her adoptive great-grandfather, Emperor Augustus, and was the daughter of Drusus Julius Caesar (a grandson of Augustus' wife Livia Drusilla through her son Tiberius) and Livilla (a granddaughter of Livia Drusilla through her son Nero Claudius Drusus, and a granddaughter of Mark Antony through his daughter Antonia Minor). At the time of Augustus' death in AD 14, Julia, who was in early childhood, fell ill. Before he died, the aged emperor had asked his wife Livia whether Julia had recovered.

=== Marriages ===
Upon the death of Augustus, Julia's paternal grandfather, Tiberius, succeeded him as Rome's second Emperor. It was during her grandfather's rule, when she was around the age of 16, that Julia married her cousin Nero Caesar (the son of Germanicus and Agrippina the Elder). The marriage appears to have been an unhappy one, and fell victim to the machinations of the notorious palace guardsman Sejanus, who exploited his intimacy with Julia's mother Livilla to scheme against Germanicus' family. In the words of Tacitus,

Whether the young prince spoke or held his tongue, silence and speech were alike criminal. Every night had its anxieties, for his sleepless hours, his dreams and sighs were all made known by his wife to her mother Livia [i.e. Livilla] and by Livia to Sejanus.

Later in 29, owing to the intrigues of Sejanus, and at the insistence of Tiberius, Nero and Agrippina were accused of treason. Nero was declared a public enemy by the Senate and taken away in chains in a closed litter. Nero was incarcerated on the island of Pontia (Ponza). The following year he was executed or driven to suicide. Cassius Dio records that Julia was now engaged to Sejanus, but this claim appears to be contradicted by Tacitus, whose authority is to be preferred. Sejanus was condemned and executed on Tiberius' orders on 18 October 31. His lover, Julia's mother Livilla, died around the same time (probably starved by her own mother: Julia's grandmother Antonia, or committed suicide).

In 33, Julia married Gaius Rubellius Blandus, a man from an equestrian background. Although Blandus had been consul suffect in 18, the match was considered a disaster; Tacitus includes the event in a list of "the many sorrows which saddened Rome", which otherwise consisted of deaths of different influential people. They had one attested child, Rubellius Plautus, who was killed on Nero's orders in 62. Juvenal, alludes to another Rubellius Blandus as their son and a funerary inscription implies Julia was probably the mother of Rubellius Drusus, a child who died before the age of three. Edmund Groag maintains that the former was a historical figure, whereas Ronald Syme suggests that he may either be a literary rendering of Plautus, or an obscure suffect consul, attested with Gaius Annius Pollio. Alternatively, Syme speculates that the consul may be a son of Blandus by a previous wife. Blandus and Julia also appear to have had a daughter, Rubellia Bassa, who married a maternal uncle of the future Roman Emperor Nerva.

Around 43, an agent of the Roman Emperor Claudius' wife, Empress Valeria Messalina, had falsely charged Julia with incest and immorality. Messalina considered her and her son a threat to the throne. The Emperor, her uncle Claudius, without securing any defence for his niece, had her executed 'by the sword' (Octavia 944–946: "ferro... caesa est"). She may have anticipated execution by taking her own life. Her distant relative Pomponia Graecina remained in mourning for 40 years in open defiance of the Emperor, yet was unpunished. Julia was executed around the same time as her first cousin Julia Livilla, the daughter of Germanicus and sister of the former Emperor Caligula.

== Cultural depictions ==
In Robert Graves' novels I, Claudius and Claudius the God Julia was known as "Helen the Glutton". Graves did this as comic relief in the novels, but in reality she did not have a reputation for gluttony.

In the 1976 television adaptation she was played by Karin Foley. It unhistorically has her mother attempting to poison her to prevent Sejanus from marrying her, but it is not explicit about whether she died as a result, so glossing over her fate under Claudius.

== Ancestry ==
Ancestors of Julia Livia

8. (=12.) Tiberius Claudius Nero
4. Tiberius
9. (=13.) Livia Drusilla
2. Drusus Julius Caesar
10. Marcus Vipsanius Agrippa
5. Vipsania Agrippina
11. Caecilia Attica
1. Julia Livia
12. (=8.) Tiberius Claudius Nero
6. Nero Claudius Drusus
13. (=9.) Livia Drusilla
3. Livilla
14. Mark Antony
7. Antonia Minor
15. Octavia Minor
