= Crown of Sancho IV =

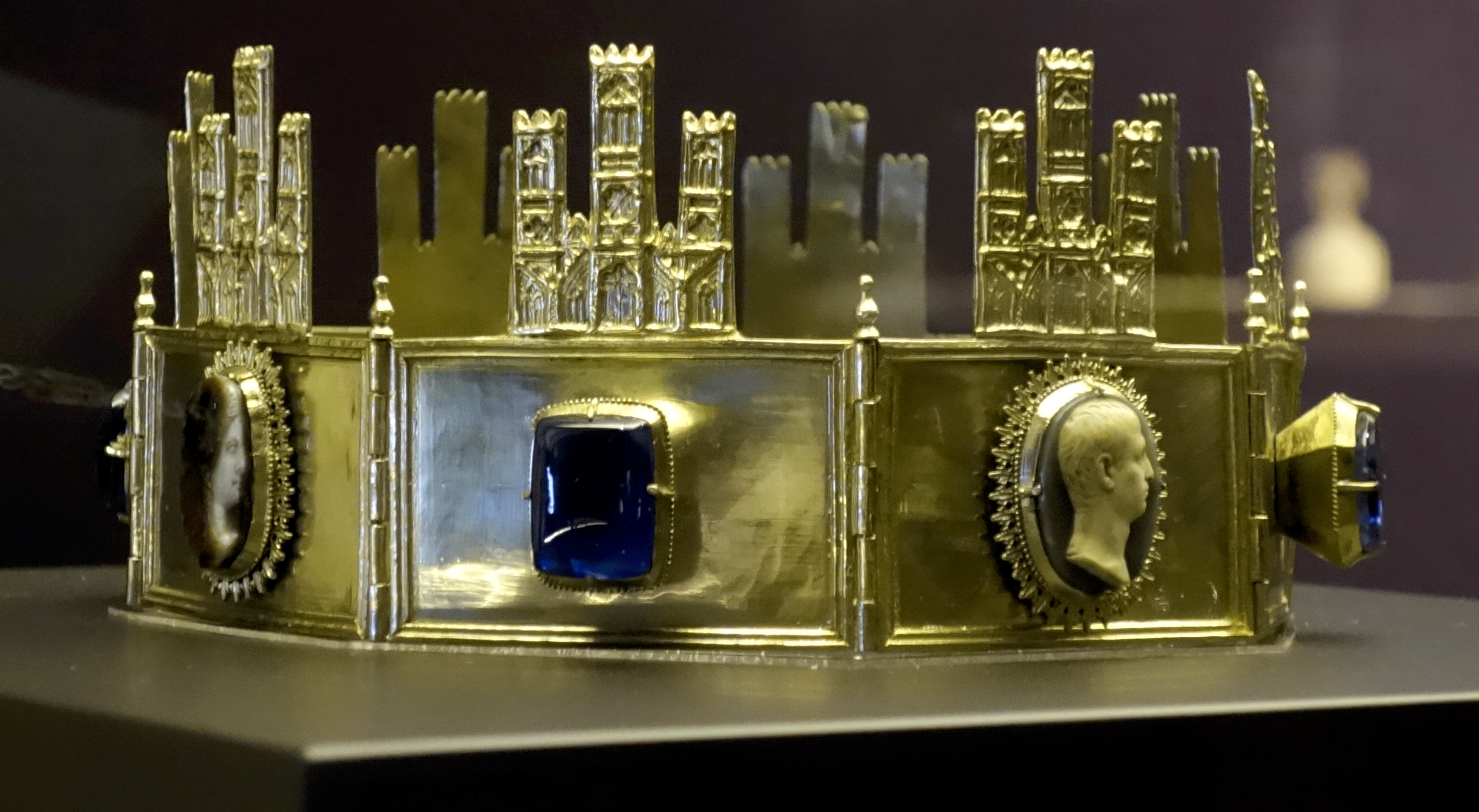

Details
- Country: Spain
- Made: XIII century
- Arches: None
- Material: Silver-gilt
- Notable stones: 4 sapphires 4 cameos

The crown of Sancho IV, imperial crown or crown of the cameos is a royal crown which belonged to King Sancho IV of Castile. The crown was first mentioned by Alfonso X of Castile in his will on 21 January 1284. Known to have been worn at least by kings Fernando III, Alfonso X, and Sancho IV, the crown was buried with the latter in the Cathedral of Toledo, and fortuitously discovered in 1948 when archaeologists were conducting a search for the tomb of Sancho II of Portugal. As such, it is one of very few extant and entirely unmodified medieval royal crowns in existence.

== Description ==
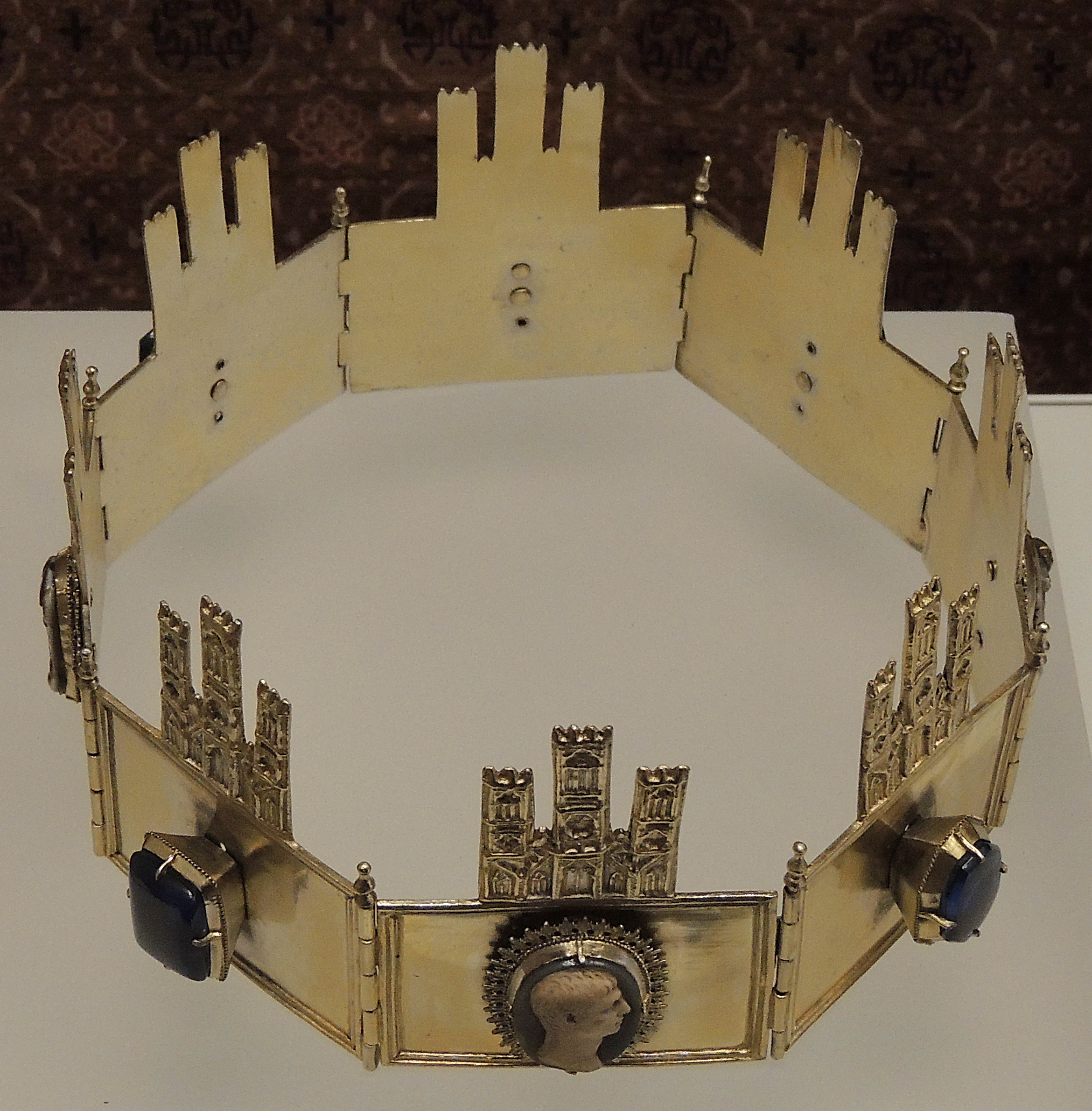
Crown of Sancho IV, showing the hinges and the 1st century cameo of Drusus the Younger.

The crown, measuring some 57×8cm, is made up of eight 7×4.5cm gilded silver plates joined by hinges. At the top, in the centre of each plate, is a heraldic castle with three towers.

In the centre of each plaque is a precious stone or a cameo. Four have uncut sapphires; alternating with the sapphires are four cameos: two of Imperial Roman origin and two of Staufer or Southern Italian origin. The two Roman cameos, dating back to the 1st century CE, depict portraits of Drusus the Younger and Queen Omphale, covered with the skin of the Lion of Nemea. The medieval Italian cameos copy the style of ancient Roman cameos, and depict two unidentified men.

== History ==
The crown was mentioned for the first time in the will of Alfonso X the Wise on 21 January 1284:

[...] e las coronas con las piedras e los camafeos que lo haya todo aquel que con derecho por nos heredase nuestro señoría mayor de Castilla y León. [...and the crowns with the stones and the cameos, may them be had by whoever rightfully inherits from us our lordship of Castilla and Leon.]

The three preserved copies of the will speak of crowns in plural. The use of cameos in Castilian royal crowns seems to not have been infrequent. Indeed, on 1 November 1362 Pedro I of Castile granted his testament in Seville, in which he wrote:

[...] I also command to the said Infanta Doña Constanza, my daughter, the crown that belonged to my father's king [...] in which are the cameos.

The treatment of the royal crowns and jewels was similar to the distribution of the family jewels of a father to his children. Sancho IV ordered his burial in the Cathedral of Toledo in 1285:

[...] we choose our burial in the Holy Church of Santa María aforesaid [of Toledo]. And when it might be God's will that we shall perish, we order that we be entombed in that place we arranged with archbishop don Gonçalvo and the dean Miguel Ximénez[...]

On the death of King Sancho IV on 25 April 1295, he was buried in a chapel of the Cathedral which the king himself had ordered be built, and to which he had transferred the remains of all other monarchs buried in Toledo. The tomb, probably a simple stone box, was soon replaced by a better one, ordered by his widow. The body was transferred to the new tomb in 1308, which possibly corresponds to the one that can be seen today to the right of the main altar. The body was moved again in the 16th century by order of Cardinal Cisneros, who placed them in their current location, where the crown was found.

== Discovery ==
The crown was found in 1948 during the search for the tomb of Sancho II of Portugal in the high altar area of Toledo Cathedral. Four sarcophagi were found: that of Alfonso VI of Castile, that of his son Sancho III of Castile, that of Sancho IV, and that of the infant Pedro, son of Alfonso XI of Castile. These sarcophagi had miraculously escaped the plundering of the comuneros and the Napoleonic troops. The body of Sancho IV was found wrapped in a quilt.

The corpse of a man, of tall stature, appeared open, for in the process of sepulchral corruption the soles of his feet, which ordinarily form an angle with his legs, were shown to have fallen forward; he also wore a crown of eight links, supported by a hempen cord which, like a chinstrap, passed under his chin. The corpse, mummified and in an excellent state of preservation, was naked from the waist up and wore a kind of panty or pants and a San Francisco cord around his waist. Wearing fine leather shoes, he carried a broad-bladed sword with an illegible inscription and on the upper part of the pommel some enamels, which are now missing, and a circular ornament, which may have originally contained some enamel or relic, as the arabesques on one of its sides suggest.

— J. F. Rivera Recio (1985)

The crown is currently held in the cathedral of Toledo.
