= Apicata =

Wife of Sejanus, friend and confidant of the Roman Emperor Tiberius

Apicata was a woman of the 1st century AD in ancient Rome. She was married to Sejanus, friend and confidant of the Roman Emperor Tiberius.

== Biography ==
=== Early life ===
Apicata may have been the daughter of Marcus Gavius Apicius, a gourmet who knew Sejanus when the latter was a young man. The reason for this assumption is mainly her unusual name "Apicata", which was likely a nickname derived from a cognomen instead of a common name for a woman of a Roman family. The name of Sejanus's wife can be found removed from an inscription but it appears to be a short name similar in length to Livia; Gavia would suit. Jane Bellemore has disputed that the woman named on the inscription was Apicata, and argued that the name could have belonged to a later wife of Sejanus (possibly Livilla).

=== Marriage ===
Apicata had borne Sejanus three children. He divorced her in the year 23 AD, when it seemed he might be able to marry his lover and co-conspirator Livilla, the wife of Drusus Julius Caesar (son of Tiberius). Drusus was a challenger to Sejanus's quest for power, but died in 23. Sejanus was reportedly seeking the imperial seat for himself and marriage to a member of the imperial family would have made his claim more plausible.

=== Accusation against Sejanus and death ===
Eight years later, in 31, Sejanus was accused of crimes severe enough to warrant his immediate execution, and he was killed. Sejanus and Apicata's three children were to be put to death as well so that Sejanus's line might have no more heirs. Their eldest son, Strabo, was executed six days later. According to Cassius Dio, Apicata wrote a letter to Tiberius accusing Sejanus and Livilla of having conspired to murder Drusus eight years earlier. Before (Note: The historian Cassius Dio records Apicata's death as having happened after all three of her children died, while the Fasti Ostienses records her as killing herself after her first child was killed, but before the second two.) the executions of her younger two children, Aelia Iunilla and Capito Aelianus, Apicata herself committed suicide.[The story should be read with caution. Barbara Levick says that Sejanus must have murdered Drusus in self-defense because only Tiberius stood between the Praetorian Prefect and the end of his career at the hands of Drusus. Furthermore, he says it is even less likely that Livilla would have been complicit in the destruction of her family, the key to her children's future. Levick dismisses the accusation of Apicata as the revenge of a woman whose husband left her for another.]

How Apicata came to be aware of Sejanus's crime is not known, as is whether the accusation was true at all, but her accusation was taken seriously. Tiberius had Livilla's slave Lygdus and Livilla's physician Eudemus tortured in order to extract a confirmation of this accusation.

Livilla was convicted. Her co-conspirators were condemned to death, though Dio reports that Livilla herself may have been spared from public execution "out of regard for her mother Antonia." It is not certain how Livilla died. The sources speculate that she was either executed privately or committed suicide. According to the historian Cassius Dio, Livilla was given over to her mother, Antonia Minor, who had Livilla starved to death.

== Legacy ==
The modern narrative of Apicata often renders her as an avenger on a treacherous husband and the woman of higher station who broke up her marriage, and possibly scheming as much as her ex-husband, especially if her accusations were not true; contemporary epigraphy suggests in her time she elicited little sympathy and was seen as treacherous herself, and tainted by association with Sejanus.

== See also ==
- List of Roman women
