= Eudemus (physician) =

Eudemus (Greek: Εὔδημος) was the name of several Greek physicians, whom it is difficult to distinguish with certainty:

- A druggist, who apparently lived in the 4th or 3rd century BC. He is said by Theophrastus, to have been eminent in his trade, and to have professed to be able to take hellebore without being purged.
- A celebrated anatomist, who lived probably about the 3rd century BC, as Galen calls him a contemporary of Herophilus and Erasistratus. He appears to have given particular attention to the anatomy and physiology of the nervous system. He considered the metacarpus and metatarsus each to consist of five bones, on which point Galen differed from him, but modern anatomists agree with him. He, however, fell into the error of supposing the acromion to be a distinct and separate bone.
- A physician at Rome, who was the paramour of Livilla, the wife of Drusus Julius Caesar, the son of the emperor Tiberius, and who joined her and Sejanus in their plot for poisoning her husband, 23 AD. He was afterwards put to the torture. He is supposed to be the same person who is said by Caelius Aurelianus to have been one of the followers of Themison, and whose medical observations on hydrophobia and some other diseases are quoted by him. He appears to be the same physician who is mentioned by Galen among several others as belonging to the Methodic school.
- A contemporary and personal acquaintance of Galen, in the latter part of the 2nd century.

The name is also mentioned several times by Galen, Athenaeus, and by other writers.
