= Antonia Minor =

Roman noblewoman (36 BC–AD 37)

- Augusta
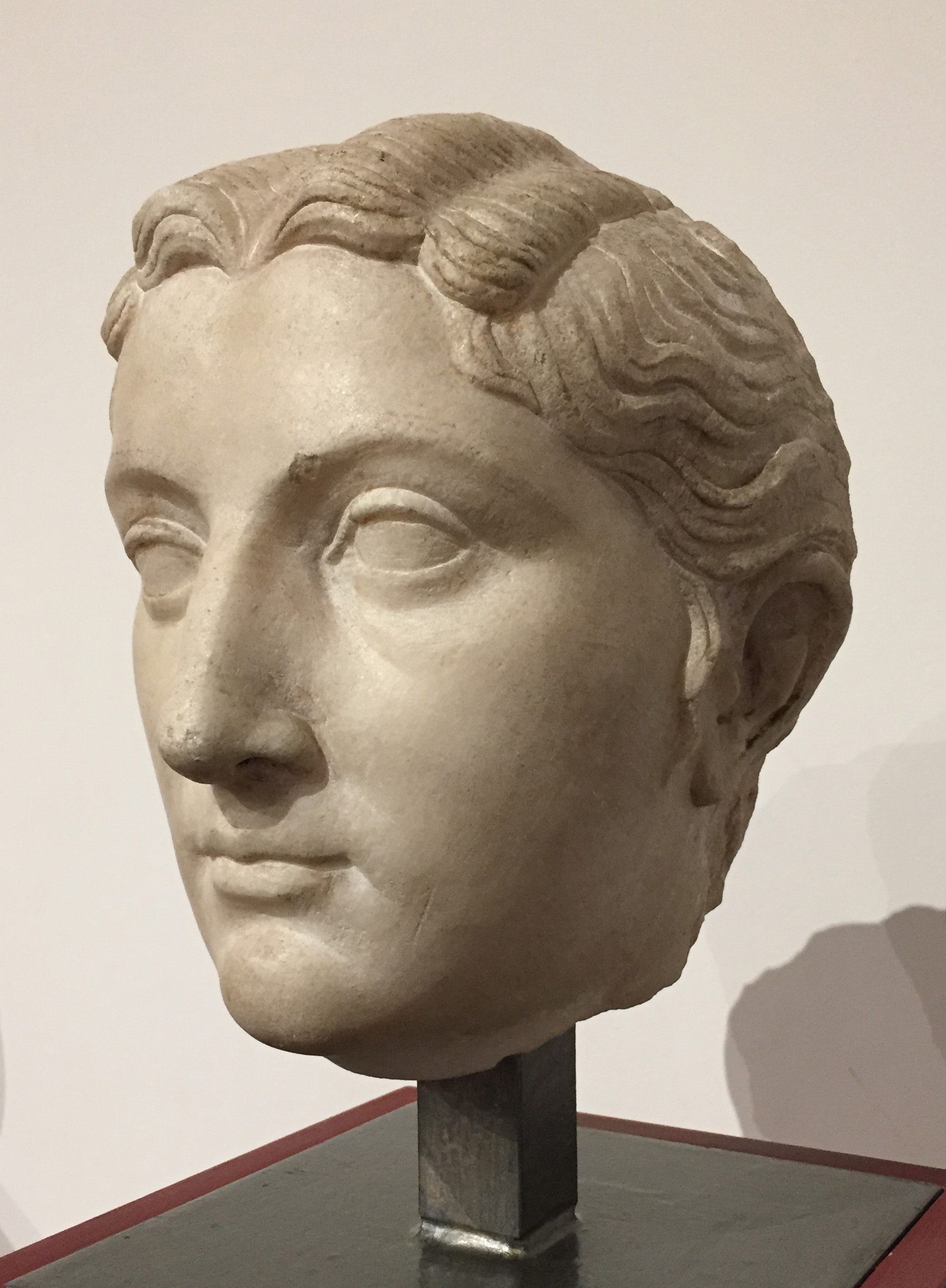
- Bust of Antonia Minor (29–67 AD)
- Born: 31 January 36 BC; Athens, Greece, Roman Republic
- Died: 1 May 37 AD (aged 72); Rome, Italy, Roman Empire
- Spouse: Nero Claudius Drusus
- Issue: Germanicus; Livilla; Claudius, Roman Emperor
- Father: Mark Antony
- Mother: Octavia Minor

Antonia Minor (Note: Translated as Antonia the Younger, but is often known as just Antonia.) (31 January 36 BC – 1 May 37 AD) was the younger of two surviving daughters of Mark Antony and Octavia Minor. She was a niece of the Emperor Augustus, sister-in-law of the Emperor Tiberius, paternal grandmother of the Emperor Caligula and Empress Agrippina the Younger, mother of the Emperor Claudius, and maternal great-grandmother and paternal grandaunt of the Emperor Nero. She outlived her husband Nero Claudius Drusus, her oldest son, her daughter, and several of her grandchildren.

== Biography ==
=== Birth and early life ===
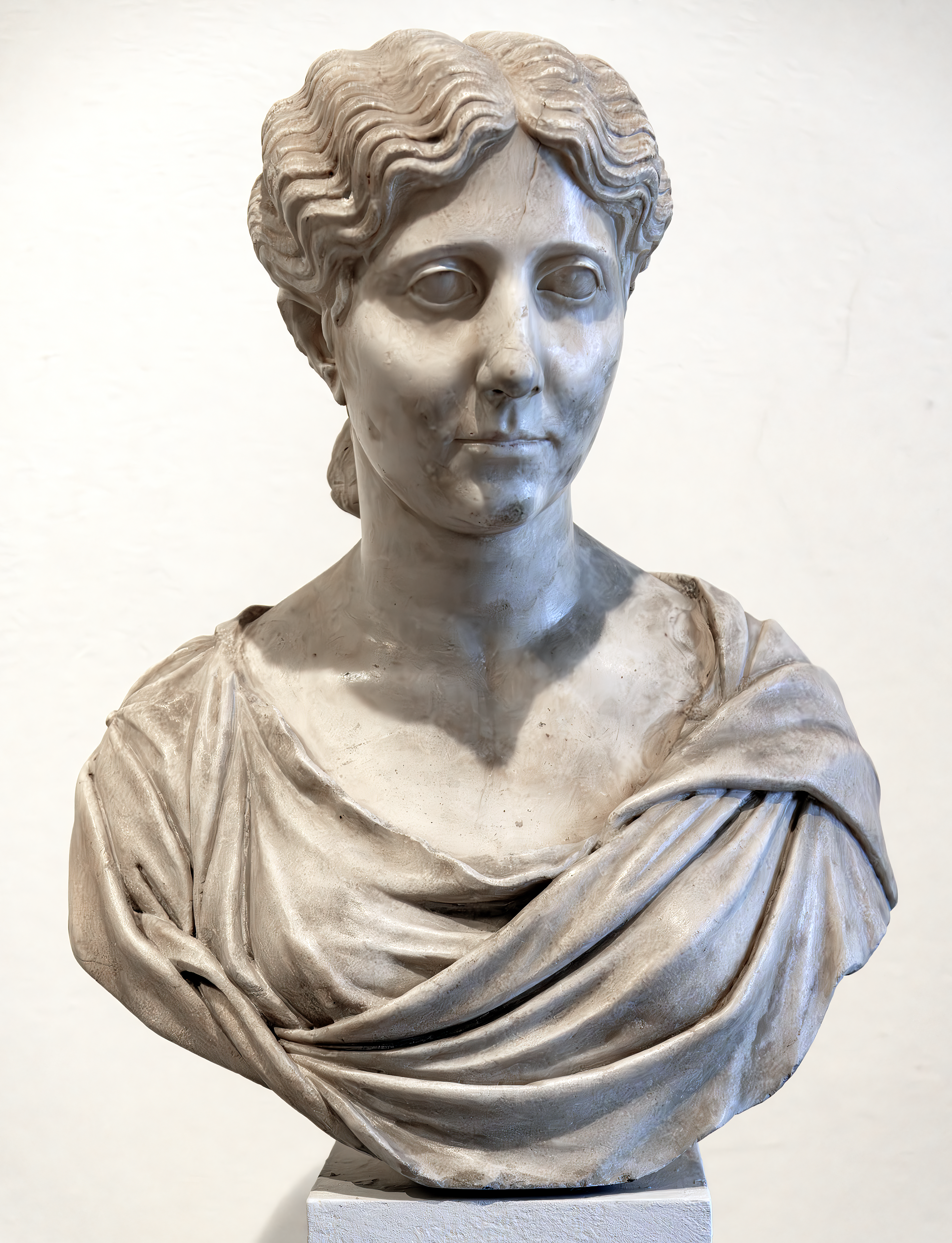
Antonia Minor in Museo Archeologico Nazionale of Venice, second half of the 1st century AD

She was born in Athens, and after 36 BC was taken to Rome by her mother with her siblings. She was the youngest of five. Her mother had three children, named Claudia Marcella Major, Claudia Marcella Minor, and Marcus Claudius Marcellus, from her first marriage and another daughter, named Antonia Major, by the same father (Mark Antony). Antonia never knew her father; Mark Antony divorced her mother in 32 BC and committed suicide in 30 BC.

She was raised by her mother, her uncle, and her aunt, Livia Drusilla and inherited properties in Italy, Greece, and Egypt. She was said to have received visitors to her house, such as Valerius Asiaticus and Lucius Vitellius, a consul and the father of the future emperor Aulus Vitellius.

=== Marriage and family ===
In 16 BC, she married the Roman general and future consul (9 BC) Nero Claudius Drusus. Drusus was the stepson of her uncle Augustus, second son of Livia Drusilla, and brother of future Emperor Tiberius. They had many children, but only three survived: the famous general Germanicus, Livilla, and the Roman Emperor Claudius.

A poem by Crinagoras of Mytilene mentions Antonia's first pregnancy, which may be of a child before Germanicus who must have died in infancy or early childhood.

Drusus died in 9 June BC in Germany, due to complications from injuries he sustained after falling from a horse. After his death, although pressured by her uncle to remarry, she never did.

Antonia raised her children in Rome. Tiberius adopted Germanicus in 4 AD. Germanicus died in 19 AD, allegedly poisoned through the handiwork of Gnaeus Calpurnius Piso and Munatia Plancina. Tacitus suggests but does not outright say in Annals 3.3 that, on the orders of Tiberius and Livia Drusilla, Antonia was forbidden to go to his funeral. When Livia Drusilla died in June of 29 AD, Antonia took care of her younger grandchildren Caligula, Agrippina the Younger, Julia Drusilla, Julia Livilla, and later Claudia Antonia.

=== Conflict with Livilla ===
In 31 AD, a plot by her daughter Livilla and Tiberius's Praetorian prefect, Sejanus, to murder the Emperor Tiberius and Caligula and to seize the throne for themselves, was exposed by Apicata, the estranged ex-wife of Sejanus. Livilla allegedly poisoned her husband, Tiberius's son, Drusus Julius Caesar (nicknamed "Castor"), in 23 AD to remove him as a rival.

Sejanus was executed before Livilla was implicated in the crime. After Apicata's accusation, which came in the form of a letter to the emperor, several co-conspirators were executed while Livilla was handed over to her mother for punishment. Cassius Dio states that Antonia imprisoned Livilla in her room until she starved to death.

=== Succession of Caligula and death ===
When Tiberius died, Caligula became emperor in March 37 AD. Caligula awarded her a senatorial decree, granting her all the honors that Livia Drusilla had received in her lifetime. She was also offered the title of Augusta, previously only given to Augustus's wife Livia, but rejected it.

Antonia died on 1 May 37. Suetonius and Cassius Dio reported that she was driven to suicide by Caligula. According to Barrett,

But since he had not reached Rome until 28 March, and was absent from the city for much of April, collecting the remains of his mother and brother, there would hardly have been much time to drive Antonia to her death by insulting behaviour. It is also difficult to imagine that he would have paid her no honours on her death, as Suetonius implies. She died at a time when the euphoria of the beginning of his reign was still rampant, and quite apart from any question of personal affection, a public slight at this time to the most respected woman in Rome, whose death was marked in local Fasti, would have been politically unimaginable.

When Claudius became emperor after his nephew's assassination in 41 AD, he gave his mother the title of Augusta. Her birthday became a public holiday, which had yearly games and public sacrifices held. An image of her was paraded in a carriage.

== Cultural depictions ==
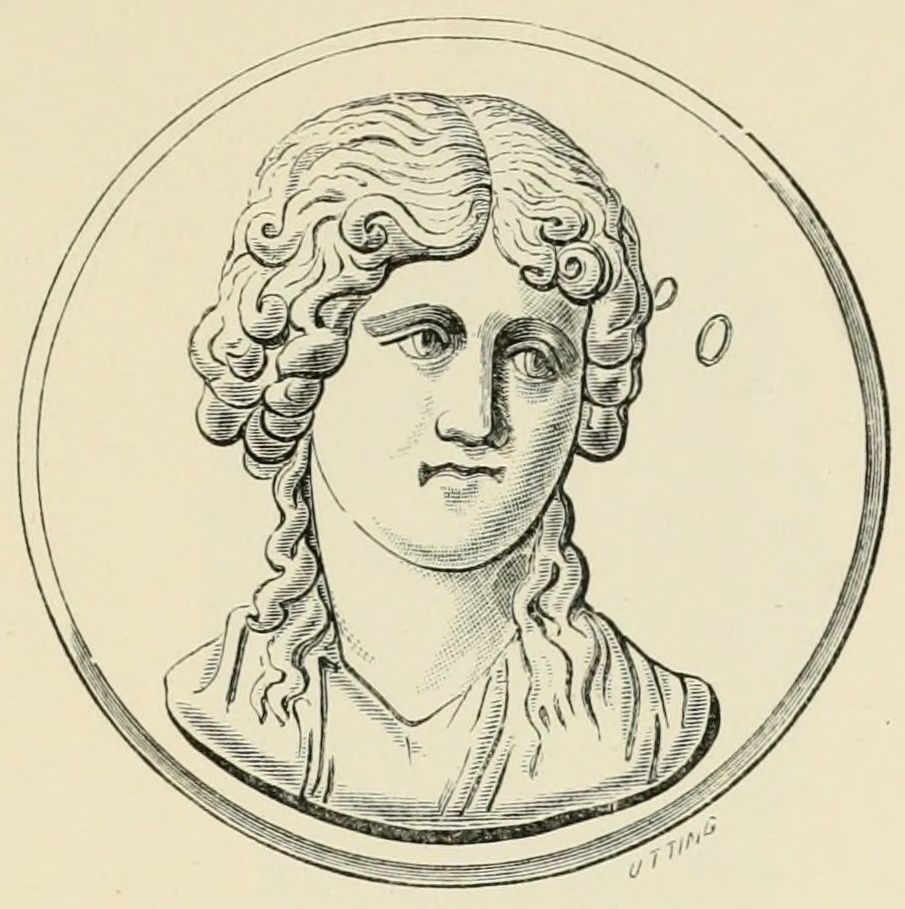
Likeness after a bust of Antonia on an engraved gem found at Stanwix, near Carlisle

She is remembered in De Mulieribus Claris, a collection of biographies of historical and mythological women by the Florentine author Giovanni Boccaccio, composed in 1361–1362. It is notable as the first collection devoted exclusively to biographies of women in Western literature.

Antonia is one of the main characters in the novel I, Claudius. In the 1976 television adaptation of the book she is portrayed by Margaret Tyzack. She is a loyal wife deeply in love with her husband Nero Claudius Drusus. However, she is unloving towards her son Claudius, whom she regards as a fool. Furthermore, after finding evidence that Livilla murdered her husband Drusus Julius Caesar and rightfully believing she was also poisoning her daughter for the same reason, she kills Livilla by locking her in her room until she starves to death. During the reign of Caligula she is so disgusted by the state of Rome that she commits suicide.

She is a leading character in a novel by Lindsey Davis, The Course of Honour (1997), in which she guides and advises Claudius and his supporters.

In the 1968 ITV historical drama The Caesars, Antonia is indirectly mentioned by Tiberius (played by André Morell), who notes that Germanicus was a blood relative of Augustus on his mother's [Antonia] side.

Colleen Dewhurst portrays Antonia opposite Susan Sarandon as Livilla in the 1985 miniseries A.D.

Isabelle Connolly (adult) and Beau Gadsdon (child) portray Antonia in British-Italian historical drama television series Domina (2021).

== Sources ==
=== Ancient ===
- Plutarch – Life of Mark Antony
- Suetonius – Caligula (Gaius) & Claudius
- Tacitus – Annals of Imperial Rome
- Valerius Maximus, Factorum et dictorum memorabilium libri iv.3.3

=== Secondary ===
- E. Groag, A. Stein, L. Petersen - e.a. (edd.), Prosopographia Imperii Romani saeculi I, II et III, Berlin, 1933 – . (PIR^{2})
- Burns, Jasper (2006), Great Women of Imperial Rome: Mothers and Wives of the Caesars, Routledge, ISBN 978-0415408974
- Levick, Barbara (1990). Claudius. Routledge.
