= Rubellius Blandus =

Lucius Rubellius Blandus was a Roman, native of Tibur (Tivoli, Italy). He was the first Equestrian of Ancient Rome to teach rhetoric and thus made it more respectable (Sen., Controv. 2, praef. 5). He was the teacher of Papirius Fabianus, who was in turn the teacher of Seneca the Younger. His grandson Gaius Rubellius Blandus was a suffect consul of 18.
