= Edmund Groag =

Austrian classical historian and librarian (1873–1945)

Edmund Groag (2 February 1873, in Prerau – 19 August 1945, in Vienna) was an Austrian classical scholar, who specialized in Roman history.

From 1892 he studied history and philology at the University of Vienna, receiving his doctorate in 1895 with the dissertation on Tacitus, Zur Kritik von Tacitus’ Quellen in den Historien. By way of a study grant he visited Rome in 1898/99, then in 1901 began work at the Vienna National Library, an institution that he would be associated with for most of his career. In 1918 he obtained his habilitation at the university, where in 1925 he was named an associate professor of Roman history. In 1933 he became a member of the German Archaeological Institute.

He was born into a Jewish family and converted to Catholicism in 1901. Despite this, he was removed from his position at the university for racial reasons following the Anschluss. During the Nazi takeover of Austria, he lived in a precarious state in Vienna. He died from an illness a few months after liberation of the city.

With Arthur Stein (1871–1950), he published an unfinished second edition of the Prosopographia Imperii Romani (3 volumes, 1933–43). He was also the author of many articles in the Realencyclopädie der classischen Altertumswissenschaft.

== Selected works ==
- Die Adoption Hadrians, 1899 – The adoption of Hadrian.
- Die römischen Inschriftsteine der Hofbibliothek, 1913 – The Roman inscription stones of the court library.
- Geschichte des Altertums bis zur Begründung des römischen Kaiserreiches (with Heinrich Montzka, 1914) – Ancient history up to the establishment of the Roman Empire.
- Beiträge zur Geschichte des zweiten Triumvirats, 1915 – Contributions to the history of the Second Triumvirate.
- Studien zur römischen Kaisergeschichte (2 parts 1918–19) – Studies of Roman Emperor history.
- Römische Cäsaren, 1926 – Roman Caesars.
- Neue Literatur über Caesar und Augustus, 1926 – New literature on Caesar and Augustus.
- Der Dichter Porfyrius in einer stadtrömischen Inschrift 1926/27 – The poet Porfyrius from an urban Roman inscription.
- Hannibal als Politiker, 1929 – Hannibal as a politician.
- Prosopographische Bemerkungen, 1931 – Prosopographical remarks.
- Die römischen Reichsbeamten von Achaia bis auf Diokletian, 1939 – Roman Empire officials of Achaia up until Diocletian.
- Die Reichsbeamten von Achaia in spätrömischer Zeit, 1946 – The Imperial officials of Achaia in the late Roman era.
