= Livilla =

Woman of the Julio-Claudian dynasty (died AD 31)

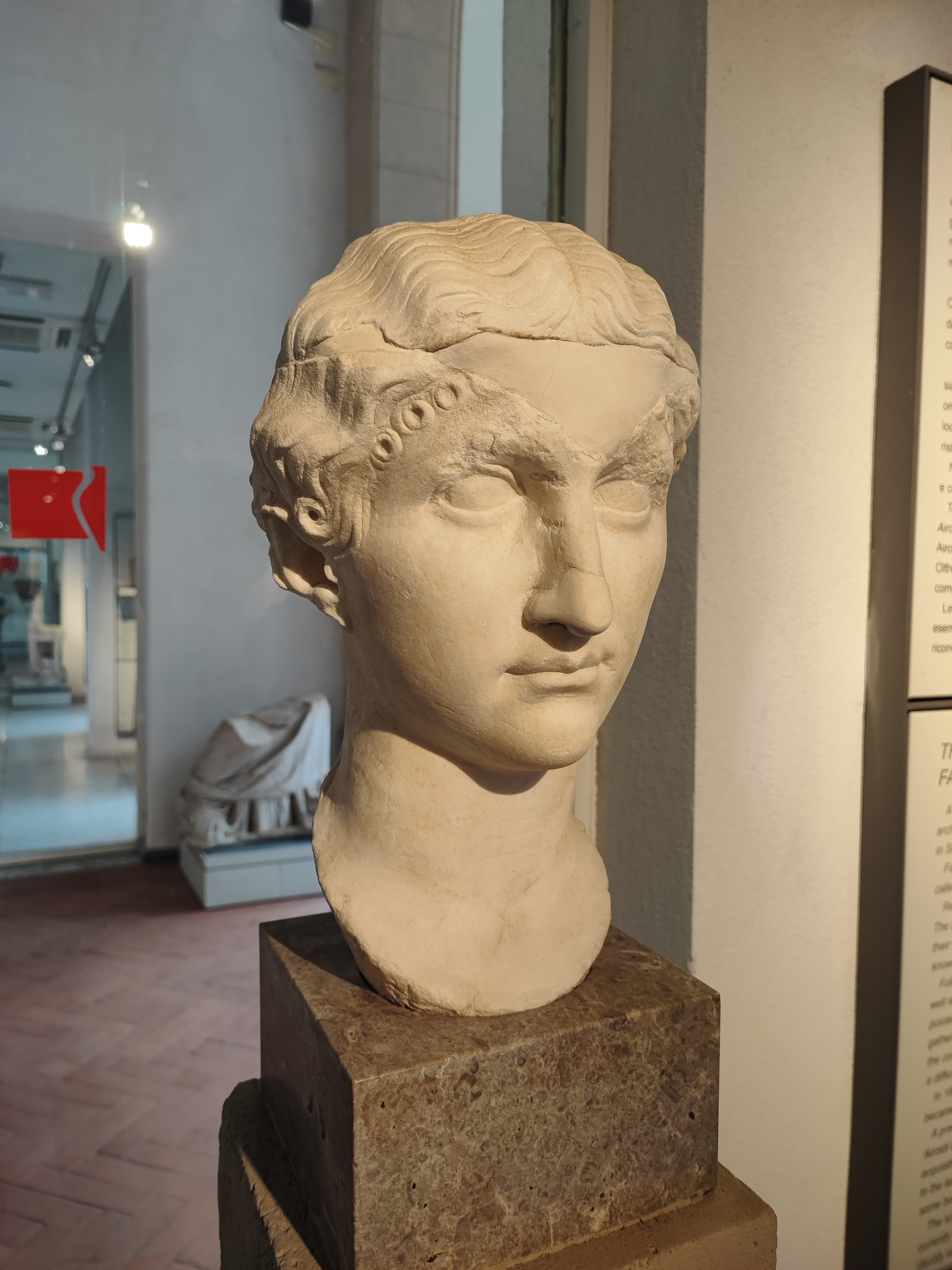
- Bust of a Julio-Claudian princess, probably of Livilla (Antonino Salinas Regional Archaeological Museum)
- Born: 13 BC; Lugdunum, Gaul
- Died: AD 31 (aged 42–43)
- Spouse: Gaius Caesar; Drusus Julius Caesar
- Issue: Julia Livia; Tiberius Gemellus; Germanicus Gemellus
- Dynasty: Julio-Claudian
- Father: Nero Claudius Drusus
- Mother: Antonia Minor

Claudia Livia (Classical Latin: CLAVDIA•LIVIA; c. 13 BC – AD 31) was the only daughter of Nero Claudius Drusus and Antonia Minor and sister to Roman Emperor Claudius and general Germanicus, and thus paternal aunt of emperor Caligula and maternal great-aunt of emperor Nero, as well as the niece and daughter-in-law of Tiberius. She was named after her grandmother, Augustus' wife Livia Drusilla, and commonly known by her family nickname Livilla ("little Livia"). She was born after Germanicus and before Claudius.

She was twice married to the potential successor in the Julio-Claudian dynasty, first to Augustus' grandson Gaius Caesar (died AD 4) and later to Tiberius' son Drusus the Younger (died AD 23). Allegedly, she helped her lover Sejanus in poisoning her second husband and died shortly after Sejanus fell from power in AD 31.

== Marriages ==
Livilla was married twice, first in 1 BC to Gaius Caesar, Augustus' grandson and heir. Thus, Augustus had chosen Livilla as the wife of the future emperor. This splendid royal marriage probably gave Livilla grand aspirations for her future, perhaps at the expense of the ambition of Augustus' granddaughters, Agrippina the Elder and Julia the Younger. However, Gaius died in AD 4, cutting short Augustus' and Livilla's plans.

In the same year, Livilla married her cousin Drusus Julius Caesar (Drusus the Younger), the son of Tiberius. When Tiberius succeeded Augustus as emperor in AD 14, Livilla again was the wife of a potential successor. Drusus and Livilla had three children, a daughter named Julia Livia in around AD 7 and twin sons in AD 19: Germanicus Gemellus, who died in 23, and Tiberius Gemellus, who survived infancy.

== Livilla's standing in her family ==
Tacitus reports that Livilla was a remarkably beautiful woman, despite the fact she was rather ungainly as a child. The Senatus Consultum de Cn. Pisone patre indicates that she was held in the highest esteem by her uncle and father-in-law, Tiberius, and by her grandmother Livia Drusilla.

According to Tacitus, she felt resentment and jealousy against her sister-in-law Agrippina the Elder, the wife of her brother Germanicus, to whom she was unfavourably compared. Indeed, Agrippina fared much better in producing imperial heirs to the household (being the mother of the Emperor Caligula and Agrippina the Younger) and was much more popular. Suetonius reports that she despised her younger brother Claudius; having heard he would one day become Emperor, she deplored publicly such a fate for the Roman people.

As with most of the female members of the Julio-Claudian dynasty, she may also have been very ambitious, in particular for her male offspring.

== Affair with Sejanus ==
Possibly even before the birth of the twins, Livilla had an affair with Lucius Aelius Sejanus, the praetorian prefect of Tiberius – later on, some (including Tiberius) suspected Sejanus to have fathered the twins. Drusus, heir apparent since the death of Germanicus in AD 19, died in AD 23, shortly after striking Sejanus in an argument. According to Tacitus, Suetonius, and Cassius Dio, Sejanus had poisoned Drusus, not only because he feared the wrath of the future Emperor but also because he had designs on the supreme power, and aimed at removing a potential competitor, with Livilla as his accomplice. If Drusus was indeed poisoned, his death aroused no suspicions at the time.

Sejanus now wanted to marry the widowed Livilla. In AD 25 Tiberius rejected such a request but in AD 31 he eventually gave way. In the same year, the Emperor received evidence from Antonia Minor, Livilla's mother and his sister-in-law, that Sejanus planned to overthrow him. Tiberius had Sejanus denounced in the Senate, then had him arrested and dragged off to prison to be put to death. A bloody purge then erupted in Rome with most of Sejanus' family (including his children) and followers sharing his fate.

== Accusations and death ==
Hearing of the death of her children, Sejanus' former wife Apicata committed suicide. According to Cassius Dio, before her death, she addressed a letter to Tiberius, accusing Sejanus and Livilla of having poisoned Drusus. [The story should be read with caution. Barbara Levick says that Sejanus must have murdered Drusus in self-defense because only Tiberius stood between the Praetorian Prefect and the end of his career at the hands of Drusus. Furthermore, she says it is even less likely that Livilla would have been complicit in the destruction of her family, the key to her children's future. Levick dismisses the accusation of Apicata as the revenge of a woman whose husband left her for another.] Drusus' cupbearer Lygdus and Livilla's physician Eudemus were questioned and under torture confirmed Apicata's accusation.

Livilla died shortly afterwards, either being killed or by suicide. According to Cassius Dio, Tiberius handed Livilla over to her mother, Antonia Minor, who locked her up in a room and starved her to death.

Early in AD 32, the Senate proposed "terrible decrees...against her very statues and memory" (damnatio memoriae).

Posthumously, there were further allegations of adultery with her physician Eudemus and with the senator and poet Mamercus Aemilius Scaurus.

== Portraiture ==
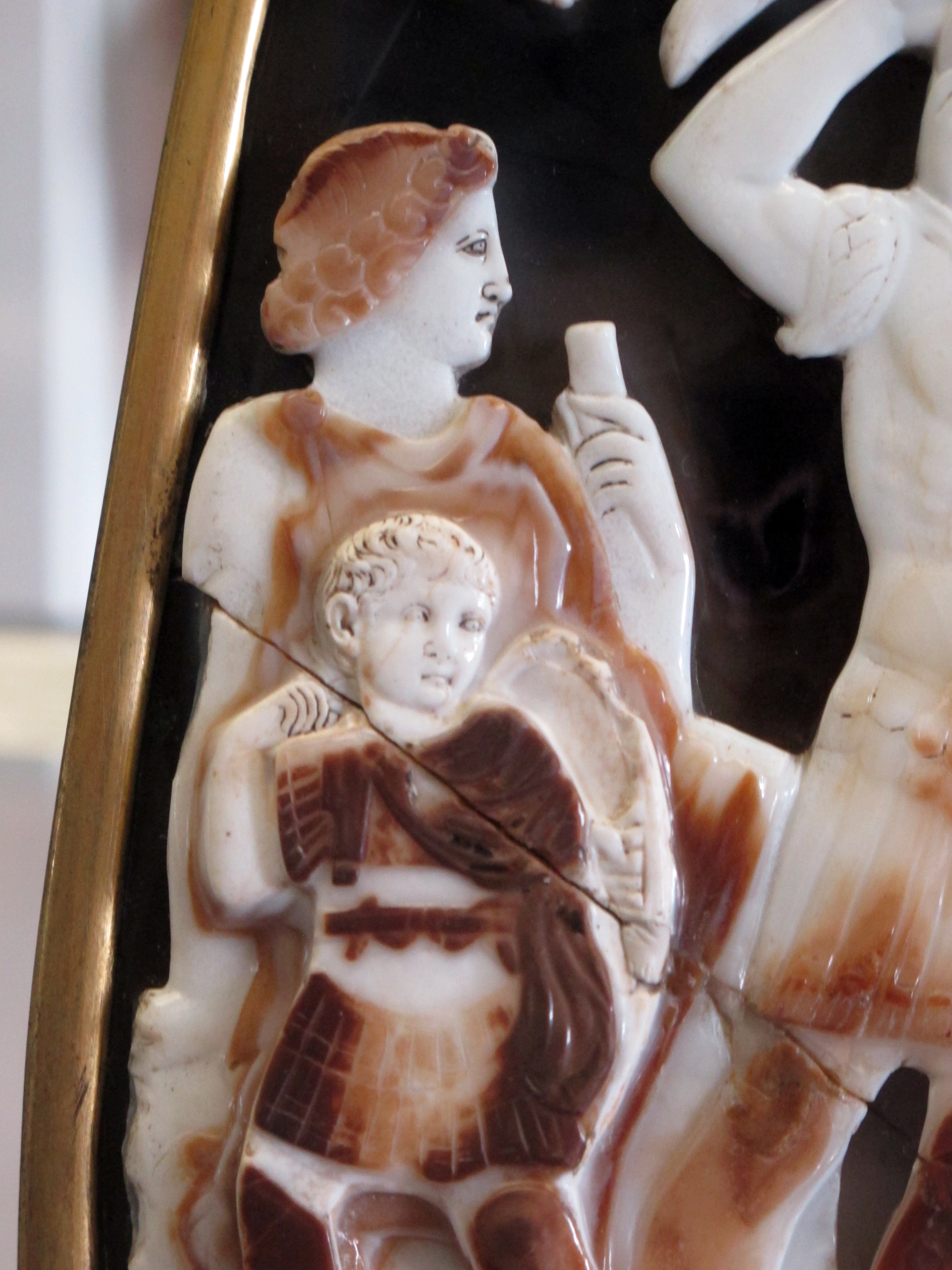
Woman on the Great Cameo of France who may be Livilla

The iconographic identification of Livilla has posed many problems, mainly due to the damnatio memoriae voted against her by the Senate after her death. Several possibilities have been advanced without widespread acceptance. A portrait type that survives in at least three replicas and which can be referred to as the "Alesia type" may represent Livilla. The replicas show the head of a lady, with a hairstyle clearly from the Tiberian period. The physiognomy is close but not identical to portraits of Antonia Minor, Livilla's mother and some replicas seem to bear the marks of voluntary damage (that one would expect from a damnatio memoriae). For all these reasons, it has been proposed that these portraits are a representation of Livilla.

A cameo portrait of a lady with the silhouettes of two infants, has been tentatively identified as Livilla. Although it is possible that the seated woman on the right on the Great Cameo of France represents Livilla, it seems more likely that the female figure seated on the left and holding a roll represents Livilla, depicted there as the widowed wife of Drusus the Younger, seen just above her as one of the three heavenly imperial male figures.

== Cultural depictions ==
Livilla has been depicted in three television series about the period. In the 1968 British television series The Caesars she was portrayed by Suzan Farmer.

In the 1976 BBC TV series adaptation of I, Claudius she was played by Patricia Quinn. In that program she has an affair with Agrippa Postumus, but Livia persuades her to frame him for rape, leading to his exile. She murders Drusus with the help of Sejanus and also plots with him to murder Tiberius, but her mother finds the evidence and sends it to Tiberius via Claudius. She also believes Livilla is trying to murder her daughter for standing in her way. Livilla is then locked in a room by her mother, who says Livilla will not leave until she is dead.

In the 1985 mini-series A.D. she was played by Susan Sarandon.

== Bibliography ==
- Meise, Eckhard (1969). Untersuchungen zur Geschichte der Julisch-Claudischen Dynastie [Studies on the history of the Julio-Claudian dynasty]. Vestigia, vol. 10. Munich: Beck, on Livilla pp. 49–90.
