= Drusus Julius Caesar =

Roman politician, son of Emperor Tiberius (14 BC – 23 AD)

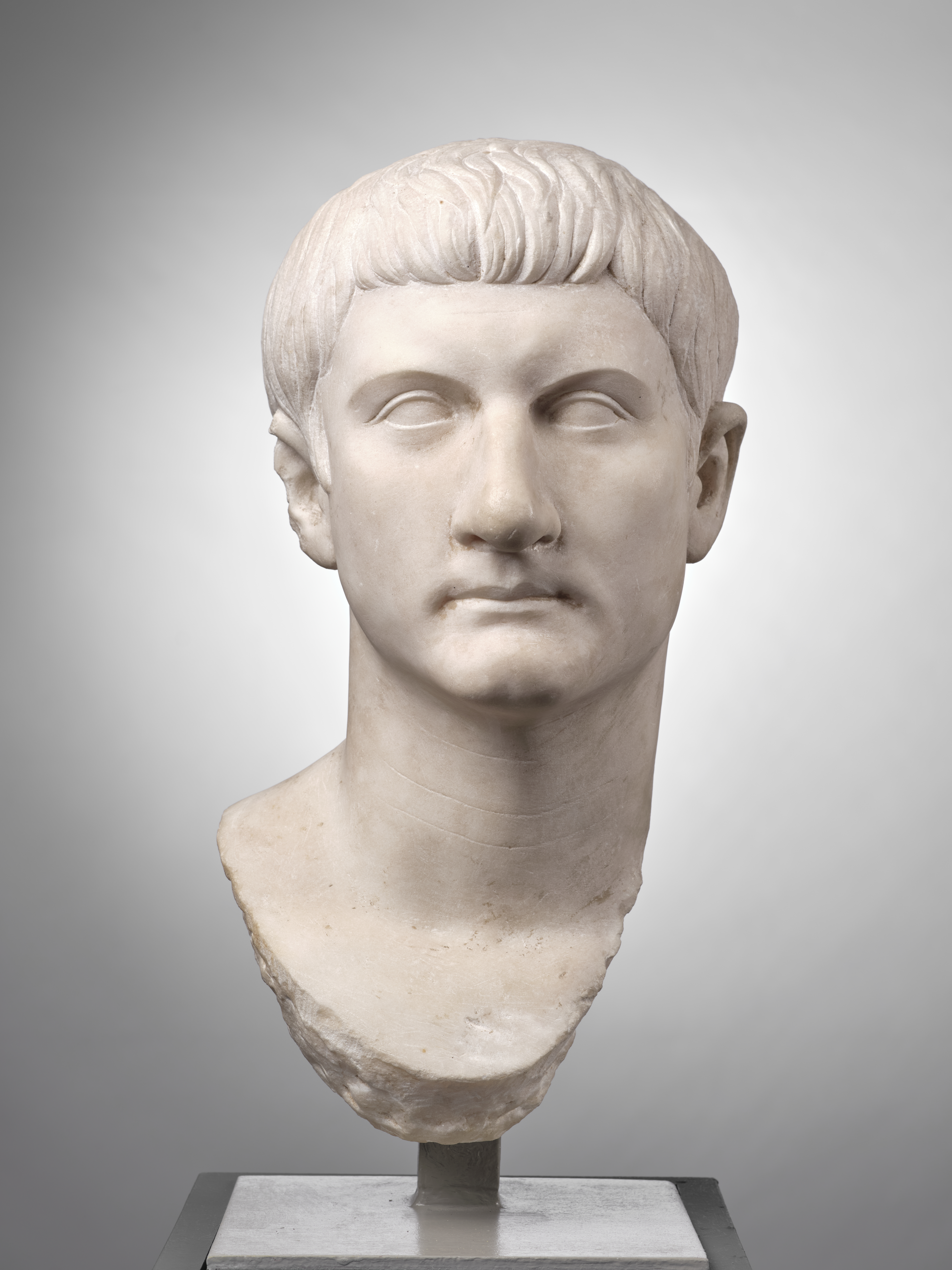
- Bust, Musée Saint-Raymond
- Born: Nero Claudius Drusus; 7 October c. 14 BC; Rome, Italy
- Died: 14 September AD 23 (aged approx. 35)
- Burial: Mausoleum of Augustus
- Spouse: Livilla
- Issue: Julia Livia; Tiberius Gemellus; Germanicus Gemellus
- Dynasty: Julio-Claudian
- Father: Tiberius
- Mother: Vipsania Agrippina
- Office: Quaestor (10 AD); Ornamenta Praetoria (11 AD); Consul (15, 21 AD); Tribunicia Potestas (from 22 AD)

Drusus Julius Caesar (7 October c. 14 BC – 14 September AD 23), also called Drusus the Younger, was the son of Emperor Tiberius, and heir to the Roman Empire following the death of his adopted brother Germanicus in AD 19.

Drusus was born at Rome to a prominent branch of the gens Claudia, the son of Tiberius and his first wife, Vipsania Agrippina. His name at birth was Nero Claudius Drusus after his paternal uncle Nero Claudius Drusus (Drusus the Elder). In AD 4, he assumed the name Julius Caesar following his father's adoption into the Julii by Augustus, and became Drusus Julius Caesar.

Drusus first entered politics with the office of quaestor in AD 10. His political career mirrored that of Germanicus, and he assumed all his offices at the same age as him. Following the model of Augustus, it was intended that the two would rule together. They were both popular, and many dedications have been found in their honor across Roman Italy. Cassius Dio calls him "Castor" in his Roman History, likening Drusus and Germanicus to the twins Castor and Pollux of Roman mythology.

Drusus died suddenly on 14 September 23 AD, at about 35 years old. Ancient historians including Tacitus and Suetonius claim that he was murdered amid a feud with the powerful Sejanus, the praetorian prefect of Rome. In their account, Sejanus had seduced Drusus's wife Livilla, and (with the help of a doctor) she poisoned Drusus. Despite the rumors, Tiberius did not suspect Sejanus, and the two remained friends until Sejanus's fall from grace in AD 31.

== Early life and family ==
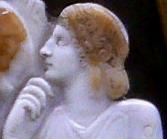
Great Cameo of France possibly depicting his wife Livilla

He was born around 14 BC in Rome with the name Nero Claudius Drusus. He is often referred to by historians as "Drusus II", "Drusus the Younger" or "Drusus Minor" to distinguish him from his paternal uncle, Nero Claudius Drusus, the younger brother of Tiberius after whom Drusus was named. Drusus was the maternal grandson of Marcus Vipsanius Agrippa, a close friend of Augustus, and his first wife Caecilia Attica.

As a member of the Julio-Claudian dynasty, he was a close relative of all five Julio-Claudian emperors. His father was emperor, and his adoptive grandfather was the founder of the Roman Empire, Augustus. On his mother's side, he was the cousin of Caligula, a paternal cousin of Claudius, and a first cousin once removed of Nero – all future emperors of Rome.

Before Tiberius, the heirs of Augustus were the sons of Julia the Elder and Marcus Agrippa, Gaius and Lucius Caesar, whom he adopted and made heir. They advanced through their careers at the same pace and were going to rule together; however, they died young, forcing Augustus to draw another line of succession. In AD 4, Augustus adopted Tiberius on condition that Tiberius adopt Germanicus. This made Tiberius the heir of Augustus, and Germanicus the heir of Tiberius. Like the sons of Agrippa, it was the intention of Augustus that Germanicus and Drusus would rule together. (Note: While this did place Germanicus ahead of Drusus in the line of succession, the adoption served to make Germanicus equal in rank to Drusus, and the two were meant to progress through their careers on a similar path until it was time for them to rule (Levick 1966, p. 232).)

Later that year, Drusus was married to his paternal cousin, Livilla, to bring him closer to the Julians. Tacitus says she was unattractive as a child, but grew up to be beautiful. Their daughter Julia Livia was born not long after the marriage, and they had twin sons: Tiberius Gemellus and Germanicus Gemellus in 19, the latter of whom died while still an infant in 23. The birth of his sons was commemorated on coins.

Just as Agrippa's sons were, Drusus was about the same age as Germanicus, and both of them also followed parallel careers. Drusus and Germanicus held all their offices at the same age, and progressed through the cursus honorum at the same pace. Both held the office of quaestor at the same age, both were exempted from holding the praetorship, they held their first and second consulships at the same age, and both were given proconsular imperium maius when they were sent to govern Germania and Illyricum respectively.

== Career ==
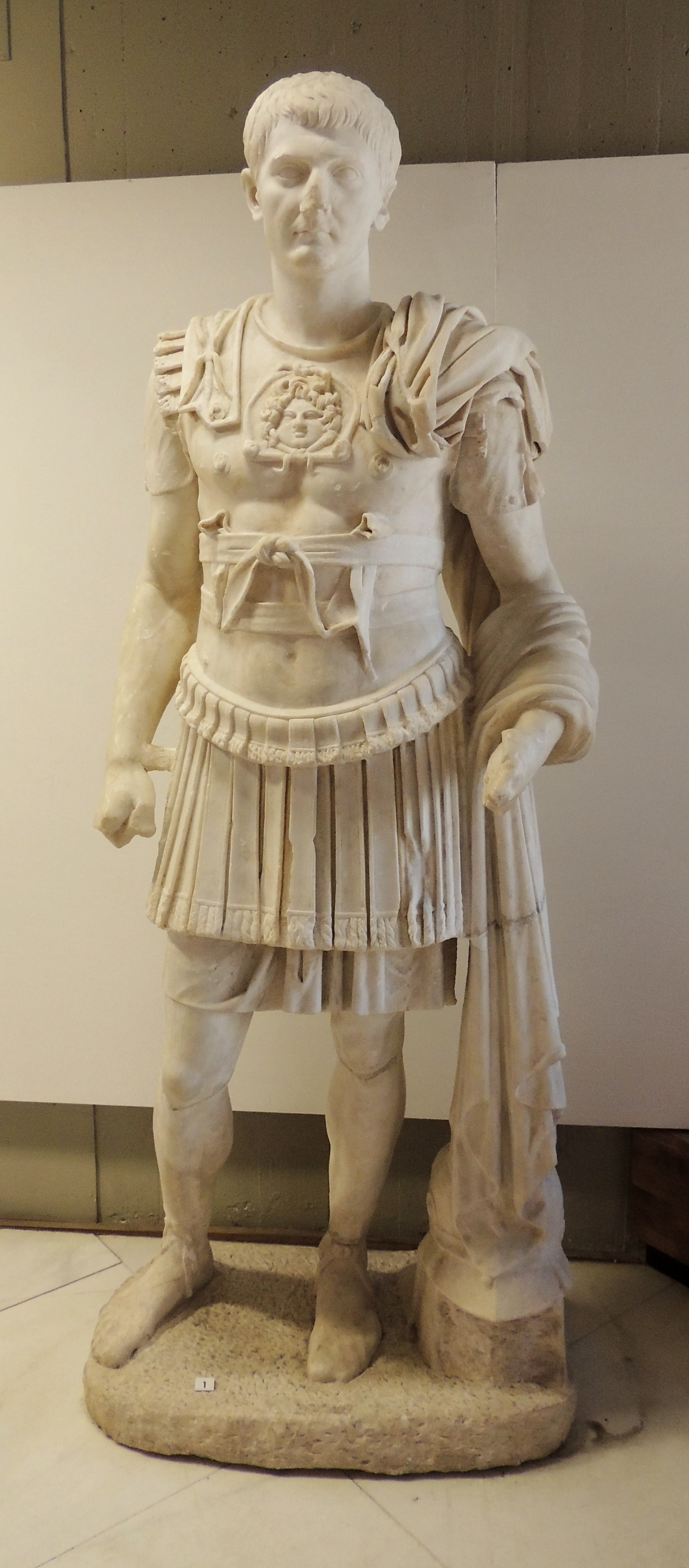
Statue of Drusus Julius Caesar from Sulcis (Sardinia, Italy)

Drusus' first office was that of quaestor in AD 10. Being politically inclined, he was made a permanent member of the committee Augustus had founded in AD 13 to draw up the Senate's daily business.

In August of AD 14 his adoptive grandfather Augustus died. In his honor, Drusus read a eulogy before the rostra at his funeral. The next month, on 17 September, the senate met to confirm his father as princeps. Among his first acts as emperor, Tiberius instituted the Sodales Augustales, a priesthood of the cult of Augustus which members of the imperial family, such as Drusus, joined. This was not his first religious post though, as he had been a pontifex since AD 7/8 - an important step to the prestigious pontifex maximus. Since 14 May AD 14, he was a member of the Fratres Arvales as well.

Drusus had little time to mourn the death of Augustus or celebrate the ascendance of his father Tiberius: the legions in the Rhine and Illyricum were in mutiny. They had not received the bonuses promised to them by Augustus, and when it became clear a response from Tiberius was not forthcoming, they revolted. On 17 or 18 September, Drusus was sent to deal with the troops in Illyricum, and a delegation was sent to confer proconsular imperium maius upon Germanicus, who dealt with the situation on the Rhine. Drusus did not require proconsular powers because he was consul designate.

=== Revolt in Pannonia ===
The three legions in Pannonia (VIII Augusta, XIX Hispana, and XV Apollinaris) were under the command of Junius Blaesus, who allowed his men a rest from military duties to mourn the death of Augustus. There was a breakdown in discipline, and the soldiers stopped obeying orders as a result. They soon became restless and lashed out against their officers, including Blaesus and a prefect named Aufidienus Rufus. Having been dispatched with two Praetorian cohorts, Drusus and Praetorian prefect Sejanus reached the Pannonian legions at Emona on 26 September.

The soldiers met with him upon his arrival and let Drusus into their entrenchments. The soldiers were rowdy, but as Tacitus says:

At last, in an interval of the uproar, Drusus read his father's letter, in which it was fully stated that he had a special care for the brave legions with which he had endured a number of campaigns; that, as soon as his mind had recovered from its grief, he would lay their demands before the Senators; that meanwhile he had sent his son to concede unhesitatingly what could be immediately granted, and that the rest must be reserved for the Senate, which ought to have a voice in showing either favour or severity.

— Tacitus, Annals 1.25

Their demands were: a discharge from military service after only sixteen years (down from twenty), a reward for service, an increase of pay to one denarius a day, and that the veterans not be detained under a standard. However, negotiations broke down and the soldiers began stoning members of Drusus' party. Next morning, a lunar eclipse before dawn convinced the soldiery that their mutiny was doomed, and order was restored by daybreak as a result. Drusus was allowed into the camp by Blaesus before an assembly of the troops in which Drusus commended the controlled behavior of the soldiery and promised to write a letter to his father addressing their demands. If Drusus' letter was dispatched on 28 September, it should have reached Rome by 3 or 4 October.

Having gained control of the soldiers, his next move, according to Tacitus, was executing the leaders of the mutiny. He sent out a search party into the surrounding forest to kill those leaders not present for the assembly. Having settled these matters, Drusus returned to Rome.

=== First consulship and command of Illyricum ===
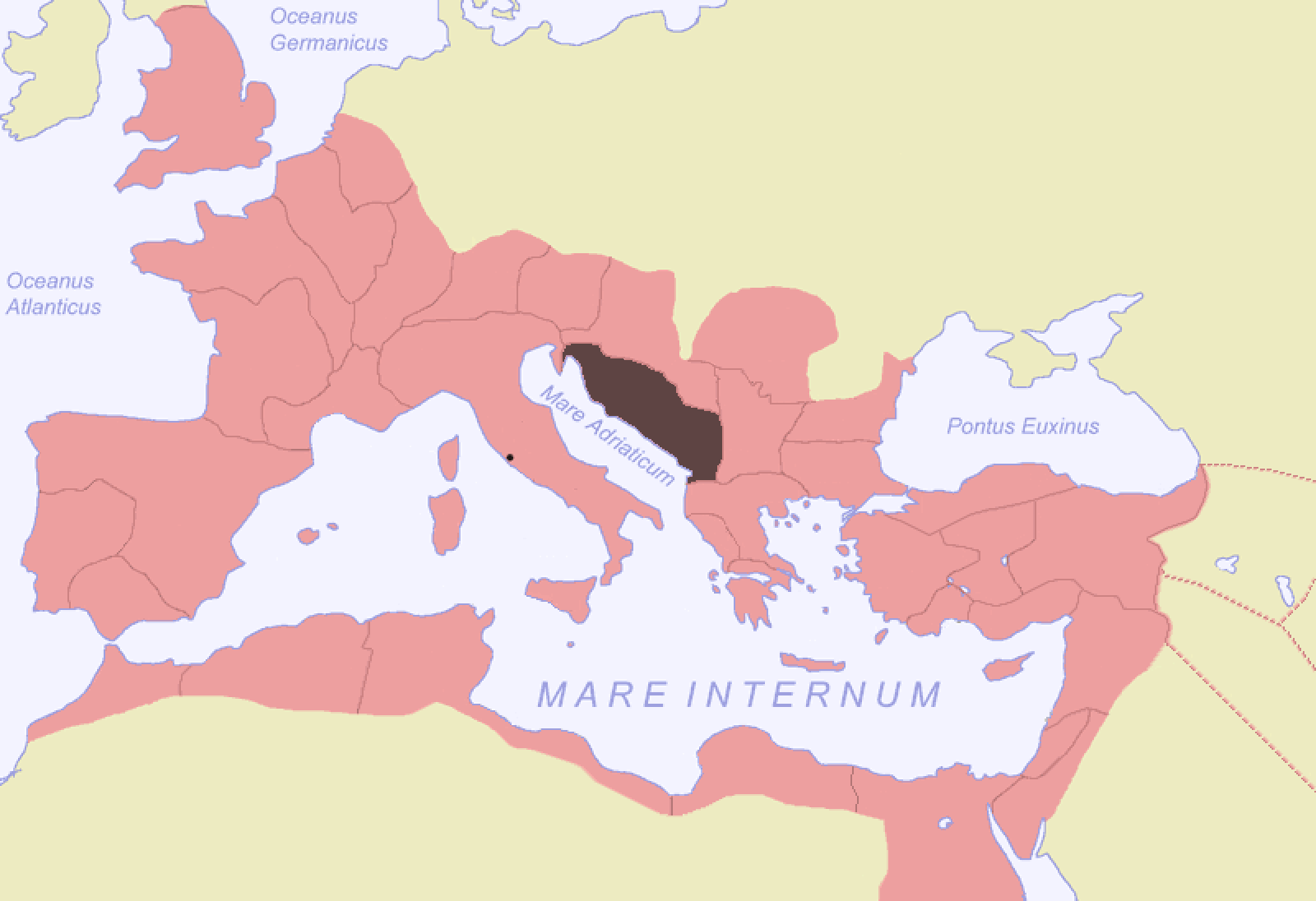
Province of Illyricum

In AD 15 he held the consulship alongside Gaius Norbanus Flaccus. It was this year that he hosted the gladiatorial games in his and Germanicus' name, which he enjoyed in such excess that it disturbed the other spectators. He reportedly carried out his duties as consul well, although he was prone to violence and earned the nickname "Castor" from fighting an equestrian. There was also an incident at a theater between the Praetorians and claqueurs ("actors") in which Drusus reportedly sided with the actors, preventing the Praetorian Guard from punishing unruly actors. In Annals 1.77, Tacitus says the unruly behavior of actors and the crowds were later addressed by the Senate which passed measures allowing the praetors to punish riotous spectators. Such were his excesses that Tiberius decided to make him governor of Illyricum the following year, both to give him experience in war and bolster his popularity with the troops - perhaps also to keep him away from the indulgences of city life.

For those reasons, Drusus was sent to Illyricum with proconsular imperium maius, and would be governor there from AD 17 to 20. Since Germanicus had left the Rhine in AD 16, the German tribes that formerly fought alongside each other against the Romans had turned on each other. The two major forces in the region, the Marcomanni under king Maroboduus and the Cherusci under Arminius clashed and, after an indecisive battle, Maroboduus withdrew to the heart of his kingdom in the forests of Bohemia. Before that, two tribes (the Semnones and Langobardi) had defected to Arminius.

Realizing his situation, Maroboduus requested Roman aid. It had been two years since the Marcommani refused to help the Romans against the forces of Arminius, and so Tiberius refused to send aid. Instead, Tiberius sent Drusus to further Roman interests at Maroboduus' expense as he knew the Marcomanni were vulnerable. During the summer of 18, Drusus received intelligence from a former captive of Maroboduus, Catualda, that Maroboduus was weak and that it was a good time to attack. Hence, Drusus led a powerful force into the heart of the Marcomanni, and stormed their royal stronghold. Maroboduus fled, but was forced to seek asylum in Rome, which Tiberius granted. Later, Catualda lost a battle against the Hermunduri, and he too was granted asylum. The Senate decreed that Drusus be given an ovation for his success, which he received on his return to Rome on 28 May 20.

=== Heir to the Principate ===
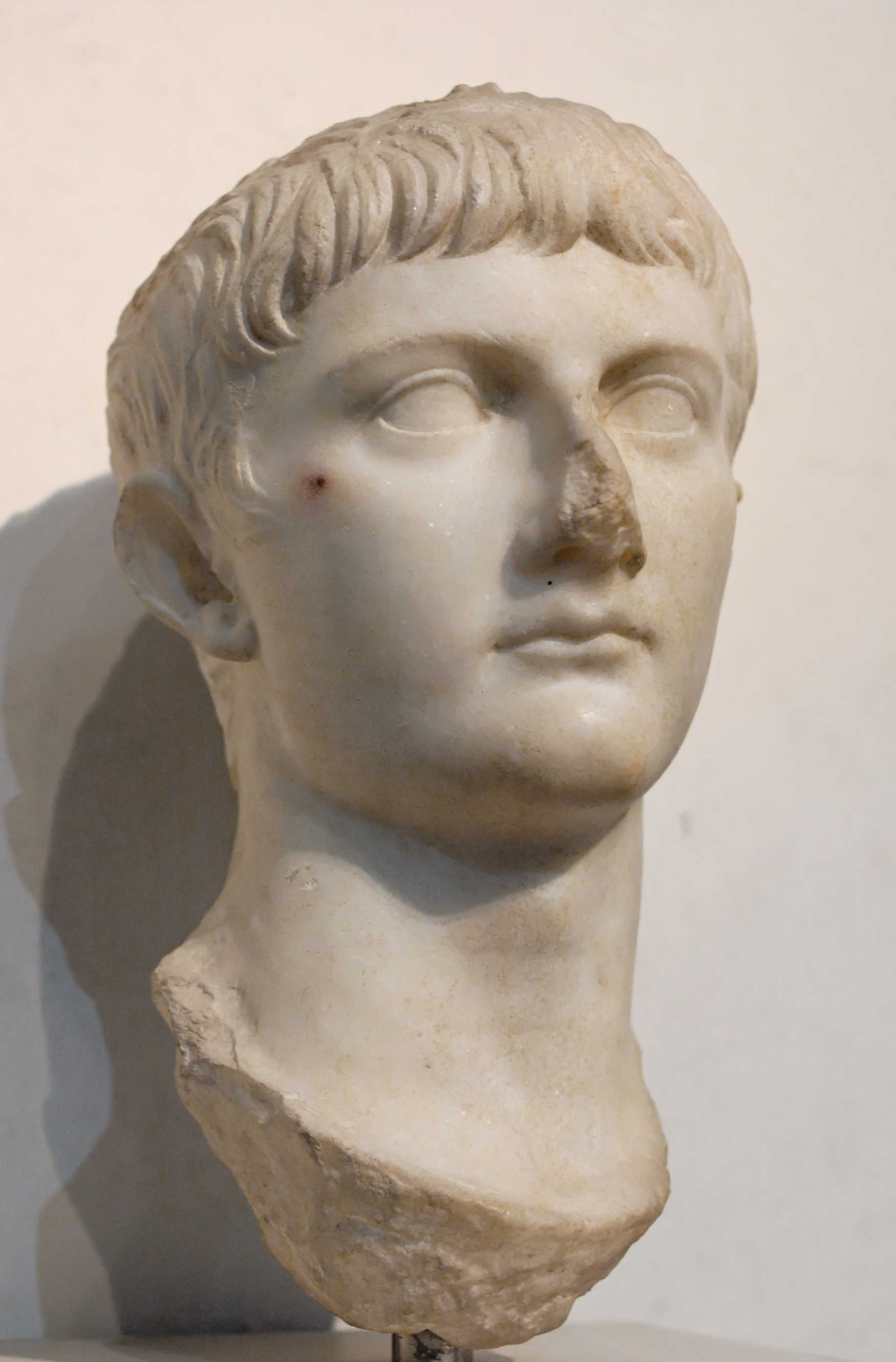
Bust of Germanicus

While Drusus was in Illyricum, his adopted brother Germanicus had died in Syria of illness or poison on 10 October AD 19. The death of Germanicus made Drusus the new heir, for which Germanicus' wife Agrippina suspected murder. She believed Tiberius had her husband murdered to allow Drusus to become his heir. Historian Barbara Levick says this is unlikely given the advancement of her son Nero's career the following year. (Note: In AD 20, Nero was brought into the Forum by Tiberius and Drusus to receive the toga virilis. He was also promised the quaestorship five years in advance, and was wed to Drusus' daughter Julia later that year (Levick 1999, p. 124).)

On the same day as Germanicus' death, Drusus' wife Livilla had given birth to twin sons, Tiberius Gemellus and Germanicus, whom he named after his adopted brother. Their birth was celebrated by his father who claimed that never before in the history of Rome had twins been born to a man as high in rank as Drusus, and the event was commemorated on the reverse of coins. Tiberius had hoped that Drusus would keep the imperial family together and entrusted him with the guardianship of Germanicus' sons, Nero and Drusus.

Drusus returned to Rome in December, and was present in 20 March when Agrippina arrived with Germanicus' ashes. He was also present for the trial of Gnaeus Calpurnius Piso, who was posthumously found guilty for the crime of maiestas (treason). On 16 December, his father gave a eulogy for Germanicus during a Senate meeting, and he gave a eulogy the next meeting. It was decided that their eulogies would both be inscribed in bronze: that of Tiberius for future generations, but the libellus (eulogy) of Drusus to demonstrate his devotion for his adopted brother in a show of pietas (piety).

Several changes affected Tiberius' reign following the death of Germanicus. In addition to losing his adoptive son and heir, Tiberius lost a friend: Gnaeus Piso, whose family had been close supporters of the principate since the early days of Augustus. The loss of Germanicus and the trial of Piso dealt a significant blow to Tiberius' popularity, and he came to resent the role of princeps.

=== Second consulship ===
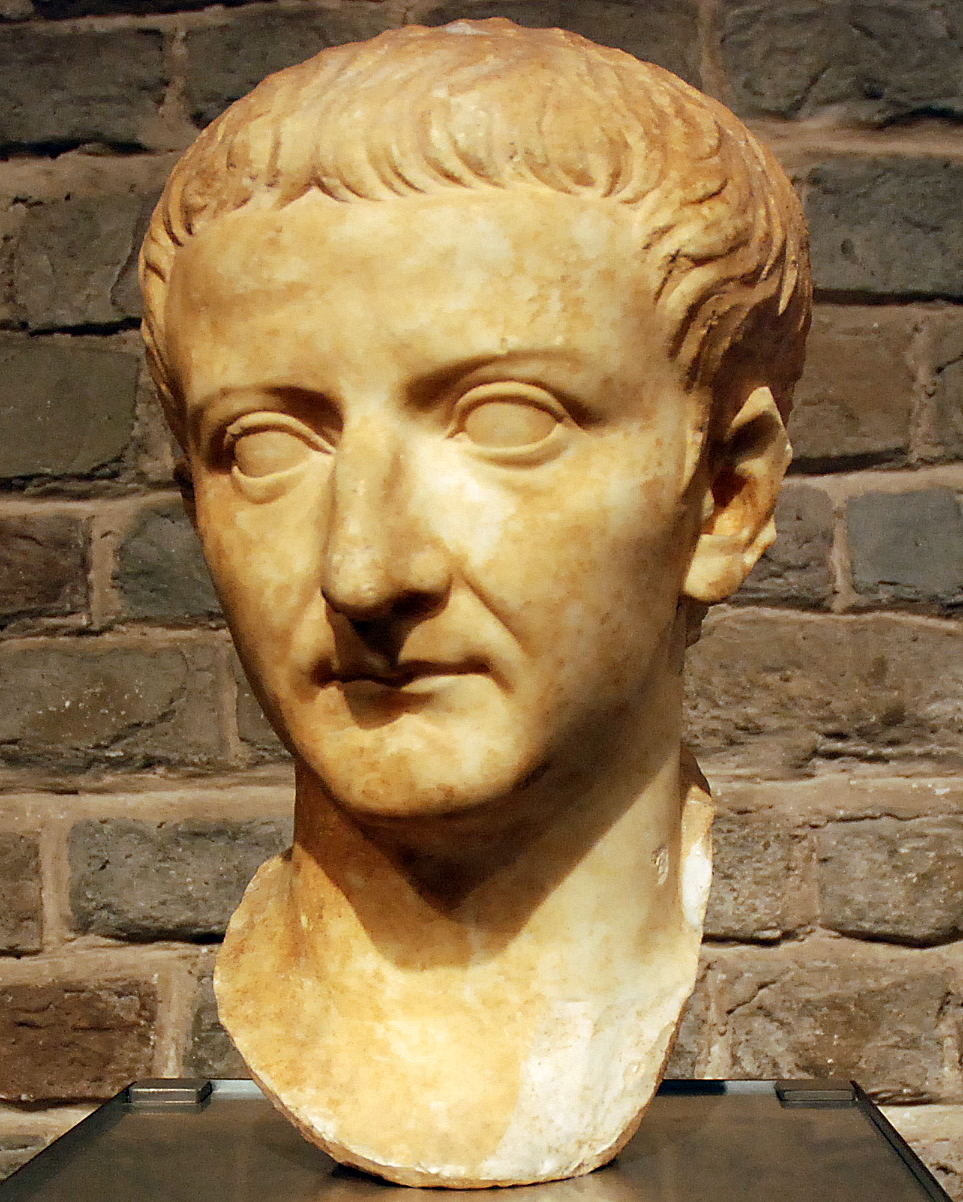
A bust of Tiberius kept in the Romano-Germanic museum in Cologne.

Maintaining the same interval of three years between Germanicus' and Drusus' first and second term as consul, Drusus was given the consulship again in AD 21, which he held with his father. The hardship of the last two years on his father had made him reclusive. For Tiberius, Drusus holding the consulship was a welcome sight, and with the state of his health, he retreated to Campania, leaving Drusus alone in carrying out the obligations of the consulship. Tiberius' retreat lasted about twenty months.

As consul he took part in a number of Senate debates. His first chance to shine in the Senate came in the dispute between ex-praetor Gnaeus Domitius Corbulo and Lucius Cornelius Sulla. Cornelius failed to give his seat to Corbulo at a gladiatorial show, and the incident sparked a debate between the rights of age and the defenders of tradition, in which Drusus argued a rapprochement. In another, it was proposed by Caecina Severus that the wives of governors be banned from joining their husbands in the provinces. Caecina delivered a speech in support of the bill, followed with speeches by both Valerius Messalinus and Drusus in opposition to it. The proposal was then abandoned, not because of the arguments made, but because of the intervention of an external force (the auctoritas of Drusus)--the same reason for the later repeal of the Oppian law (lex Oppia).

Drusus then settled an incident involving the abuse of the protection afforded by icons of the princeps, in which the emperor's images were being used to shield the guilty. Gaius Cestius Gallus brought a complaint into the Senate, and claimed he was being abused under this safeguard by Annia Rufilla. Drusus was soon brought in to weigh on the matter, for the Senate felt only a member of the imperial family could speak on such a delicate issue. At the request of many senators, Drusus had Rufilla arrested and imprisoned. Later, he was given credit for the condemnation of two Roman equites, Considius Aequus and Coelius Cursor, who had attacked the praetor, Magius Caecilianus, with false charges of maiestas. It is unlikely that he himself was responsible, for every verdict was given by the Senate with Tiberius' authority, but this did not prevent his popularity.

Meanwhile, there had been a rebellion in Gaul led by Sacrovir and Florus, Gauls with Roman citizenship, but the rebellion was settled by Gaius Silius (commander of the legions of the Lower Rhine) without the intervention of Tiberius or Drusus. After praising the loyalty of the legions in Gaul, Tiberius defended the statement he had made in 14, that neither he nor Drusus should have to "quit the capital" in response to every minor revolt in the empire.

Thus the consulship of Drusus was successful, but at the end of the year he fell ill. His illness prompted the equestrian, Clutorius Priscus, believing his life to be in jeopardy, to write his elegy. Priscus had previously written an elegy for Germanicus for which he was paid. He thought that he would be rewarded again, and so recited his elegy before an audience in preparation for Drusus' death. An unamused informer brought the matter before the Senate, and it was voted that he be executed. His execution was decreed and carried out without first consulting the emperor. This induced Tiberius to introduce a law where the Senate must wait 10 days after such condemnations before making such decrees public as to allow him to learn of their decisions first.

The following year, Tiberius asked the Senate of Rome to grant Drusus tribunicia potestas (tribunician power), which they responded to elatedly. The Senate decreed statues, shrines, temples, an arch, and other "customary honors" upon the princeps and his son. Thus in the spring of AD 22 Drusus received tribunicia potestas, a distinction no senator could then aspire to, as the honor was reserved exclusively for the emperor and his immediate successors. Only two men had been honored this way by Augustus—first Marcus Agrippa and then Tiberius himself—but Tiberius had never bestowed the power on Germanicus. It was then that Drusus shared the symbol of supreme power with his father.

=== Downfall ===
While it was officially Drusus who was the heir to Tiberius, in practice, it was the praetorian prefect Sejanus who was the second man in the empire. As early as AD 20, Sejanus had sought to strengthen his ties to the imperial family by betrothing his daughter Junilla to the son of Claudius, Claudius Drusus. At the time the girl was only 4 years old but the marriage was prevented when the boy accidentally died a few days later of asphyxiation. Regardless, his ambition to further expand his power was clear.

By AD 23, Sejanus had come to exert considerable influence over the emperor. Such was his relationship with the emperor that he was referred to by Tiberius as Socius Laborum ("my partner in my toils"). Sejanus' influence and position allowed him to be elevated to the rank of praetor, a position rarely attained by members of the equestrian order. His supporters in the Senate were given advancement in their offices, and statues were being erected in his honor, such as the one in the Theatre of Pompey.

By this time the enmity between Drusus and Sejanus had reached a critical point: Drusus had struck the prefect with his fist, and openly lamented that "a stranger was invited to assist in the government while the emperor's son was alive". According to Levick, there is nothing to suggest bad relations between the two before this point, especially not as far back as 14, during their expedition to Pannonia. She says, however, it may have been the clash between theatrical claqueurs and the Praetorian Guard in 15 that began the quarrel, but not enough is known to say for certain. Of more concern to Drusus was, perhaps, that in 20 his father mentioned Sejanus to the Senate in terms that treated him as his partner in power. For Drusus, the heir of that exact position, this was a legitimate cause for concern. At the time, Tiberius was in his sixties, so there was a realistic possibility of Drusus succeeding his father in the near future. In the account of Tacitus, Sejanus began plotting against Drusus in secrecy to secure his position.

After seducing Drusus' wife Livilla, Sejanus convinced her that he loved her and went as far as to divorce his own wife, Apicata. They involved Livilla's physician, Eudemus, whom they met in secret for some time. With the help of Livilla, Drusus was poisoned and died of what passed as natural causes. Cassius Dio says the actions of Sejanus were revealed in a letter by Apicata following his death in 31 October.

== Post mortem ==
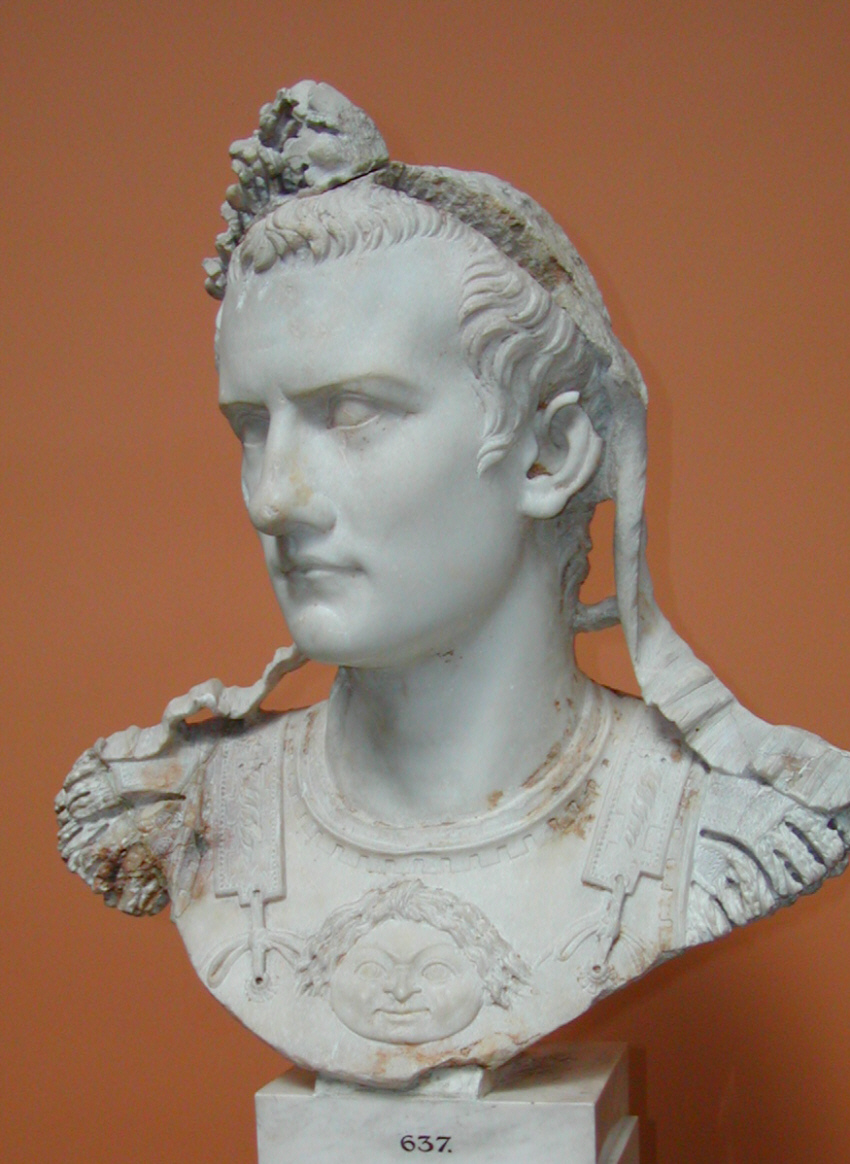
Reconstructed bust of the Emperor Gaius (Caligula)

Unlike Germanicus, Drusus was given a full funeral, and his body was interred in the Mausoleum of Augustus, alongside other deceased members of the imperial family. Like Germanicus, stories of poison abounded, with Sejanus rumoured to be the one responsible for his murder. Modern historians like Ronald Syme believe that he may simply have died of illness.

His death not only devastated Tiberius, but also challenged the future of the principate. Tiberius still trusted Sejanus, and had no suspicions about his involvement. Since Drusus' son was too young to rule alone, Tiberius adopted his grandchildren by Germanicus, Nero and Drusus, and recommended them to the Senate. Nero was given the office of quaestor five years in advance and was married to Julia Livia, the daughter of Drusus, to combine the families of both possible successors. However, neither would live to succeed Tiberius.

By AD 26, the emperor had withdrawn from politics altogether and moved to Capri, leaving the management of the empire to Sejanus, who then began eliminating other members of the imperial family. In AD 28/29, Nero was exiled to the island of Ponza as an enemy of the state, where he died in AD 33. Germanicus' son Drusus was imprisoned within the dungeon under the imperial palace on the Palatine Hill, where he starved to death not long after.

Sejanus remained powerful until his sudden downfall and summary execution on 18 October AD 31, the exact reasons for which remain unclear. On 26 October, just eight days after his death, his wife Apicata committed suicide. According to Cassius Dio, she left a message for the emperor: his son had been murdered by his wife Livilla and her lover, Sejanus. The story should be read with caution. Levick says that Sejanus must have murdered Drusus in self-defense because only Tiberius stood between the Praetorian Prefect and the end of his career at the hands of Drusus. Furthermore, he says it is even less likely that Livilla would have been complicit in the destruction of her family, the key to her children's future. Levick dismisses the accusation of Apicata as the revenge of a woman whose husband left her for another.

The deaths of Germanicus' oldest sons elevated his third son, Gaius Caesar (Caligula), to successor and he became princeps when Tiberius died in AD 37. Drusus' son Tiberius Gemellus was summoned to Capri by his grandfather Tiberius, where he and Gaius Caligula were made joint heirs. When Caligula assumed power, he made Gemellus his adopted son, but Caligula soon had Gemellus killed for plotting against him.

== Gallery ==
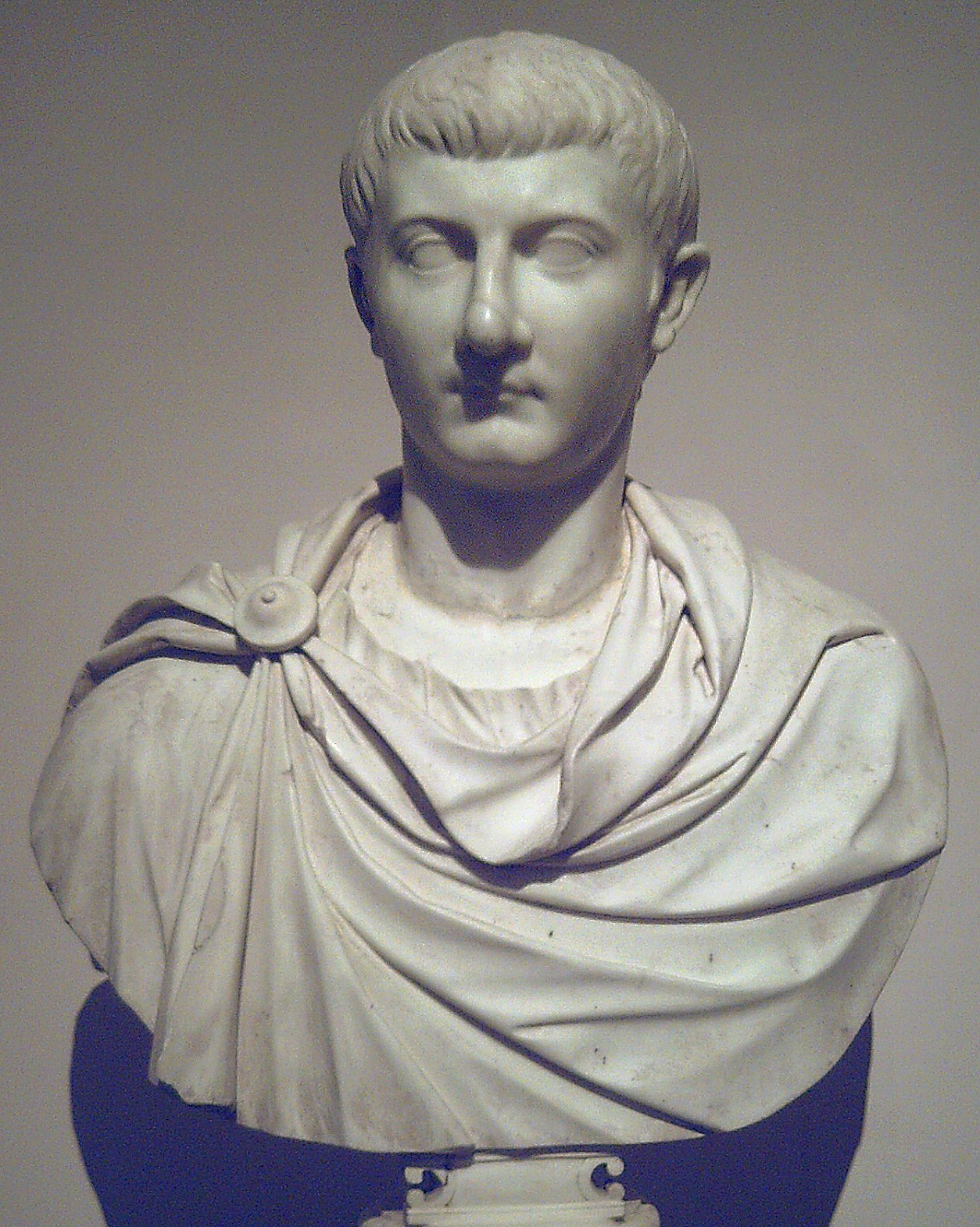
Bust of Drusus in Prado (Madrid).

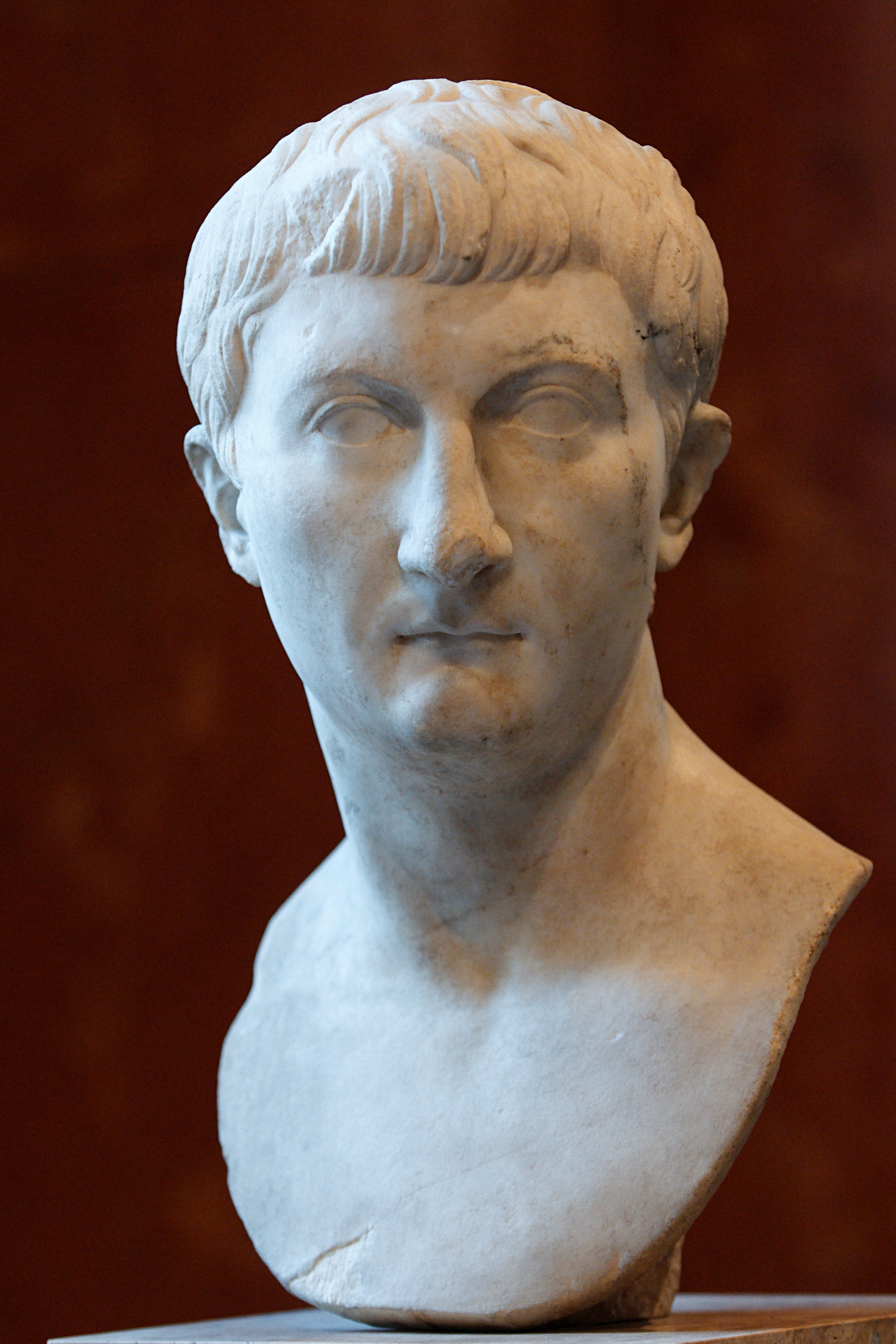
Bust of Drusus in the Louvre (Paris)

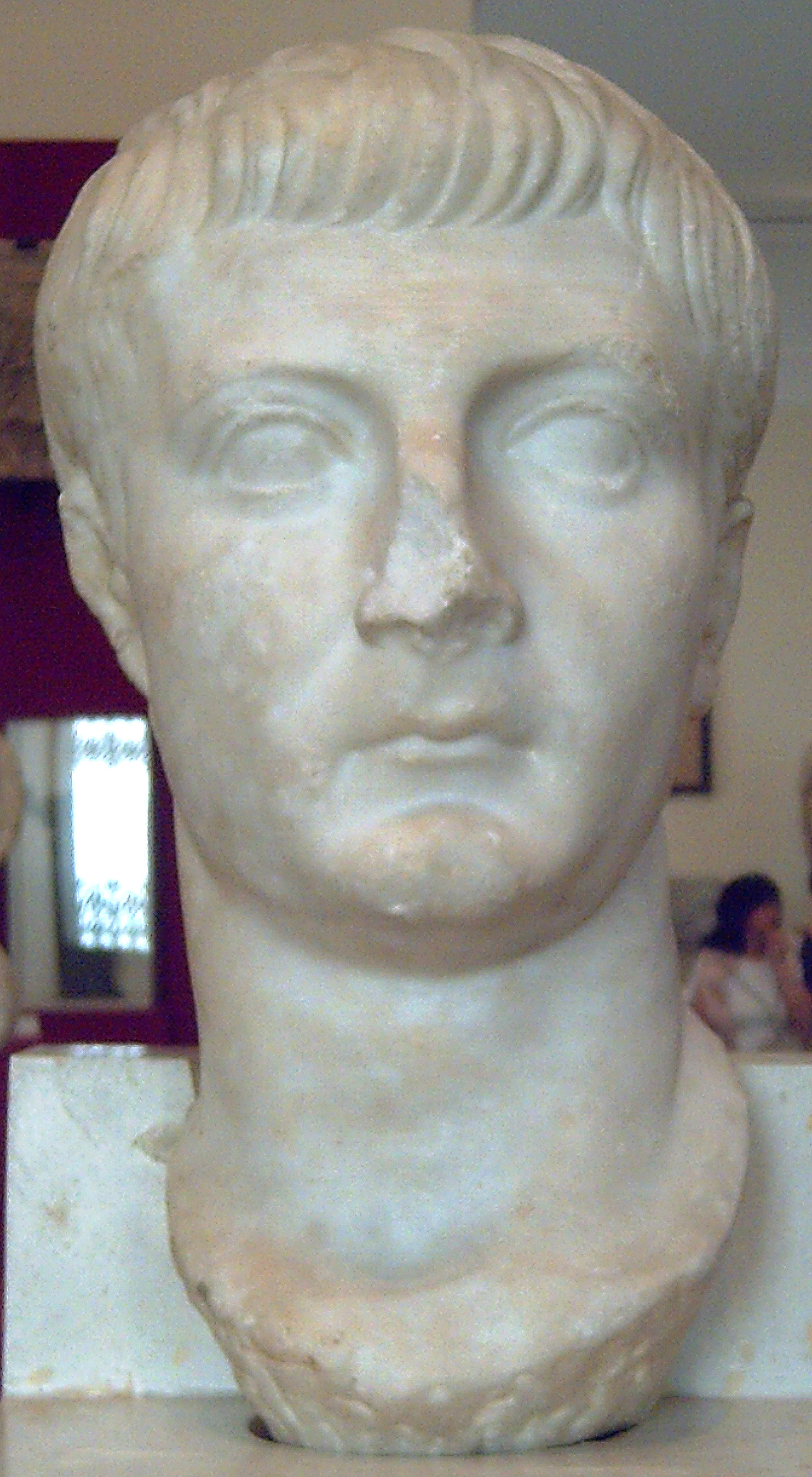
Bust of Drusus in the Museo Arqueológico Nacional de España

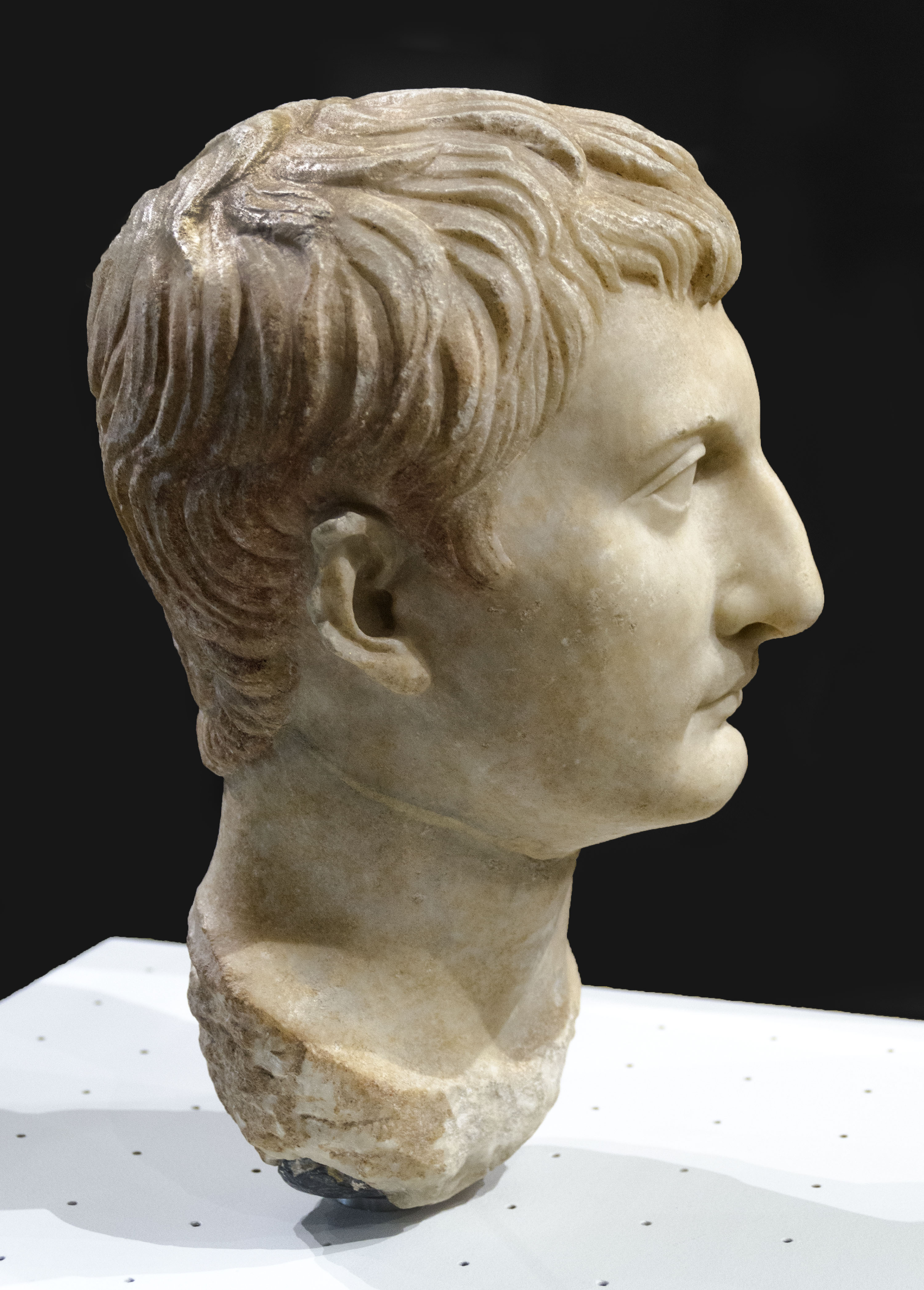
Bust of Drusus in the Archaeological and Ethnological Museum of Córdoba

== In popular culture ==
He features under the name Castor in the novel I, Claudius by Robert Graves, and in its BBC adaptation (in which he was played by Kevin McNally).

He was also portrayed in the 1968 TV series The Caesars by William Corderoy.

He is associated with the gourmand Apicius. Under Apicius' influence he disdained a certain vegetable of the cabbage family, earning a reprimand from Tiberius. Drusus is also recorded as using bitter almonds (five or six at a time) as a prophylactic against drunkenness.

== Ancestry ==
Ancestors of Drusus Julius Caesar

8. Tiberius Claudius Nero
4. Tiberius Claudius Nero
9. Unknown
2. Tiberius
10. Marcus Livius Drusus Claudianus
5. Livia Drusilla
11. Alfidia
1. Drusus Julius Caesar
12. Lucius Vipsanius Agrippa
6. Marcus Vipsanius Agrippa
13. Unknown
3. Vipsania Agrippina
14. Titus Pomponius Atticus
7. Caecilia Attica
15. Pilia

== See also ==
- Britannicus – son of Roman emperor Claudius who died before his father
- Caracalla – murdered and replaced by Praetorian prefect Macrinus in AD 217
- Fusu – heir apparent of the First Emperor of China who was forced to commit suicide after his father's death
- Romanos II – emperor of Byzantium who suddenly died at the age of 21

== Bibliography ==
=== Primary sources ===
- Cassius Dio, Roman History Book 57, English translation
- Plutarch, Symposiacs Book 1, English translation
- Suetonius, Lives of the Twelve Caesars, Life of Caligula, Latin text with English translation
- Suetonius, Lives of the Twelve Caesars, Life of Tiberius, Latin text with English translation
- Tacitus, Annals, I–VI, English translation

=== Secondary sources ===
- Adams, Geoff W. (2007), The Roman Emperor Gaius "Caligula" and His Hellenistic Aspirations, BrownWalker Press, ISBN 9781599424231
- Bingham, Sandra J. (1999) [1997], The praetorian guard in the political and social life of Julio-Claudian Rome, Ottawa: National Library of Canada, ISBN 0612271064, archived from the original (PDF) on 1 March 2017
- Burns, Jasper (2006), Great Women of Imperial Rome: Mothers and Wives of the Caesars, Routledge, ISBN 978-0415408974
- Levick, Barbara (1966), Drusus Caesar and the Adoptions of A.D. 4, Latomus, Société d'Études Latines de Bruxelles, pp. 227–244
- Levick, Barbara (1999), Tiberius the Politician, Routledge, ISBN 0-415-21753-9
- Lott, J. Bert (2012), Death and Dynasty in Early Imperial Rome: Key Sources, with Text, Translation, and Commentary, Cambridge University Press, ISBN 978-0-521-86044-4
- Milnor, Kristina (2005), Gender, Domesticity, and the Age of Augustus: Inventing Private Life, Oxford University Press, ISBN 978-0-19-928082-7
- Pettinger, Andrew (2012), The Republic in Danger: Drusus Libo and the Succession of Tiberius, Oxford University Press, ISBN 978-0-19-960174-5
- Powell, Lindsay (2015), Marcus Agrippa:Right-hand Man of Caesar Augustus, Pen & Sword Military, ISBN 9781848846173
- Rowe, Greg (2002), Princes and Political Cultures: The New Tiberian Senatorial Decress, University of Michigan Press, ISBN 0472112309
- Salisbury, Joyce E. (2001), Women in the ancient world, ABC-CLIO, ISBN 978-1-57607-092-5
- Scullard, H.H. (1982), From the Gracchi to Nero: A History of Rome 133 BC to AD 68 (fifth ed.), Routledge, ISBN 0-415-02527-3
- Seager, Robin (2005), Tiberius, Blackwell Publishing, ISBN 1-4051-1529-7
- Shotter, David (1992), Tiberius Caesar, London: Routledge, ISBN 978-0-203-62502-6
- Syme, Ronald (1989), The Augustan Aristocracy, Oxford University Press, ISBN 0-19-814731-7
- This article incorporates text from a publication now in the public domain: Smith, William, ed. (1873). "Drusus Caesar". Dictionary of Greek and Roman Biography and Mythology. Vol. 1. pp. 1086–1087.

Drusus Julius Caesar Julio-Claudian dynasty Born: 14 BC Died: 14 September 23
Political offices
| Preceded by Sextus Pompeius, Sextus Appuleius | Roman consul 15 with Gaius Norbanus Flaccus, followed by Marcus Junius Silanus as suffect | Succeeded by Sisenna Statilius Taurus, Lucius Scribonius Libo |
| Preceded by M. Valerius Messalla Barbatus, M. Aurelius Cotta Maximus Messalinus | Roman consul 21 with Tiberius Caesar Augustus IV | Succeeded by Mamercus Aemilius Scaurus, Gnaeus Tremellius as suffect consuls |
