= Nonia gens =

Ancient Roman family

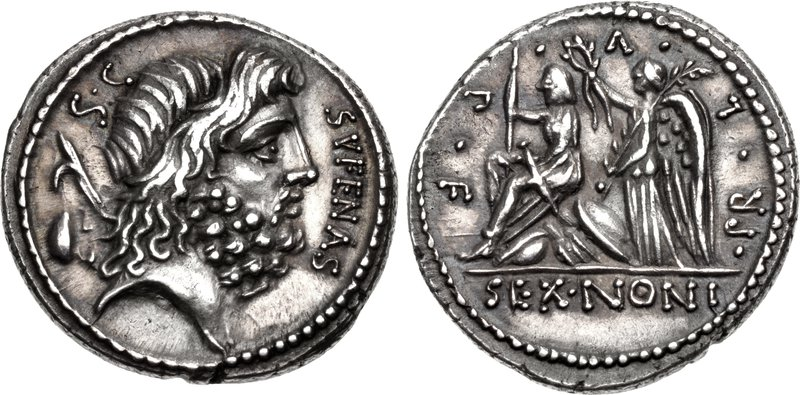
Denarius of Marcus Nonius Sufenas, 59 BC. Saturn is portrayed on the obverse while the reverse depicts Victoria crowning Roma. The legend "Sex(tus) Noni(us) Pr(aetor) L(udos) V(ictoriae) P(rimus) F(ecit)" tells that Sufenas' father, the praetor Sextus Nonius established the Ludi Victoriae Sullanae in 81 BC.

The gens Nonia was a plebeian family at ancient Rome. Its members first appear in history toward the end of the Republic. The first of the Nonii to obtain the consulship was Lucius Nonius Asprenas in 36 BC. From then until the end of the fourth century, they regularly held the highest offices of the Roman state.

== Origin ==
The nomen Nonius is a patronymic surname, based on the praenomen Nonus, presumably belonging to an ancestor of the gens. The name is undoubtedly Latin, although the first of the Nonii to rise to prominence at Rome is said to have come from Picenum. Another branch of the family seems to have come from Aesernia.

== Praenomina ==
The chief praenomina of the Nonii were Lucius, Marcus, and Publius, all of which were used by the Nonii Asprenates, while the Quinctiliani used Lucius and Sextus, the latter coming from the Quinctilii, in the maternal line. The Nonii Galli used Marcus and Gaius, while the Macrini used Marcus and Publius. Other praenomina occasionally appear among Nonii whose connection to the main branches of the family, if any, is unknown, including Aulus, Gnaeus, and Quintus. Titus is given in some sources as the earliest ancestor of the Asprenates, solely from the filiation of the consul of 36 BC, but this is very uncertain, and the name is not otherwise found among the Nonii.

== Branches and cognomina ==
The main surnames of the Nonii were Asprenas, Balbus, Gallus, Quinctilianus, and Sufenas, of which only the last two appear on coins. A few of the Nonii occur without surnames. Asprenas, the name of the most prominent family of the Nonii, and Sufenas (Note: Also found as Suffenas.) belong to a class of cognomen apparently derived from the names of towns that can no longer be identified. Balbus was a common surname, originally given to someone with a pronounced stammer, while Gallus could signify either a Gaul or a cockerel.

The Nonii Asprenates emerge into history in the time of Caesar. They remained prominent through the middle of the second century, and the Quinctiliani appear to have constituted a cadet branch of this family. The Nonii Galli were the next family to appear, coming from the town of Aesernia, in the Samnite country, where a Latin colony had been sent at the end of the Third Samnite War.

Beginning in the mid-second century there is a family with the surname Macrinus, a diminutive of the cognomen Macro, a Greek name meaning "great" or "large". This family distinguished itself through military and civil service, and evidently obtained patrician rank, as Marcus Nonius Arrius Paulinus Aper was advanced to the office of praetor without having first served as tribune of the plebs.

== Members ==
This list includes abbreviated praenomina. For an explanation of this practice, see filiation.

=== Early Nonii ===
- Aulus Nonius, an opponent of Saturninus and Glaucia, by whom he was murdered in 100 BC, when Nonius was a candidate for tribune of the plebs.
- Nonius, a friend of Gaius Flavius Fimbria, who called upon his soldiers to swear to support him against Sulla in 84 BC. Notwithstanding their friendship, Nonius refused the oath.
- Nonius, a centurion, was murdered by his soldiers in 41 BC, while attempting to quell a mutiny on the Campus Martius in 41 BC.
- Nonius, placed in charge of one of the gates of Rome during the Perusine War, permitted Lucius Antonius to enter the city.

=== Nonii Sufenates ===
- Nonius (Sufenas), the brother-in-law of the dictator Sulla, is presumed to have married the dictator's sister Cornelia. Either he or his son Sextus is likely the same Nonius who betrayed Fimbria for Sulla in 84 BC.
- Sextus Nonius Sufenas, nephew of Sulla, and praetor in 81 BC, established the Ludi Victoriae Sullanae, the games in honour of the dictator's victory. He may have married an older sister of Gnaeus Pompeius Magnus.
- Sextus Nonius Sex. f. Sufenas, possibly the nephew of Pompey named Sextus, mentioned by Plutarch, in which case he was the son of Sextus Nonius, the praetor of 81 BC, and Pompeia. Either he or his younger brother, Marcus, may have been the Nonius insulted by Catullus.
- Marcus Nonius Sex. f. Sufenas, triumvir monetalis in 59 BC. As tribune of the plebs in 56, with two of his colleagues, he prevented the comitia from being held, and new consuls elected. He was tried for this action, but acquitted. He was praetor circa 52, and afterward governor of one of the eastern provinces, perhaps Crete and Cyrenaica or Macedonia. He, or possibly his brother, Sextus, is probably the same man as the Nonius who was called by Catullus "struma", a tumor, when he served as one of the curule magistrates, possibly aedile, around 55 BC. He proved himself unfit for his position, causing the poet to remark sarcastically, quid est, Catulle, quid moraris emori? Sella in curuli struma Nonius sedet. (Note: "Why do you wait to die, O Catullus? Nonius the tumor sits in the curule chair!")
- Nonia Sex. f., daughter of Sextus Nonius Sufenas, the praetor of 81 BC, and Pompeia, married a Marcus Anneius of Carseoli, and had at a son by him who was adopted by one of her brothers, probably Sextus.
- Sextus Nonius (Sex. f. Sex. n.) Sufenas Anneianus, born Marcus Anneius Carseolanus, the son of Marcus Anneius and Nonia, was adopted by one of his uncles, presumably Sextus.
- Nonius, the son of "struma", was a senator who said to possess an opal worth two million sesterces, an immense value. According to Pliny, he was proscribed in 43 BC by the triumvir Antonius on account of his treasure.
- Nonia, daughter of the proscribed senator Nonius, married Marcus Servilius, and was the mother of Marcus Servilius Nonianus.

=== Nonii Asprenates ===
- Lucius Nonius T.? f. Asprenas, father of the consul of 36 BC.
- Lucius Nonius L. f. T.? n. Asprenas, as proconsul in 46 BC, during the Civil War, he served under Caesar in Africa and Spain. He was consul suffectus in 36.
- Nonia L. f. Polla, married Lucius Volusius Saturninus, consul suffectus in 12 BC.
- Nonius Asprenas, as tribune of the plebs in 44 BC, he tried to prevent Publius Cornelius Dolabella from receiving the province of Asia after the murder of Caesar by fabricating unfavourable omens.
- Lucius Nonius L. f. L. n. Asprenas, an intimate friend of Augustus, was accused of poisoning the guests at a banquet he gave, and acquitted largely through the emperor's influence.
- Lucius Nonius L. f. L. n. Asprenas, consul in AD 6. In AD 9, he was a legate under his uncle, Publius Quinctilius Varus, who was slain in the Battle of Teutoburg Forest. Asprenas was able to prevent the complete destruction of the army following his uncle's death. He was proconsul of Africa in AD 14. He married Calpurnia.
- Marcus Nonius Asprenas, father of the consul of AD 38.
- Lucius Nonius L. f. L. n. Asprenas, consul suffectus in AD 29.
- Nonius Asprenas Calpurnius Serranus, brother of Lucius, the consul of AD 29.
- Publius Nonius M. f. Asprenas Calpurnius Serranus, consul in AD 38. He was slain by the bodyguard of Caligula in the hunt for their master's murderers in 41, although his garments were only stained with the blood of a sacrifice he had offered in a priestly capacity.
- Publius Nonius Asprenas, an orator frequently mentioned by Seneca in his Controversiae.
- Lucius Nonius Asprenas, another orator frequently mentioned in Seneca's Controversiae.
- Publius Nonius Asprenas Caesianus, known from an inscription mentioning his slave, Olympus Asprenatis, and his wife.
- Gaius Nonius Asprenas, senator and father of Lucius Nonius Calpurnius Torquatus Asprenas.
- Lucius Nonius L. f. L. n. Calpurnius Torquatus Asprenas, consul suffectus between AD 72 and 74.
- Lucius Nonius L. f. L. n. Calpurnius Torquatus Asprenas, consul in AD 94, and again in 128.
- Nonia L. f. L. n. Torquata, married Quintus Volusius Saturninus.
- Lucius Nonius Calpurnius Torquatus Asprenas, consul suffectus in September of an uncertain year, circa AD 151.

=== Nonii Quinctiliani ===
- Sextus Nonius L. f. L. n. Quinctilianus, probably the second son of Lucius Nonius Asprenas, the friend of Augustus, was consul in AD 8.
- Sextus Nonius Sex. f. L. n. Quinctilianus, consul suffectus in AD 38.
- Lucius Nonius Sex. f. L. n. Quinctilianus, son of the consul of AD 8, and brother of the consul of 38.
- Lucius Nonius L. f. Sex. n. Quintilianus, grandson of the consul of AD 8, was an augur, and one of the Salii Palatinii. He died at the age of twenty-four.

=== Nonii Galli ===
- Marcus Nonius (Gallus), great-grandfather of the general Aeserninus.
- Gaius Nonius M. f. (Gallus), grandfather of the general Aeserninus.
- Gaius Nonius C. f. M. n. (Gallus), one of the quattuorviri quinquennalis, the municipal officials of Aesernia in Samnium.
- Marcus Nonius C. f. C. n. Gallus Aeserninus, sent against the Treveri and Germani, whom he defeated in 29 BC. He was acclaimed Imperator by his soldiers. He might be the same Nonius who served under Gnaeus Pompeius Magnus during the Civil War.

=== Nonii Balbi ===
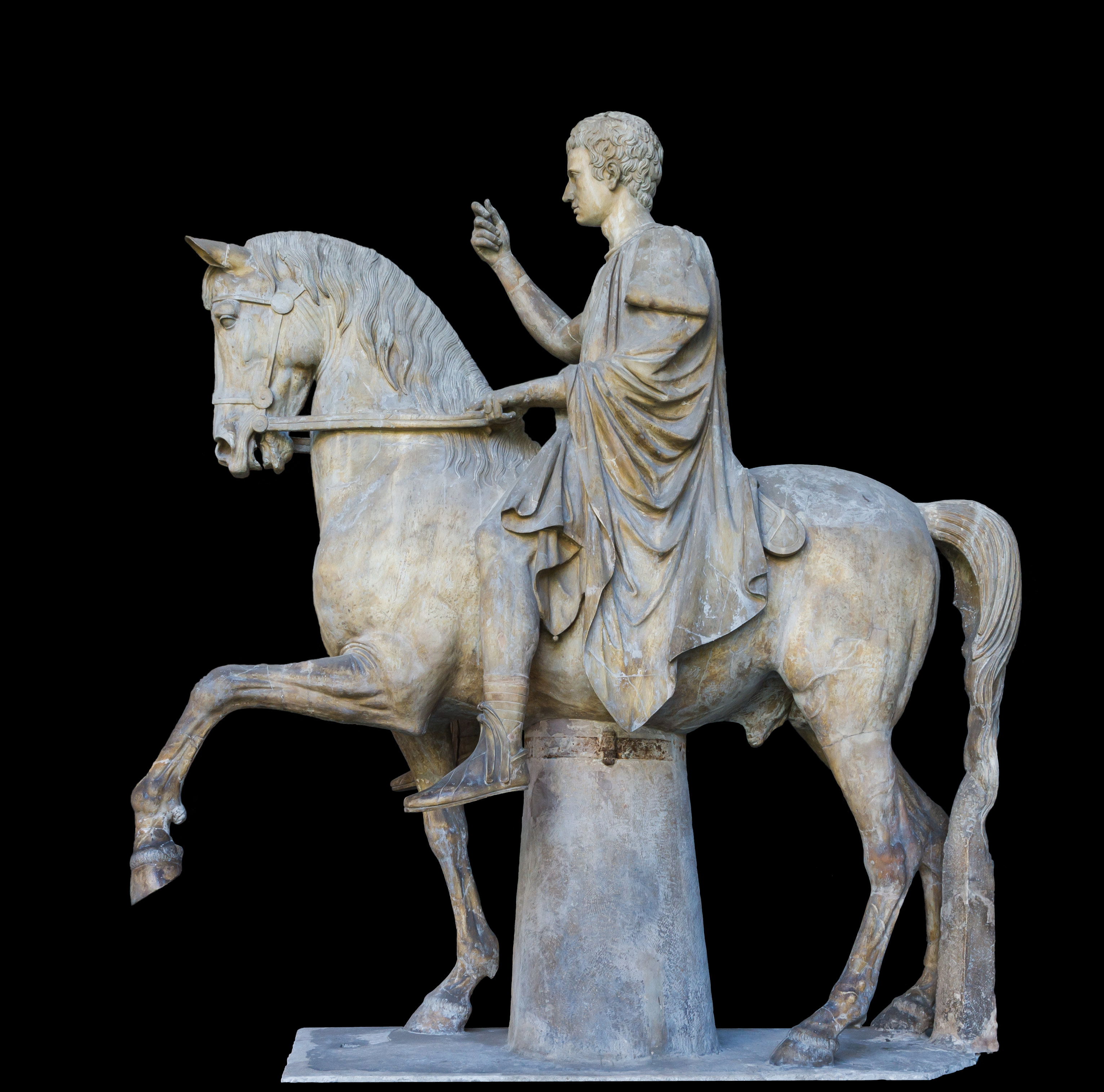
Equestrian statue of Marcus Nonius M. f. M. n. Balbus, c. AD 50. Originally located on the forum or near the basilica of Herculaneum, it is now on display in the National Archaeological Museum of Naples.

- Marcus Nonius Balbus, married Viciria Archais, and was the father of Marcus Nonius Balbus, proconsul of Crete.
- Marcus Nonius M. f. Balbus, tribune of the plebs in 32 BC, vetoed a motion devised by the consul Gaius Sosius, one of Marc Antony's supporters, which was aimed at Octavian. He subsequently became praetor, then proconsul of Crete. He married Volasennia Tertia, and was a benefector of Herculaneum.

=== Nonii Macrini ===
- Marcus Nonius Macrinus, father of the quaestor Macrinus.
- Publius Nonius M. f. Macrinus, quaestor in AD 138.
- Marcus Nonius M. f. Macrinus, one of the quindecimviri sacris faciundis, was consul in AD 154, and afterward legate pro praetore of Pannonia Superior and proconsul of Asia. He married Arria. This Macrinus is supposed to have been one of the historical figures who inspired the character of "Maximus Decimus Meridius" in the film Gladiator.
- Marcus Nonius M. f. M. n. Arrius Mucianus, was, like his father and brother, one of the quindecimviri sacris faciundis. He was consul in AD 201.
- Marcus Nonius M. f. M. n. Arrius Paulinus Aper, one of the quindecimviri sacris faciundis, like his father and brother. He was urban prefect, but it is not clear whether he ever became consul. His wife was (Roscia?) Pacula.
- Nonia Arria Hermionilla, the wife of Sextus Valerius Poplicola Vettilianus, an eques, and grandmother of Marcus Annius Valerius Catullus.

=== Others ===
- Nonia C. f., named in an inscription found on a cippus, or pedestal, in the garden of Titianus.
- Nonia Antistia, named in an inscription found on a pipe.
- Nonia Maxima, named in an inscription found on a pipe.
- Gaius Nonius C. f. Proculus, consul suffectus in an uncertain year.
- Gnaeus Nonius, an eques who was discovered wearing a sword while in a crowd around the emperor Claudius, in AD 47.
- Nonius Receptus, a centurion in the twenty-second legion, who remained loyal to the emperor Galba in AD 69. He was imprisoned and put to death by his colleagues, who had taken the side of Vitellius.
- Nonius Attianus, one of the delatores in the reign of Nero, was punished in AD 70, following the accession of Vespasian.
- Publius Nonius P. l. Olympus Asprenatus, freedman of Publius Nonius Asprenas Caesianus.
- Nonia P. l. Ionica, a freedwoman, was the wife of Olympus Asprenatus.
- Nonius Celer, helped arrange the marriage of Quintilianus, a friend of Pliny the Younger.
- Marcus Nonius M. f. Mucianus Publius Delphius Peregrinus, consul suffectus in October of AD 138. It is uncertain whether he was related to the Nonii Macrini, among whom there was Marcus Nonius Arrius Mucianus; a Publius Nonius Macrinus was quaestor in the year of Peregrinus' consulship.
- Quintus Nonius Sosius Priscus, consul in AD 149.
- Nonius Bassus, consul suffectus in an uncertain year.
- Lucius Nonius Bassus, prefect of the Cohors I Brittonum milliaria under Antoninus Pius.
- Nonius Gracchus, one of the prominent Romans whom Septimius Severus had put to death without cause.
- Nonia Celsa, wife of the emperor Macrinus, and mother of Diadumenian.
- Nonius Philippus, legatus pro praetore of Britannia Inferior in AD 242.
- Nonius Gratilianus, a minor Roman noble, was chosen to join the collegium of Beneventum in AD 257.
- Nonius Paternus, consul circa AD 279, and perhaps praefectus urbi in 281.
- Nonius, name of a possible usurper attested from coins dated to around 350, but who escaped any literary mention. Previously he was identified with Regalianus, but this is no longer accepted.
- Nonius Atticus, consul in AD 397.
- Nonius Marcellus, a Latin grammarian of uncertain date, (Note: He may have lived at any time from the third to the fifth century, as nothing can be deduced from his style, but he mentions Apuleius and frequently borrows from Aulus Gellius, and he is quoted on multiple occasions by Priscian.) and the author of an important treatise entitled De Compendiosa Doctrina per Litteras ad Filium, also known as De Proprietate Sermonis. The work is itself highly disorganized, but it contains numerous quotations from notable authors whose own works have been lost.

== See also ==
- List of Roman gentes

== Bibliography ==
- Gaius Julius Caesar (attributed), De Bello Hispaniensis (On the War in Spain).
- Aulus Hirtius (attributed), De Bello Africo (On the African War).
- Gaius Valerius Catullus Carmina.
- Titus Livius (Livy), History of Rome.
- Marcus Velleius Paterculus, Compendium of Roman History.
- Lucius Annaeus Seneca (Seneca the Elder), Controversiae.
- Gaius Plinius Secundus (Pliny the Elder), Naturalis Historia (Natural History).
- Flavius Josephus, Antiquitates Judaïcae (Antiquities of the Jews).
- Marcus Fabius Quintilianus (Quintilian), Institutio Oratoria (Institutes of Oratory).
- Sextus Julius Frontinus, De Aquaeductu (On Aqueducts).
- Gaius Plinius Caecilius Secundus (Pliny the Younger), Epistulae (Letters).
- Publius Cornelius Tacitus, Annales, Historiae.
- Plutarchus, Lives of the Noble Greeks and Romans.
- Gaius Suetonius Tranquillus, De Vita Caesarum (Lives of the Caesars, or The Twelve Caesars).
- Appianus Alexandrinus (Appian), Bellum Civile (The Civil War), Bella Mithridatica (The Mithridatic Wars).
- Lucius Cassius Dio Cocceianus (Cassius Dio), Roman History.
- Aelius Lampridius, Aelius Spartianus, Flavius Vopiscus, Julius Capitolinus, Trebellius Pollio, and Vulcatius Gallicanus, Historia Augusta (Augustan History).
- Dictionary of Greek and Roman Biography and Mythology, William Smith, ed., Little, Brown and Company, Boston (1849).
- Dictionary of Greek and Roman Geography, William Smith, ed., Little, Brown and Company, Boston (1854).
- Paul von Rohden, Elimar Klebs, & Hermann Dessau, Prosopographia Imperii Romani (The Prosopography of the Roman Empire, abbreviated PIR), Berlin (1898).
- Ronald Syme, The Augustan Aristocracy, Clarendon Press (1986).
- T. Robert S. Broughton, The Magistrates of the Roman Republic, American Philological Association (1952).
- Ronald Syme, "The Historian Servilius Nonianus", in Hermes, 92 (1964), pp. 408-424
- Michael Crawford, Roman Republican Coinage, Cambridge University Press (1974, 2001).
- Anthony A. Barrett, Caligula: The Corruption of Power, Yale University Press (2002), ISBN 058546488X.
- Christophe Badel, La noblesse de l'Empire romain: les masques et la vertu, Champ Vallon (2005).
- Oxford Encyclopedia of Ancient Greece and Rome, Michael Gagarin, ed., Oxford University Press (2009).
