= Lucius Nonius Asprenas =

Lucius Nonius Asprenas may refer to:

- Lucius Nonius Asprenas (consul 36 BC), Roman politician and general
- Lucius Nonius Asprenas (suspected poisoner), Roman senator under Augustus
- Lucius Nonius Asprenas (consul 6), son of the senator
- Lucius Nonius Asprenas (consul 29), older son of the consul AD 6
- Nonius Asprenas Calpurnius Torquatus, younger son of the consul AD 6
- Lucius Nonius Calpurnius Torquatus Asprenas (suffect consul), suffect consul circa AD 71
- Lucius Nonius Calpurnius Torquatus Asprenas (fl. 1st century – 2nd century AD), son of the suffect consul circa AD 71, himself consul AD 94 and AD 128
