= Sour El-Ghozlane =

Sour El-Ghizlane سور الغزلان
- Commune and town
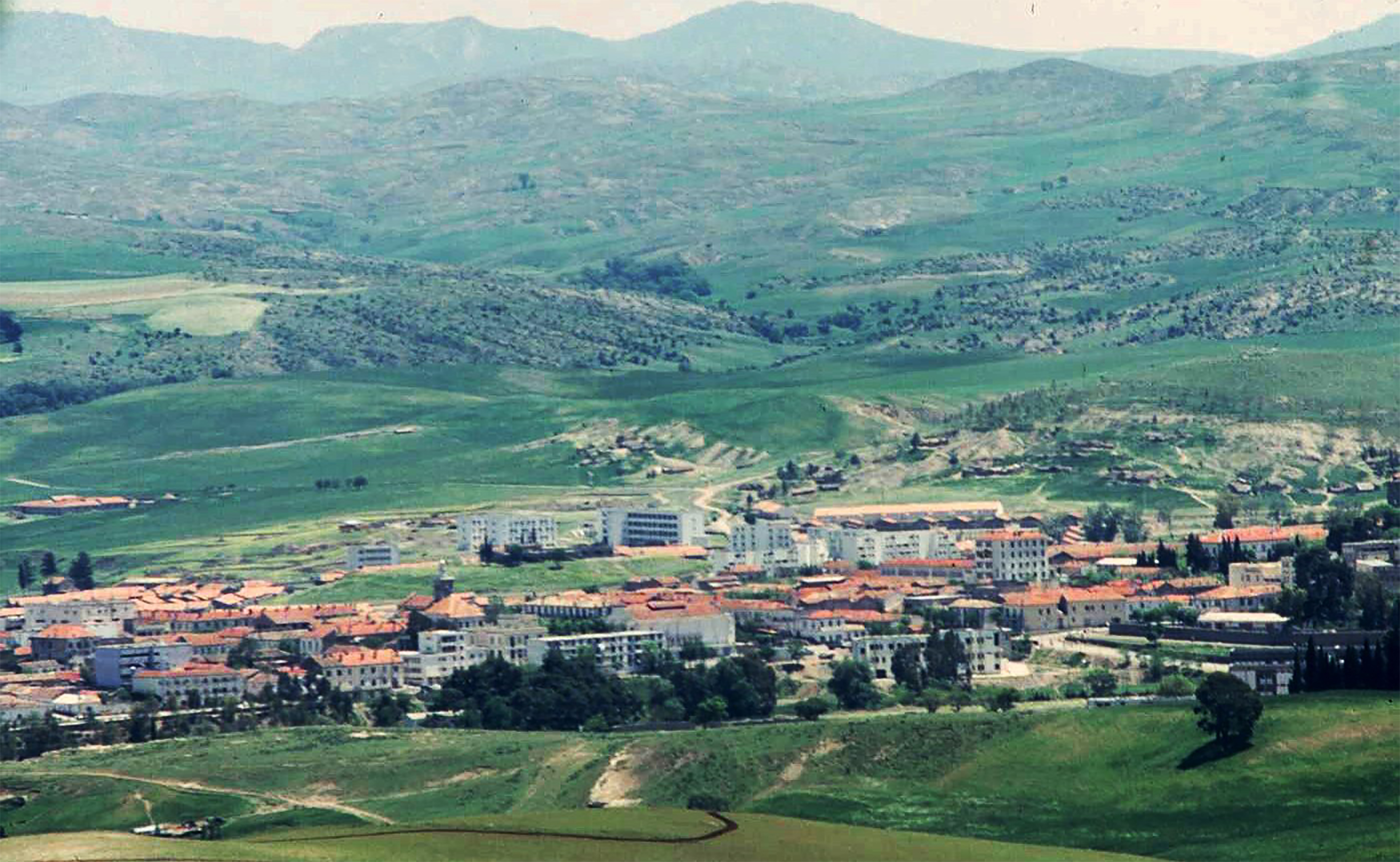

- Location within Algeria
- Coordinates: 36°8′50″N 3°41′26″E
- Country: Algeria
- Province: Bouïra Province
- District: Sour El-Ghozlane

Population (2008)
  - Total: 50,120
- Time zone: UTC+1 (CET)

Sour El-Ghizlane (or Souk El Ghoziane) is a town and commune in Algeria's central-northern, just-landlocked Bouïra Province.

According to the 1998 census it has a population of 42,179.

== History ==
=== Pre Historic ===
A prehistoric tool (biface) testifying to the human presence from prehistoric times was found west of the city.

It is a town inhabited since prehistoric times, the first city founded in Roman province in the center of deep Algeria, a Roman fortress but originally a Numidian city. Its construction dates from the year 33 av. AD during the reign of Emperor Augustus. Auzia quickly became a powerful city, capital of the highland regions, which relegates to a secondary role the strategic importance of the Roman city of Djemila, the ancient Cuicui, in the wilaya of Setif because of its remoteness from the centers Of Roman power.

=== Roman Empire ===
At the time of the Roman presence in Africa, the city bore the name of Auzia. The remains of a theater have been spotted there. It is the location of the Roman city Auzia, in the province Mauretania Caesariensis. The name Auzia is still used as a Roman Catholic titular bishopric.

Auzia was part of the division of the Roman Empire of North Africa. Its position as a city at the gates of the Sahara marked the beginning of the period when the Roman conquest reached the limits of the world known at the time and where the Roman civilization. The city of Auzia has two characteristics in Roman history in North Africa, its great influence on its bureaucratic and military structure and its strategic location as a great religious edifice. Like the construction of the temple of Apollo, supposed to be located at the present site of the civil hospital of Sour-El-Ghozlane. Auzia was equipped with an amphitheater built by the city's bourgeois institution to host shows, such as gladiatorial fights. The ruins also have a bath house, forum and temples. In addition, Auzia is identified as a city with political power dominated by a patriarchal link and entirely in the hands of two comites, organized to reflect at best the tribal divisions of the city.

On the other hand, its administrative and military status reveals that it was definitively subjected to the order of the Roman Empire with the status of autonomous city of the Roman province (free zone: region of Algiers to Bou-Saada) caesarean. Auzia is a large city of ovoid form, destined to serve as capital in this region of central Algeria, Auguste had it endowed with several public edifices: a forum (present room of the festivals), several temples, a curia, a market, a theater and large thermal baths. Auzia was erected on a hill at a moderate altitude, where to this day a wall was in good condition in some places, revealing a kind of citadel which protected the inhabitants.

Around the year 17 Tacfarinas, who had served in the Roman Army before deserting to take the lead of a revolt by federated Berber tribes and their Moorish neighbors, whose leaders Mazippa, and the Cinithians revolted against the Roman army. The insurrection, based on the tactics of harassment (contemporary guerrilla warfare), stretched from Little Syrte in the east to Mauretania in the west and lasted seven years. The proconsul Cornelius Dolabella ended the war by besieging the fort of Tacfarinas, presumably situated at Auzia, in the year 24 apr. AD

It was also the most frequented Roman tourist spot for the gazelle hunting that the city itself was named by the Algerian administration Sour-El-Ghozlane meaning Rampart of the Gazelles. For a long time, Auzia was a commercial city but its development was hampered by several internal conflicts and violent tribal revolts.

=== French Colonial ===
Sour El Ghozlane served under the French as a military post from 1845 and received the name of Aumale in honor of the Duke of Aumale, son of Louis Philippe.

== Famous Residents ==
The poets Djamel Amrani (1935–2005), Messaour Boulanouar (1933), Kaddour M'Hamsadji (1933) and Arezki Metref (1952) are natives of Sour El-Ghozlane and M'hamed Aoune lived there.

Mourad Kaouah (1919–1989) and the French actor Jean-Claude Brialy (1933–2007) were also born there.

In La Chimère and the Gui (ed. Of the Writers, 2002) General Norbert Molinier speaks at length about his childhood in Aumale.

A text by Jean Sénac entitled Poetry by Sour-El-Ghozlane was published in 1981 by L'Orycte, and reprinted in Jean Sénac

Conrad Detrez and Vital Lahaye taught in the early 1970s at El-Ghazali High School in Sour El-Ghozlane.
