= Marcus Furius Camillus (consul) =

1st century AD Roman senator and consul

Marcus Furius Camillus (c. 41 BC – after AD 18) was a Roman senator and a close friend of the emperor Tiberius. Despite being without previous military experience, he enjoyed several successes against the Numidian rebel Tacfarinas while serving as governor of Africa, and was even praised in public by the Emperor and awarded triumphal honours. The historian Tacitus, in his Annales (published AD 109), joked that Camillus subsequently lived invisibly enough to survive this great honour (an allusion to the endless series of executions of prominent senators on spurious treason charges under Tiberius).

== Early life ==
He was a member of the gens Furia, whose origin had been in the Latin city of Tusculum. An early member of this family was Marcus Furius Camillus (c. 446 - 365 BC), who was known as the Second Founder of Rome for his victory over the Gauls during the Gallic siege of Rome. The family had declined over the centuries and by the time of Augustus they were relatively unimportant.

== Career ==
Information about his early career is not known but if he had followed the cursus honorum he would probably have been 33 years old at the time of his consulship in 8 AD. This was the normal age for a man of patrician rank to become consul under the Principate as opposed to during the Roman Republic when the minimum age was 40. From this information we can guess that he had been a Quaestor (1 BC), an Aedile (2 AD), Praetor (5 AD) and a governor of a small province before becoming Consul.

In 17 AD he was named Proconsul of Africa and inherited a war against the Numidian insurgent Tacfarinas. The war proved to be a difficult one because the tribes of this region did not live in towns which the Romans could attack. Camillus then had to fight a tough campaign of guerrilla warfare against the tribes who were very adept at this type of war and would not be easily subdued.

The revolt seems to have erupted over the construction of a road through the tribal areas. The coalition included the Gaetuli (from who the revolt was named) Cinithians (who Tacitus asserts were unwilling participants), Garamantes, Moors and Musulanians themselves and was the largest revolt against Roman rule in Algeria during the whole of the Roman occupation.

The revolt was in two parties. The main body of the revolt was under command of Tacfarinas (d. 24 AD), Roman auxiliary soldier of Roman North Africa, who led the Musulamii, a tribe that inhabited the southern regions of Africa Proconsularis along the northern fringe of the Sahara desert. Tacitus describes him as having the rudiments of Roman training, which he used in his army. Camillus engaged Tacfarinas, according to Tacitus, with a significantly smaller army of one legion and using conventional Roman tactics was able to destroy Tacfarinas larger army, of Berbers. Tacfarinas himself escaped and fought on till being defeated in 24AD.

Mazippas role in the revolt was said by Tacitus to have ravaged the country and marked his way with fire and sword. The cleanup of Mazipps' army took some months. Tacitus describes his conservative victory as

[Camillus] ... once more revived the glory of his ancestors; but he did it without their talents.

In 18 AD, Camillus was replaced by Lucius Apronius as proconsul of Africa. On his return to Rome, Tiberius lavished triumphal ornaments, on him – a rare achievement for someone outside of the Julio-Claudian dynasty.

The historian Tacitus wrote about him: "for the first time in centuries, a member of the Furius family had achieved military fame".

== Reputation ==
Unlike other senators who fell after plotting against the imperial dynasty, Camillus was deemed totally unambitious and of no danger to the emperor Tiberius:

His moderation, and the simplicity of his manners, screened him from envy. He enjoyed his honors with impunity.

== Family ==
He was the father of Livia Medullina Camilla who was betrothed to Claudius allegedly at Tiberius's instigation to reward a loyal friend; however, Livia died the day of her wedding, in 9 AD or 10 AD.

Camillus was also the father of Lucius Arruntius Camillus Scribonianus, consul of 32. Scribonianus was the instigator of the first major attempted coup of Claudius' reign, while governor of Dalmatia in 42.

== Footnotes ==
Political offices
Preceded by Quintus Caecilius Metellus Creticus Silanus; Lucilius Longus	Roman consul AD 8 with Sextus Nonius Quinctilianus	Succeeded by Lucius Apronius; Aulus Vibius Habitus as suffecti
