= Marcus Vinicius (consul 30) =

Roman senator and consul (c. 5 BC- AD 46)

Marcus Vinicius (c. 5 BC – AD 46) was twice Roman consul and, as husband of Julia Livilla, grandson-in-law (progener) of the emperor Tiberius. He was the son and grandson of two consuls, Publius Vinicius (consul 2 AD) and Marcus Vinicius (consul 19 BC).

== Life ==
Born in Cales in Campania, Vinicius started his senatorial career as quaestor in AD 20. That same year, Vinicius was requested to take part in the defence of Gnaeus Calpurnius Piso for the murder of Germanicus, but refused. He was present for the trial, as his name appears as one of seven witnesses of the Senatus consultum de Cn. Pisone patre, the Roman Senate's official act concerning Piso's trial and punishment.

In 30, Vinicius was appointed to the consulship, which he held with Lucius Cassius Longinus. In the same year, Velleius Paterculus published his Histories, which he dedicated to Vinicius.

In 33, Tiberius selected him as the husband for Julia Livilla, the youngest daughter of Germanicus. On that occasion, Tacitus describes Vinicius as "mild in character and an elaborate orator".

For the term 39/40, Vinicius was proconsular governor of Asia. Prior to this he had been appointed to a committee assigned to estimate the damages caused by a fire on the Aventine Hill.

Vinicius and his nephew, Lucius Annius Vinicianus, were involved in the assassination of the emperor Caligula and, for a short time, even attempted to become his successor to the throne.

After Claudius became emperor, Vinicius accompanied him during the Roman conquest of Britain in 43 and was awarded the ornamenta triumphalia. In 45, he was honoured with the rare distinction of a second consulship as prior consul; his colleague that year was Titus Statilius Taurus Corvinus.

At Messalina's instigation, Vinicius was killed in 46. He nevertheless received a state funeral.

== Appearance in fiction ==
- The lead character in the novel Quo Vadis by Henryk Sienkiewicz, also named Marcus Vinicius, is the fictional son of the historical Marcus Vinicius.

== Secondary sources ==
- Syme, Ronald (1939). The Roman Revolution. Oxford: Clarendon Press.
- Vogel-Weidemann, Ursula (1982). Die Statthalter von Africa und Asia in den Jahren 14-68 n. Chr.: Eine Untersuchung zum Verhältnis Princeps und Senat. Bonn: Habelt.

Political offices
Preceded by Aulus Plautius, and Lucius Nonius Asprenas as Suffect consuls	Consul of the Roman Empire; 30 with Lucius Cassius Longinus	Succeeded by Lucius Naevius Surdinus, and Gaius Cassius Longinus
Preceded by Titus Statilius Taurus, and Publius Calvisius Sabinus Pomponius Secundus	Consul of the Roman Empire; 45 with Titus Statilius Taurus Corvinus	Succeeded by Tiberius Plautius Silvanus Aelianus as Suffect consul
