= Livia Medullina =

Fiancee of Roman emperor Claudius (c. 6 BC - c. AD 10)

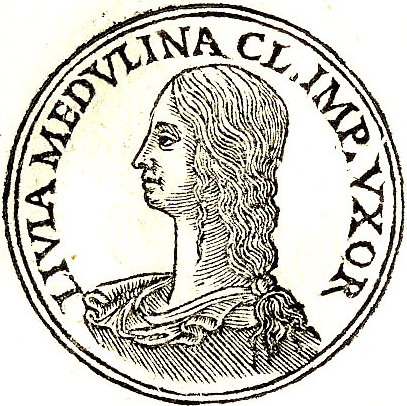
- Livia Medullina from "Promptuarium Iconum Insigniorum", 1553, Guillaume Rouillé
- Born: Furia Livia Medullina Camilla circa 6 BC
- Died: circa 10 AD (aged 15)
- Known for: Fiancee of Claudius
- Father: Marcus Furius Camillus
- Relatives: Lucius Arruntius Camillus Scribonianus

Furia (Note: She is not actually attested to have used her nomen gentilicium.) Livia Medullina Camilla (c. 6 BC–c. AD 10) was the second fiancee of the future Emperor Claudius.

== Biography ==
Medullina was the daughter of Marcus Furius Camillus consul in AD 8, who was a close friend of the emperor Tiberius and Livia Scriboniana, the daughter of Marcus Livius Drusus Libo (born Lucius Scribonius Libo), the adopted brother of the empress Livia. As a child, Medullina may have been called by the names Furia and Camilla (possibly along with her other names), but as an adult she seems to have been referred to mainly as "Livia Medullina". Her nomen gentilicium Furia is not actually attested but can be assumed to have been used at some point due to Roman naming conventions for women at the time.

Medullina's brother was Lucius Arruntius Camillus Scribonianus, who had been adopted by Lucius Arruntius. He was consul in AD 32, as the colleague of Gnaeus Domitius Ahenobarbus.

Medullina was betrothed to Claudius some time after his first engagement, to his relative Aemilia Lepida, was broken by Augustus in AD 8, due to the disgrace of Aemilia's parents. Tiberius probably pushed for the new betrothal, in order to reward his friend with a connection to the imperial family. The betrothal of Medullina and Claudius is attested by an inscription erected by Camilla's pedagogue, dedicated to "Medullina Camilli f. Ti. Claudi Neronis Germanici sponsa" (Medullina, daughter of Camillus, betrothed of Tiberius Claudius Nero Germanicus).

In The Twelve Caesars, Suetonius states that Medullina unexpectedly fell ill, and died on the day of her wedding to Claudius, possibly in AD 9 or 10.

Medullina's brother Scribonianus was the instigator of the first major rebellion against Claudius, while he was governor of Dalmatia in AD 42.

== Literary depiction ==
In Robert Graves' novel I, Claudius, Medullina Camilla is depicted as an early love of Claudius, who is able to look past his infirmities. Against Livia Drusilla's wishes, Claudius is permitted to marry Medullina by Germanicus and Augustus. However, Claudius is robbed of happiness on the day of the engagement as Medullina Camilla is assassinated, purportedly for an unrelated vendetta against Medullina's uncle.

== Bibliography ==
- Gaius Suetonius Tranquillus, De Vita Caesarum (Lives of the Caesars, or The Twelve Caesars).
- Meriwether Stuart, "The Date of the Inscription of Claudius on the Arch of Ticinum", in American Journal of Archaeology, vol. XL, pp. 314–322 (1936).
- Ronald Syme, The Roman Revolution, Oxford University Press (1939).
- Timothy P. Wiseman, "Calpurnius Siculus and the Claudian Civil War", in The Journal of Roman Studies, vol. 72, pp. 57–67 (1982).
- Mika Kajava, "Livia Medullina and CIL X 6561", in Arctos, 1986, Acta Philologica Fennica, pp. 59–71 (1987).
- Barbara Levick, Claudius, Yale University Press (1990); Tiberius the Politician, Routledge (2003).
- Mary Mudd, I, Livia: The Counterfeit Criminal. The Story of a Much Maligned Woman, Trafford Publishing (2005).
- David L. Vagi, "Tiberius Claudius Drusus († AD 20), Son of Claudius and Urgulanilla", in American Journal of Numismatics, vol. 22, pp. 81–92 (2010).
- Alison E. Cooley, The Cambridge Manual of Latin Epigraphy, Cambridge University Press (2012).
- Andrew Pettinger, The Republic in Danger: Drusus Libo and the Succession of Tiberius, Oxford University Press (2012).
- Stephen P. Kershaw, A Brief History of the Roman Empire, Hachette UK (2013).
- Settipani, Christian (2000). Continuité gentilice et continuité familiale dans les familles sénatoriales romaines à l'époque impériale: mythe et réalité. Occasional publications of the Oxford Unit for Prosopographical Research (in Italian). Vol. 2 (illustrated ed.). Unit for Prosopographical Research, Linacre College, University of Oxford. ISBN 9781900934022.
