= Aulus Plautius =

1st century AD Roman politician and general, provincial governor and suffect consul

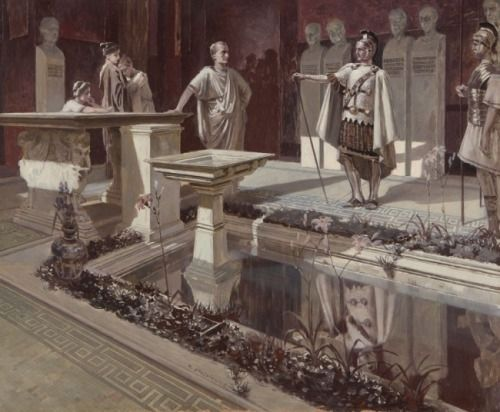
- At the Home of Aulus Plautius (from an illustration by Piotr Stachiewicz for the novel Quo Vadis)

Suffect Consul of the Roman Empire
- In office AD 29 – 29 Serving with Lucius Nonius Asprenas
- Preceded by: Gaius Fufius Geminus; Lucius Rubellius Geminus
- Succeeded by: Marcus Vinicius; Lucius Cassius Longinus

Governor of Roman Britain
- In office AD 43 – 47
- Preceded by: New title
- Succeeded by: Publius Ostorius Scapula

Personal details
- Occupation: Ancient Roman politician and general
- Known for: Beginning the Roman conquest of Britain

Aulus Plautius was a Roman politician and general of the mid-1st century. He began the Roman conquest of Britain in 43, and became the first governor of the new province, serving from 43 to 46.

== Career ==
Little is known of Aulus Plautius's early career. It was previously believed that he was involved in the suppression of a slave revolt in Apulia, which possibly happened in 24, alongside Marcus Aelius Celer. However, the "A·PLAVTIO" of the inscription is now identified as Aulus' father of the same name, Aulus Plautius. The younger Plautius was suffect consul for the second half of 29, with Lucius Nonius Asprenas as his colleague. Subsequently, he held a provincial governorship, probably of Pannonia, in the early years of Claudius's reign; another inscription shows he oversaw the building of a road between Trieste and Rijeka at that time. Anthony Birley suspects Plautius also played a role in suppressing the coup by Lucius Arruntius Camillus Scribonianus in 42.

Claudius appointed Plautius to lead his invasion of Britannia in 43. The casus belli was to restore Verica, king of the Atrebates and an ally of Rome, to the throne; he had been deposed by his eastern neighbours, the Catuvellauni. Birley argues that Plautius was selected not only out of gratitude for his loyalty the previous year, but for his established familial connections to Claudius and the Imperial family.

The invasion force consisted of four legions: IX Hispana, then in Pannonia; II Augusta; XIV Gemina; and XX Valeria Victrix, plus about 20,000 auxiliary troops, including Thracians and Batavians. Legio II Augusta was commanded by the future emperor Vespasian. Three other men of appropriate rank to command legions are known to have been involved in the invasion: Vespasian's brother, Titus Flavius Sabinus, and Gnaeus Hosidius Geta appear in Dio Cassius's account of the invasion; Gnaeus Sentius Saturninus is mentioned by Eutropius, although as a former consul he may have been too senior, and perhaps accompanied Claudius later.

On the beaches of northern Gaul Plautius faced a mutiny by his troops, who were reluctant to cross the Ocean and fight beyond the limits of the known world. They were persuaded after Claudius's freedman and secretary Narcissus addressed them. Seeing a former slave in place of their commander, they cried "Io Saturnalia!" (Saturnalia being a Roman festival in which social roles were reversed for the day) and the mutiny was over.

The invasion force is generally believed to have landed at Richborough in Kent, although elements may have landed elsewhere (see Site of the Claudian invasion of Britain). The Britons, led by Togodumnus and Caratacus of the Catuvellauni, were reluctant to fight a pitched battle, relying instead on guerrilla tactics. However, Plautius defeated first Caratacus on the River Medway, then Togodumnus on the River Thames. Togodumnus died shortly afterwards, although Caratacus survived and continued to be a thorn in the invaders' side.

Having reached the Thames River, Plautius halted and sent for Claudius, who arrived with elephants and heavy artillery and completed the march on the Catuvellaunian capital, Camulodunum (Colchester). Claudius claimed in a triumphal inscription that he accepted the surrender of 11 British kings at Camulodunum. A Roman province was established from the conquered territory and Plautius was appointed its governor.

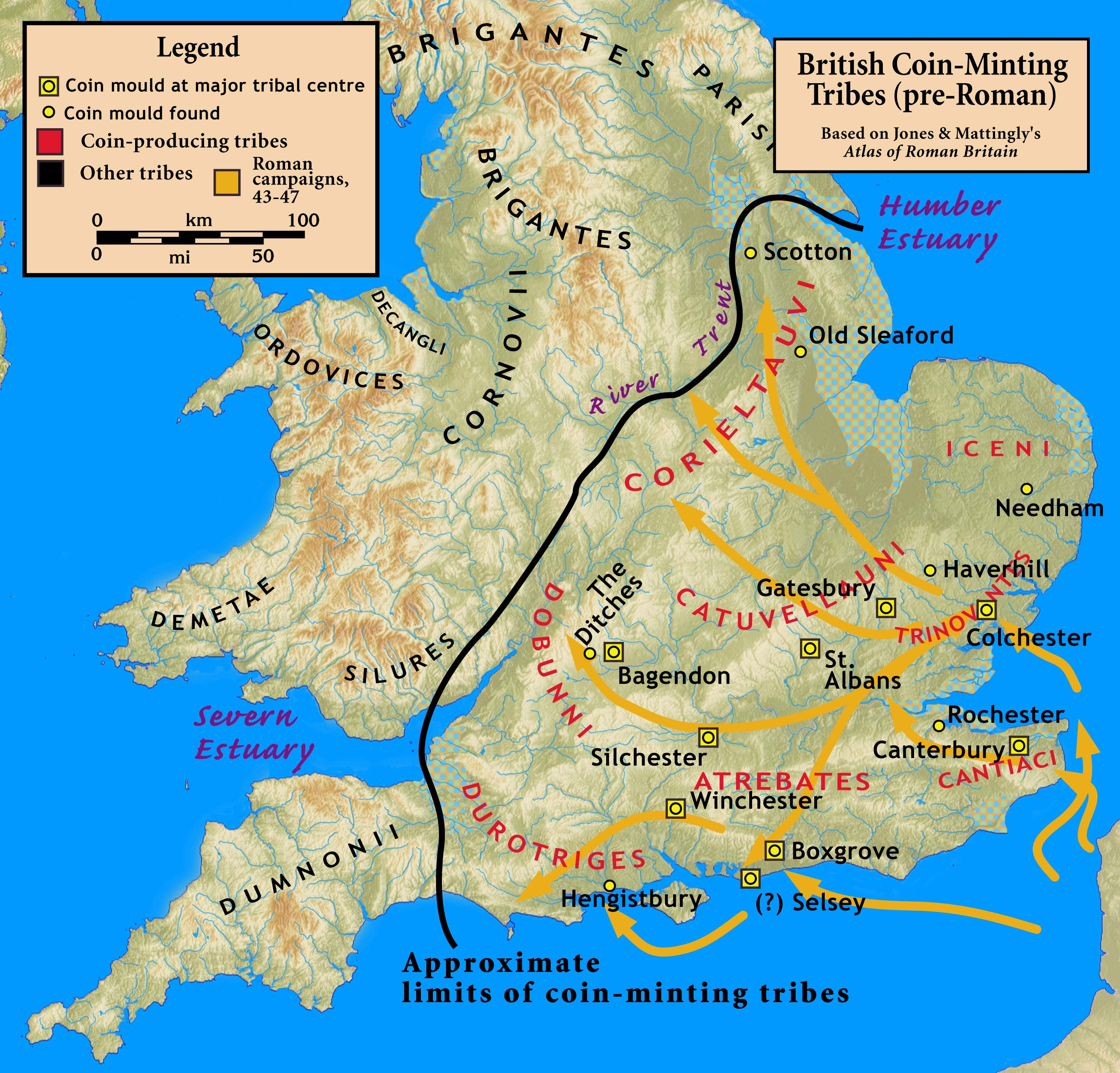
Conquests under Aulus Plautius, focused on the commercially valuable southeast of Britain.

Beginning in the year following the successful conquest, the four legions that comprised the provincial garrison proceeded to extend the boundaries of the new province: Legio IX pushed north along the course of what became Ermine Street to construct a camp at what later became Lincoln; Legio XIV advanced into the Midlands along the course of Watling Street, then turned north to set up its base at what later became Leicester; Legio II, under the command of Vespasian, marched through the south reducing over 20 hill forts, conquering the Isle of Wight, and subduing two powerful tribes, to eventually set up its own base most likely at Exeter; the fourth major unit, Legio XX, Plautius likely kept at Camulodunum with some auxiliaries as a reserve force. Some years would pass before the provincial seat would be moved to Londinium, which came into existence later in Plautius' tenure.

In 47, Plautius was replaced by Publius Ostorius Scapula. On his return to Rome and civil life, Plautius was granted an ovation, during which the emperor himself walked by his side to and from the Capitol.

== Family ==
Aulus Plautius was the son of Aulus Plautius, who was suffect consul in 1 BCE, and possibly Vitellia. Quintus Plautius, consul in 36, was his younger brother. His sister Plautia has been identified as the wife of Publius Petronius, consul in 19; the marriage is attested in an inscription. The daughter of Plautia and Publius Petronius, Petronia, married Aulus Vitellius, later emperor during the Year of Four Emperors.

Aulus Plautius married Pomponia Graecina, whom Birley has identified as the daughter of Gaius Pomponius Graecinus, suffect consul in 16. After the execution of her kinswoman Julia Drusi Caesaris by Claudius and Messalina, Pomponia remained in mourning for forty years in open and unpunished defiance of the emperor. In 57 she was charged with a "foreign superstition", interpreted by some to mean conversion to Christianity. According to Roman law, she was tried by her husband before her kinsmen, and was acquitted. There are no attested children of this marriage; though it has been suggested that a later Aulus Plautius, alleged to be the lover of Agrippina the Younger, may have been their son. However, some modern historians, such as Birley, have suggested that, despite the shared name, this Aulus Plautius is the son of Aulus Plautius' brother, Quintus Plautius.

Aulus Plautius was the uncle whose "distinguished service" saved his nephew Plautius Lateranus, (another son of Quintus Plautius) from execution in 48 after his affair with Messalina was discovered. Lateranus was removed from his senatorial position and exiled instead. Lateranus was later executed for his involvement in the Pisonian conspiracy against Nero in 65, from which it is concluded that his uncle Aulus Plautius was by that time deceased.

== Portrayals in fiction ==
Plautius is a character in Henryk Sienkiewicz's novel Quo Vadis, and in Simon Scarrow's novel The Eagle's Conquest.

In the film Quo Vadis (1951), based on Sienkiewicz's novel, Plautius (played by Felix Aylmer) and his wife Pomponia are (ahistorically) Christians.

Plautius is played by David Morrissey in the streaming TV series Britannia (2018), which portrays a fantasy version of the Roman conquest, where he serves as the series' primary antagonist.

== Bibliography ==
- William Smith (ed) (1870), Dictionary of Greek and Roman Biography and Mythology Vol 4 p. 405
- George Patrick Welch (1963), Britannia: the Roman Conquest and Occupation of Britain
- Anthony R Birley (1981), The Fasti of Roman Britain, p 37–40
- Anthony R Birley (2005), The Roman Government of Britain, p 17–25

Political offices
| Preceded by Gaius Fufius Geminus, and Lucius Rubellius Geminus | Suffect Consul of the Roman Empire; 29 with Lucius Nonius Asprenas | Succeeded by Marcus Vinicius, and Lucius Cassius Longinus |
| New title | Roman governors of Britain; 43–47 | Succeeded by Publius Ostorius Scapula |
