= Lucius Cassius Longinus (consul 30) =

1st century AD Roman senator

Lucius Cassius Longinus was a Roman senator, who was active during the reigns of Tiberius and Caligula. He was ordinary consul in the year AD 30 with Marcus Vinicius as his colleague. Longinus came from an ancient and noble gens, the Cassii. He is best known as the first husband of the Emperor Caligula's sister Julia Drusilla, whom he married in 33.

In early 37, he was appointed by Tiberius as a commissioner. After Caligula became Caesar later that year, he ordered Longinus to divorce Drusilla so that she could marry Marcus Aemilius Lepidus. While Longinus was proconsular governor of Asia (40/41), Caligula ordered his execution based on an oracle which Caligula interpreted as indicating that Cassius would assassinate him.

Political offices
Preceded by Aulus Plautius; Lucius Nonius Asprenas as Suffect consuls	Roman consul 30 with Marcus Vinicius	Succeeded by Lucius Naevius Surdinus; Gaius Cassius Longinus as Suffect consuls
