= Gaius Cassius Longinus (consul 30) =

Roman jurist and senator

Gaius Cassius Longinus was a Roman jurist and politician from the first century CE. Born around 13 BC, he was the grandnephew of Servius Sulpicius Rufus, he was also a great-grandnephew or great-grandson of Gaius Cassius Longinus, one of Caesar's assassins. Longinus was suffect consul of the second half of the year 30 as the colleague of Lucius Naevius Surdinus.

Cassius, a pupil of Sabinus, was head of the legal school called the Sabinians or Cassinians. His principal works are the libri (commentarii) iuris civilis in at least ten volumes, which only survive in quotes by later authors such as Iavolenus. After completing his term as suffect consul, Longinus served as proconsular governor of Asia in 40–41, then governor of the imperial province of Syria in 41–49. He was exiled by Nero to Sardinia in 65, but returned to Rome when Vespasian acceded to the purple, by which time he was blind, according to Suetonius.

Tacitus includes a speech of Cassius, when he was a senator in the time of Nero, on the debate that arose when there had been mass protests in Rome when 400 innocent slaves were to be executed because they belonged to the household of Lucius Pedanius Secundus who had been murdered by his slave. It is open to question as to what extent the speech we have reflected what Cassius actually said, and to what extent it represents Tacitus's views, though it is at least possible that Tacitus made use of the Senate's records; the hard line expressed is in line with what we know about Cassius. In the speech Cassius conceded that the execution would be unjust. He also conceded it violated the rights of private interests but justified it on the grounds of the public good. The private interests that concerned him did not include any right to life for the slaves but the loss to the heirs. Modern commentators side with those who protested at the time in regarding the law as inherently unjust.

He married Junia Lepida, a descendant of Augustus. They had two children: Cassia Longina (born c. 35 CE), who married the general Gnaeus Domitius Corbulo, and Cassius Lepidus (born c. 55 CE). The latter married an unknown woman by whom he had a daughter, Cassia Lepida (born c. 80 CE). She married Gaius Julius Alexander Berenicianus consul in 116 CE and proconsul of Asia in 132 CE.

== See also ==
- Cassia gens

Political offices
Preceded by Lucius Cassius Longinus; Marcus Vinicius as ordinary consuls	Roman consul 30 (suffect) with Lucius Naevius Surdinus	Succeeded by Tiberius V Sejanus as ordinary consuls
