= Vital Lahaye =

Belgian writer and teacher (born 1937)

Vital Lahaye (born 1937) is a Belgian writer and teacher.

== Biography ==
Vital Lahaye was born on 17 January 1937 in Chassepierre, a small village on the banks of the Semois in the province of Luxembourg, fifth in a family of seven children. His mother keeps the grocery store in the village; His father, of Liège origin, was a painter of buildings. He attended the college of Stavelot then that of Virton. Sensitive to social inequalities, he pursued from 1956 to 1960 his studies at the Faculty of Philosophy and Letters of the University of Liège. Faced with the events of that period (the end of the Belgian colonization in the Congo, the war in Algeria and the denunciation of torture by Henri Alleg), he approached the communist route and met several political leaders from Liège.

From 1960 to 1970 Vital Lahaye became a teacher in free education in Arlon, notably for his pupil Guy Goffette. In 1971, he began teaching in Algeria at Sour El-Ghozlane High School (Wilaya de Bouira) where Conrad Detrez is also a teacher. In 1973, the year of his son Ugo's birth, he returned to Belgium where he taught until 1993 in Libramont, Bastogne and the Royal Athenaeum of Bertrix.

After his retirement in 1993, Vital Lahaye settled in Liège, in the cosmopolitan neighborhood of Coronmeuse, with his son who died in an accident in June 1995. In 1996 Jacques Izoard presented the collection Mon sauce est dans les nom 'be published. In 2002 Vital Lahaye returned to settle in Florenville.
