= Praetor's Edict =

The Praetor's Edict (Edictum praetoris) in ancient Roman law was an annual declaration of principles made by the new praetor urbanus – the elected magistrate charged with administering justice within the city of Rome. (Note: Such Edicts were also issued by the Praetor peregrinus and by the Aediles.) During the early Empire the Praetor's Edict was revised to become the Edictum perpetuum.

== Legality ==
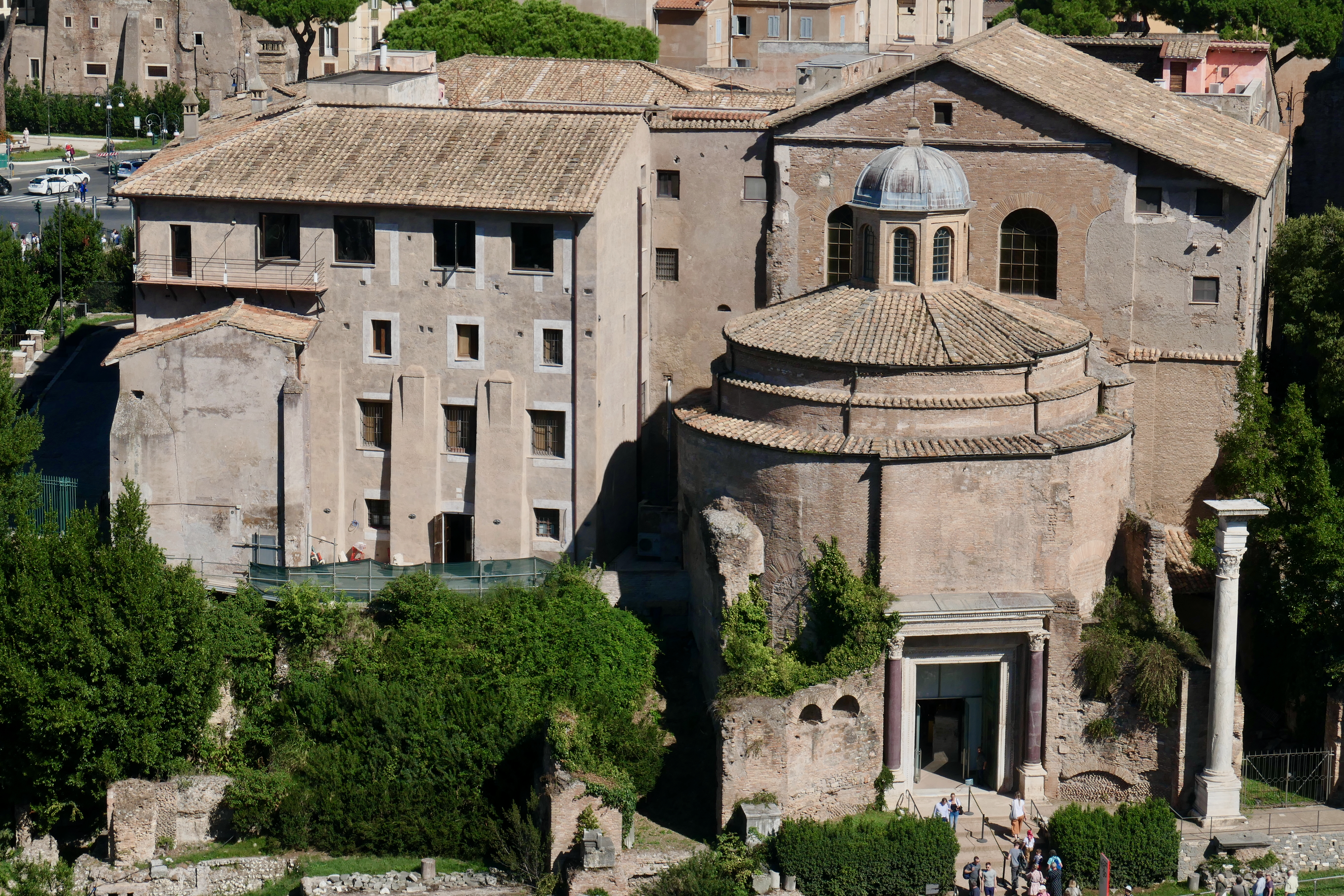
The remains of the residence of the urban praetor at Rome, seen from the ruins of the emperor's palace on Palatine Hill.

The incoming praetor by his edict laid out legal principles he intended to follow when making judicial decisions during his year in office. To some degree the new praetor had sufficient discretion to modify the existing edict of the former praetor. Many years the new praetor would simply adopt and so continue the contents of edict he "inherited" from his predecessor.

Praetors often did not possess any special expertise in law, but rather were successful politicians. So, in deciding whether or not to augment or otherwise modify the edict, the new praetor would usually consult with Roman jurists who were familiar with the applicable areas of the law, and who knew the emerging currents of legal change. Language from the responsa of these Roman scholars of jurisprudence often found its way into the Edict.

The Praetor's Edict had legal force only during the incumbency of the particular praetor who issued it. Yet, as the pre-existing contents of the ongoing edict were generally adopted by next praetor, the edict attained substantial continuity, subject to marginal changes. On the other hand, the yearly changes usually resulted in welcome legal innovations. With the accretion of annual modifications, the document grew in stature, as well as in size, scope, and reach; it became a primary source of legal growth and evolution. In 67 BCE, a lex Cornelia de edictis passed, which required the praetor to abide by his own edict.

== Contents ==
The reconstructed Edict we have today is divided into five parts: I preliminary procedures, II ordinary remedies, III summary remedies, IV execution of judgement, V formulas, interdicts, exceptions, stipulations. Also the Edict has 45 titles, with some subdivisions, and 292 paragraphs. Many paragraph entries contain only the subject matter addressed, without any of its substance (which is unknown to us). While much is considered authentic, uncertainties and unresolved disputes remain for further study. Much is missing.

=== Example quotations ===
Several miscellaneous examples taken from the reconstructed Edict:

"Persons under twenty-five years old. Whatever is said to have been transacted with a person less than twenty-five years old, I shall consider each case on the basis of its particulars." Paragraph 41, in the first part, from title X "Restorations to Original Status".

"Whence anything is thrown out or is poured out onto that place where commonly is made a road or where persons assemble I shall grant an action, for twice as much damage as thereby is caused or done against the person who dwells there." From paragraph 61, in the second part, from title XV "Those Goods That Are in Anyone's Property".

"The institorian action. Whatever is transacted with an agent in respect to that thing for which he is appointed, against the person who appoints him I shall grant an action." Paragraph 102, in the second part, from title XVIII "Whatever Business Is Transacted with a Shipmaster or an Agent Who Is in Another Person's Power". (Note: An institor was a type of business agent for buying and selling.)

"Whoever hides for the purpose of defrauding his creditors, if he is not defended according to the judgment of an honorable man, I shall order his property pursuant to the edict to be possessed, to be advertised for sale, and to be sold." Paragraph 205, in the fourth part, from title XXXVIII "Those Causes for Which a Person Enters into Possession".

"As you now possess certain land about which there is the present action, which land the one party has procured from the other party neither by violence nor secretly nor by precarium, in such manner you shall possess it. Against these conditions, I forbid violence to be employed." Paragraph 247a, in the fifth part, from title XlIII "Interdicts", from subdivision vi "Interdict on as you possess".

=== Reconstruction ===
The Edict we have now has been reconstructed from various sources, mainly from juristic commentaries on it, such as that of Furius Anthianus. Because of its great importance, the Praetor's Edict, or portions of it, often became the subject of detailed examination and study, in the course of which the specific content of the Edict would be described or quotations would be made directly from it. Of course, much of the literature of the ancient world has been lost, the works of Roman jurists included. Those juristic works that do survive usually come from the latter, or classical, period of Roman Law. Accordingly, most of the Edict we have now is based on the content of the Edict revised in AD 129 by emperor Hadrian (see below). How much and in what fashion and degree this Edict of Hadrian's reign differs from the earlier Praetor's Edict of the Roman Republic are questions that may only be addressed by informed speculation.

== Formulary procedure ==
An important aspect of the Praetor's Edict concerned formulary procedure. During the late Republic, the trial at civil law increasingly employed formulary procedure. In this process, the praetor first determines the legal issue in a pending case. Then the praetor decides on a prescriptive formula which instructs what remedy will be appropriate depending on what facts are found. Then the praetor assigns the case to a iudex for trial. After the facts are determined at trial, the iudex gives judgement according to the formula.

The Praetor's Edict contained many different principles of law, often drawing on prior legal rulings. Besides the trial formulas, it also regulated procedural matters, such as the initiation of a legal suit. In time, such sample formulae became listed by the praetor in his Edict issued at the beginning of his term of office.

== Influence ==
As later summarized by the Roman jurist Papinian (c. 148–211), the law that was developed by the praetors in their Edict became an instrument which could supplement, explain, and improve the Ius civile. He writes:

"Praetorian law (jus praetorium) is that which in the public interest the praetors have introduced in aid or supplementation or correction of the jus civile. This is also called honorary law (jus honorarium), being so named for the high office (honos) of the praetor."

Thus, the Praetor's Edict developed into an important vehicle for the evolution of Roman civil law. A great deal of commentary was written by jurists concerning this "praetorian law" or ius honorarium, addressing the legal principles contained in this Edict.

== Edictum perpetuum ==
Eventually, the above discretion allowed the praetor urbanus regarding his edict was no longer considered appropriate. Accordingly circa CE 129, action was taken that severely restricted its further modification. Under the emperor Hadrian (r. 117–138), the celebrated jurist Salvius Julianus made a formal revision to the Praetor's Edict as well as to similar edicts, e.g., that of the aediles. This newly edited and consolidated version of the edict then became fixed, subject only to changes approved by the emperor: hence, the Edictum perpetuum.
