= Gaius Fufius Geminus (consul AD 29) =

1st century AD Roman senator and ally of the empress Livia, the mother of Tiberius

Gaius Fufius Geminus (died AD 29) was a Roman senator who lived during the Principate. He was ordinary consul in the year 29 with Lucius Rubellius Geminus as his colleague. Geminus was the son of Gaius Fufius Geminus.

A portion of his cursus honorum is known from an inscription recovered from Montefano in Italia, which recognized Geminus as the patron of the colony. Geminus began his senatorial career as a quaestor for the emperor Tiberius; after this he was the emperor's designate for the Republican office of plebeian tribune. Around this time, definitely before he acceded to the consulate, Geminus was admitted to the septemviri epulonum, one of the four most prestigious ancient Roman priesthoods.

According to Lactantius, Fufius Geminus was consul along with "Ruberius Geminus" the year that Jesus of Nazareth was crucified.

According to Tacitus, Geminus owed his successes in his senatorial career to the empress Livia, the mother of Tiberius. Tacitus also describes Geminus as "a man well-fitted to win the affection of a woman", and witty, and "accustomed to ridicule Tiberius with those bitter jests the powerful remember so long." Once Livia died, in the year of his consulate, Geminus was prosecuted for treason. According to Dio Cassius, upon being accused of majestas Geminus stood in the Senate chamber, and read his will to the assembled body wherein he left his inheritance in equal portions to his children and the emperor. Thereupon he was charged with being a coward, and he responded by returning home before a vote on the charges was taken. When the quaestor arrived to see to his execution, Geminus slit his wrists saying, "Report to the senate that it is thus one dies who is a man." After his death, his wife Mutilia Prisca entered the Senate House where she killed herself with a dagger she had brought in secretly with her.

Political offices
Preceded by Lucius Junius Silanus, and Gaius Vellaeus Tutor as Suffect consuls	Consul of the Roman Empire; 29 with Lucius Rubellius Geminus	Succeeded by Aulus Plautius, and Lucius Nonius Asprenas as Suffect consuls
