= Servius Asinius Celer =

1st century AD Roman senator and suffect consul

Servius Asinius Celer (died AD 46) was a Roman senator active during the Principate. He was suffect consul in the second half of the year 38 with Sextus Nonius Quinctilianus as his colleague.

Celer was the son of Gaius Asinius Gallus, consul in 8 BC, and Vipsania Agrippina, a former wife of the emperor Tiberius. Celer had several brothers, among them Gaius Asinius Pollio, consul in 23, accused of conspiracy by Valeria Messalina; Marcus Asinius Agrippa, consul in 25; Asinius Saloninus; and Asinius Gallus. In addition, Celer was half brother of Drusus Julius Caesar, son of his mother with Tiberius and heir to the emperor for a time.

According to Pliny the Elder, Celer was a well-known gourmand who paid 8,000 sesterces for a fish. In the year 46, despite his friendship with the emperor Claudius, Celer was accused of participating in a conspiracy to kill the emperor and condemned to death. Seneca the Younger mentions him in his Apocolocyntosis divi Claudii as one of his consular friends who confront Claudius in the afterworld as being responsible for their deaths.

The actual historical (and human) consul actually bearing name "Asinius Celer", meaning "rapid ass" (of which "Asinius", meaning "ass", had been inherited for generations), has been proposed as an obvious inspiration for Caligula´s plan to make his horse "Incitatus" (also meaning "rapid") a consul as well. See DAVID WOODS, CALIGULA, INCITATUS, AND THE CONSULSHIP, The Classical Quarterly New Series, Vol. 64, No. 2 (DECEMBER 2014), pp. 772-777 (6 pages), https://www.jstor.org/stable/43905613

Political offices
Preceded by Marcus Aquila Julianus, and Publius Nonius Asprenas Calpurnius Serranus as ordinary consuls	Suffect consul of the Roman Empire; 38 with Sextus Nonius Quinctilianus	Succeeded by Caligula II, and Lucius Apronius Caesianus as ordinary consuls
