= Sextus Nonius Quinctilianus (consul 8) =

Roman senator

Sextus Nonius Quinctilianus (fl. 1st century AD) was a Roman Senator. He was appointed consul in AD 8 as the colleague of Marcus Furius Camillus.

== Biography ==
Nonius Quinctilianus was probably the son of Lucius Nonius Asprenas, who was the son of the suffect consul of 36 BC, and Quinctilla, who was the sister of Publius Quinctilius Varus (who died at the Battle of the Teutoburg Forest). It has also been postulated that he may have been the natural son of Publius Quinctilius Varus and who was at some point adopted by his brother-in-law Lucius Nonius Asprenas. If so, he might have been a son of Varus' wife Vipsania.

In 6 BC, Nonius Quinctilianus was a Triumvir monetalis. In 4 BC he accompanied Varus to Syria, probably as one of his military tribunes. His "election" as Roman consul in AD 8 occurred under unusual circumstances as the elections in AD 7 for the following year's magistrates were so contentious that the emperor Augustus was forced to appoint them himself, with Augustus selecting Nonius Quinctilianus as one of the consuls. He was subsequently appointed the proconsular governor of Asia, serving in AD 16/17.

Nonius Quinctilianus married Sosia, a daughter of Gaius Sosius, the consul of 32 BC, and they had at least two sons, Sextus Nonius Quinctilianus, the suffect consul of AD 38, and Lucius Nonius Quinctilianus.

== See also ==
- List of Roman consuls

== Sources ==
- Levick, Barbara, Tiberius the Politician (1999)
- Swan, Peter Michael, The Augustan Succession: An Historical Commentary on Cassius Dio's Roman History Books 55-56 (9 B.C.-A.D. 14) (2004)
- Syme, Ronald (1986). The Augustan Aristocracy. Clarendon Press. ISBN 978-0-19-814859-3.

Political offices
| Preceded by Quintus Caecilius Metellus Creticus Silanus, and Lucilius Longus | Consul of the Roman Empire; AD 8 with Marcus Furius Camillus | Succeeded by Lucius Apronius, and Aulus Vibius Habitus as Suffect consuls |
