= Arezki Metref =

Algerian writer, poet and journalist

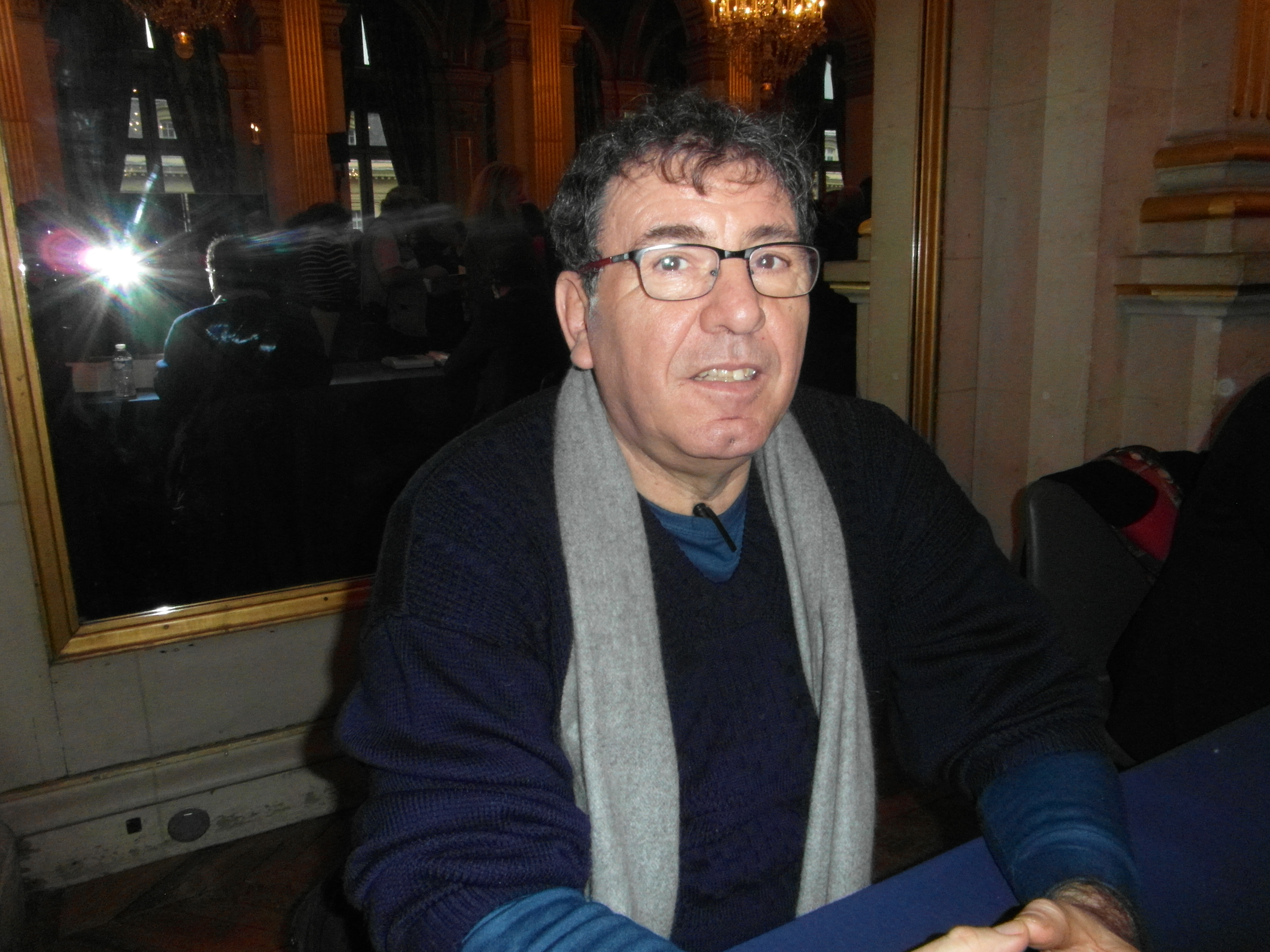
Arezki Metref

Arezki Metref (born May 21, 1952), is an Algerian writer, poet and journalist.

== Biography ==
Arezki Metref born in Sour El-Ghozlane, near Bouira, on May 21, 1952. His father, Belaid Metref, a kabyle originated from Aith yenni in Greater Kabylia. Arezki lived in Bouira, then Laghouat, and in Algiers from 1956. Arezki Metref, a student of the Institute of Political Studies in Algiers, became a journalist in 1972, Collaborates in L'Unité, Révolution africaine, El Moudjahid, Algérie-Actualité. In January 1993, he created with Tahar Djaout and Abdelkrim Djaad the weekly Ruptures, of which he was editor-in-chief.

After the assassination of Djaout, he left for France in 1993 and returned to Algeria only in 2001. He collaborated with the London daily The Guardian, in the magazine Autrement, Maghreb-Machrek, Panoramique and in the world section of the weekly Politis. He also gives lectures on Algeria in France and abroad. After publishing numerous books, he began painting in 2003 and exhibited in 2004.
