= Djamel Amrani =

Algerian poet, playwright and essayist

- Born: August 29, 1935; Sour El-Ghozlane, Algeria
- Died: March 2, 2005 (aged 69); Algiers, Algeria
- Education: Bir Mourad Raïs Communal School
- Occupation: Writer

Signature
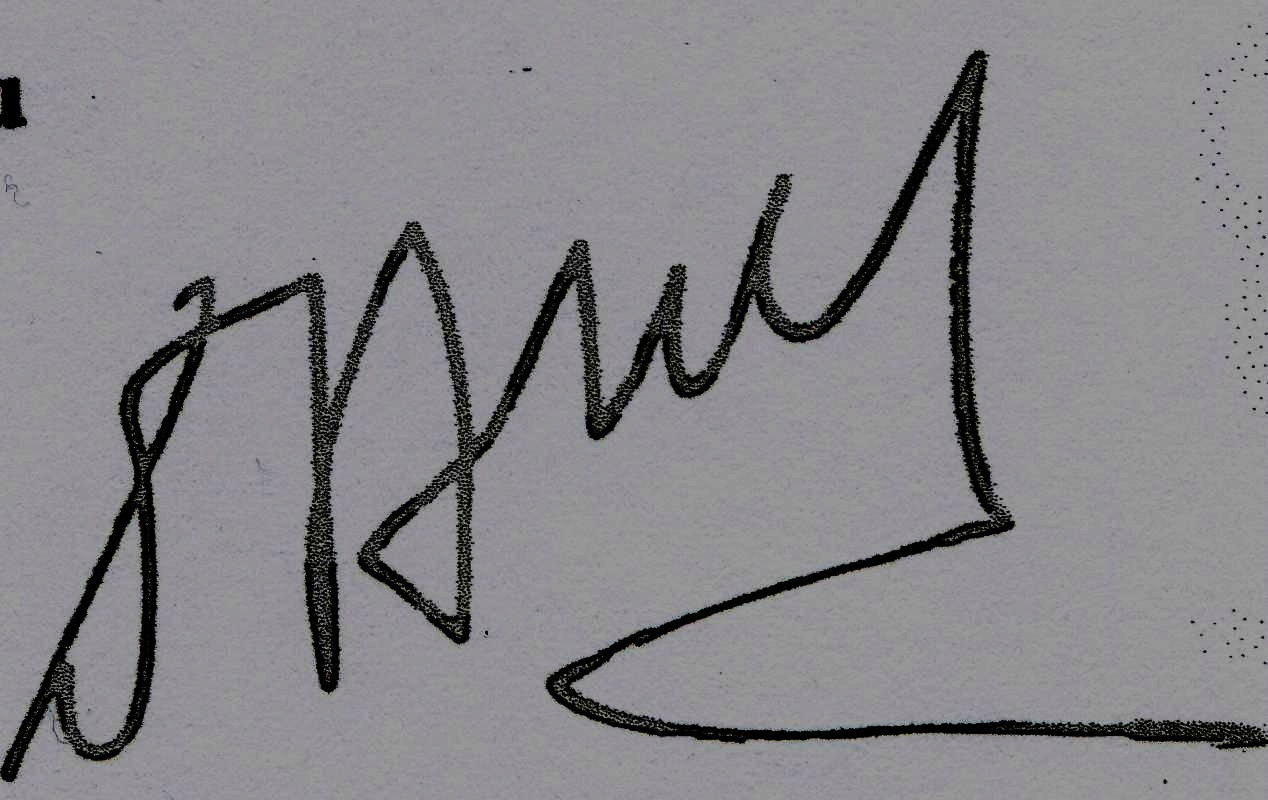

Djamel Amrani was born on 29 August 1935 in Sour El-Ghozlane (Algeria) and died on 2 March 2005 in Algiers. He was an Algerian writer of French expression.

== Biography ==
Djamel (or Djamal) Amrani was educated in 1952, at the communal school of Bir Mourad Raïs. On 19 May 1956 he participated in the strike of Algerian students. In 1957, he was arrested, tortured and imprisoned by the colonial army. In 1958, when he was released from prison, he was expelled to France. In 1960, he published his first book at Éditions de Minuit, Le Témoin. That same year, he met Pablo Neruda and created the newspaper Chaâb. In 1966, he became a producer of a Maghrebian program at the ORTF, and began a radio career alongside Leïla Boutaleb on Algerian radio. In 2004, he was awarded the Pablo Neruda Medal, the international distinction of poetry.
