= Aulus Licinius Nerva Silianus =

1st century AD Roman senator and moneyer

Aulus Licinius Nerva Silianus was a Roman senator who was active during the Principate. He was consul in AD 7 as the colleague of Quintus Caecilius Metellus Creticus Silanus. Silianus was born the second of three sons of Publius Silius Nerva, consul in 20 BC, and was later adopted by Aulus Licinius Nerva. Velleius Paterculus salutes him for his simplicissimus.

Silianus was a member of the tresviri monetalis, the most prestigious of the four boards that form the vigintiviri; Lucius Valerius Messalla Volesus, consul in AD 5, was one of the other two members of this board at the same time as Silianus. Because assignment to this board was usually allocated to patricians, Ronald Syme sees this as evidence that Silianus was a member of that class. Silianus was also a personal friend of emperor Augustus. Silianus participated in the beginning of the Bellum Batonianum in Illyricum in the year 6, for which he was awarded the consulate. According to the Fasti Urbisalvienses, Silianus resigned his office on June 30, and was replaced by Lucilius Longus. Velleius says that Silianus died without fulfilling his full potential, but gives no details concerning the time or cause.

Aulus Licinius Nerva Silianus, consul in 65, was his grandson.

== Notes ==
Political offices
Preceded by Marcus Aemilius Lepidus, and Lucius Nonius Asprenas as suffect consuls	Consul of the Roman Empire; AD 7 with Quintus Caecilius Metellus Creticus Silanus	Succeeded by Quintus Caecilius Metellus Creticus Silanus, and Lucilius Longus
