= Quintus Caecilius Metellus Creticus Silanus =

1st century Roman senator, consul and governor of Syria

Quintus Caecilius Metellus Creticus Silanus, born Iunius Silanus was adopted by Quintus Caecilius Metellus, a descendant of the optimate Quintus Caecilius Metellus Creticus and the natural son of Marcus Junius Silanus. He was a Consul in AD 7 and governor of Syria from AD 13 to 17. Silanus was socially connected with the then-heir to the Roman principate Germanicus; his daughter at one time was betrothed to Germanicus' son Nero.

Towards the end of his governorship Vonones seized the throne of Armenia, but Vonones was unpopular with the neighbouring Parthian Empire and war threatened. The Romans, not desiring war with Parthia, had Creticus Silanus summon Vonones to his court in Syria in AD 16. There Vonones was kept under surveillance while allowed to retain his royal pomp and title.

Creticus Silanus was removed as governor of Syria by Tiberius to make way for Gnaeus Calpurnius Piso in AD 17.

== Notes ==
- Simmons, Dustin. From Obscurity to Fame and Back Again: The Caecilii Metelli in the Roman Republic. MA Thesis, Brigham Young University, 2011

Political offices
Preceded by Marcus Aemilius Lepidus, and Lucius Nonius Asprenas	Consul of the Roman Empire; AD 7 with Aulus Licinius Nerva Silianus, followed by Lucilius Longus	Succeeded by Marcus Furius Camillus, and Sextus Nonius Quinctilianus
