= Publius Nonius Asprenas Caesius Cassianus =

First century AD Roman senator and consul

Publius Nonius Asprenas Caesius Cassianus was a Roman senator who was active in the first century. He was appointed suffect consul by Vespasian in either 72 or 73. Cassianus is known only through inscriptions. He is identified as the son of Publius Nonius Asprenas Calpurnius Serranus, ordinary consul of 38.

An inscription from Cilicia records his marking of boundaries of that province, designated as legatus pro praetore provinciae Ciliciae; Werner Eck dates his tenure as legate, or governor, of this imperial province as extending from 72/73 to 74. Since this date makes him the predecessor of Lucius Octavius Memor, who is attested as governor in the year 77, Ronald Syme observed Cassianus is "the first governor of the new province established by Vespasian in 72." Cassianus is also attested as proconsular governor of Asia, one of the most prestigious of governorships a Roman senator could hold, in 86/87.
