= Mourad Kaouah =

Personal details
- Born: 11 April 1919 Aumale, French Algeria
- Died: 7 October 1989 (aged 70) Perpignan, France
- Citizenship: French
- Party: National Front
- Occupation: Politician, football player

Mourad Kaouah (1919–1989) was an Algerian and French politician and football player. He served as the deputy of Algiers from 1958 to 1962. Kaouah was also a member of the right-wing French National Front party. However, his candidacy was unsuccessful in the 1984 elections.

A room in the Cercle Algérianiste Museum in Perpignan is named in his honour.

== Personal life ==
Kaouah was born in Aumale (now Sour El-Ghozlane), French Algeria, to an Algerian family of Ottoman Turkish origin.

He died in Perpignan.
