= Sextus Nonius Quinctilianus (consul 38) =

1st century Roman senator and consul

Sextus Nonius Quinctilianus was a Roman senator who was active in the first century.

== Life ==
He was appointed suffect consul in 38 as the colleague of Servius Asinius Celer.

Quinctilianus was the son of the homonymous consul of the year 8, and Sosia, a daughter of Gaius Sosius, consul in 32 BC. He is known to have at least one brother, Lucius Nonius Quinctilianus.

At some point prior to holding the republican magistracy of plebeian tribune, Quinctilianus had been admitted to the Quindecimviri sacris faciundis, a prestigious priesthood charged with guarding the Sibylline Books. In the year 32, while plebeian tribune, he proposed adding a new volume from Lucius Caninius Gallus to the collection of canonical Sibylline Books; however, the emperor Tiberius gently rebuked Quinctilianus for the proposal, reminding him that this proposed supplement had not passed through the expected procedure and directed that the volume be referred back to the full priesthood for their review and judgment.

Political offices
Preceded by Marcus Aquila Julianus, and Publius Nonius Asprenas Calpurnius Serranus as ordinary consuls	Suffect consul of the Roman Empire; 38 with Servius Asinius Celer	Succeeded by Caligula II, and Lucius Apronius Caesianus as ordinary consuls
