= Asprenas Calpurnius Serranus =

First century AD Roman senator and consul

Asprenas Calpurnius Serranus (died AD 41) was a Roman senator who was active in the first century. He was appointed ordinary consul in 38 as the colleague of Marcus Aquila Julianus. His complete name is Publius Nonius Asprenas Calpurnius Serranus.

Serranus was the son of Lucius Nonius Asprenas, ordinary consul of AD 6 and Calpurnia L. Pisonis f., the daughter of Lucius Calpurnius Piso Caesoninus, consul in 15. He is known to have two brothers, Lucius Nonius Asprenas, suffect consul in AD 29, and Nonius Asprenas Calpurnius Torquatus.

Only one event is known of his life. On the morning that the emperor Caligula was assassinated, while offering a sacrifice Serranus had gotten some blood on his garments. Later that day, when Caligula had been murdered, the emperor's German bodyguards sought his assassin with their swords drawn. The first person they encountered was Serranus, and assuming the blood on his clothes was human, summarily slew him. Then they cut off his head and, with those of the assassins they had found and killed, paraded about with it.

Although the name of his wife is not known, Serranus is attested as having three sons: the rhetor Publius Nonius Asprenas; Publius Nonius Asperenas Caesianus; and Publius Nonius Asprenas Caesius Cassianus, suffect consul in either 72 or 73.

== Notes ==
Political offices
Preceded by Aulus Caecina Paetus; Gaius Caninius Rebilus as suffecti	Roman consul 38 (suffect) with Marcus Aquila Julianus	Succeeded by Servius Asinius Celer; Sextus Nonius Quinctilianus as suffecti
