= Furius Anthianus =

Furius Anthianus (or possibly Furius Anthus) was a jurisconsult of ancient Rome of uncertain date, though probably not later than the period of the emperor Alexander Severus, that is, the 3rd century AD.

Anthianus wrote a notable commentary on the Praetor's Edict, which is in the Florentine manuscript to the Digest (that is, the Littera Florentina). It is titled the Edict of Five Books (μέρος ἐδίκτου βιβλία πέντε), but there are only three extracts made from it in the Digest, and all of these are taken from the first book. This has led many to hold that the compilers of the Digest possessed only an imperfect copy of his work.
