= Kaddour M'Hamsadji =

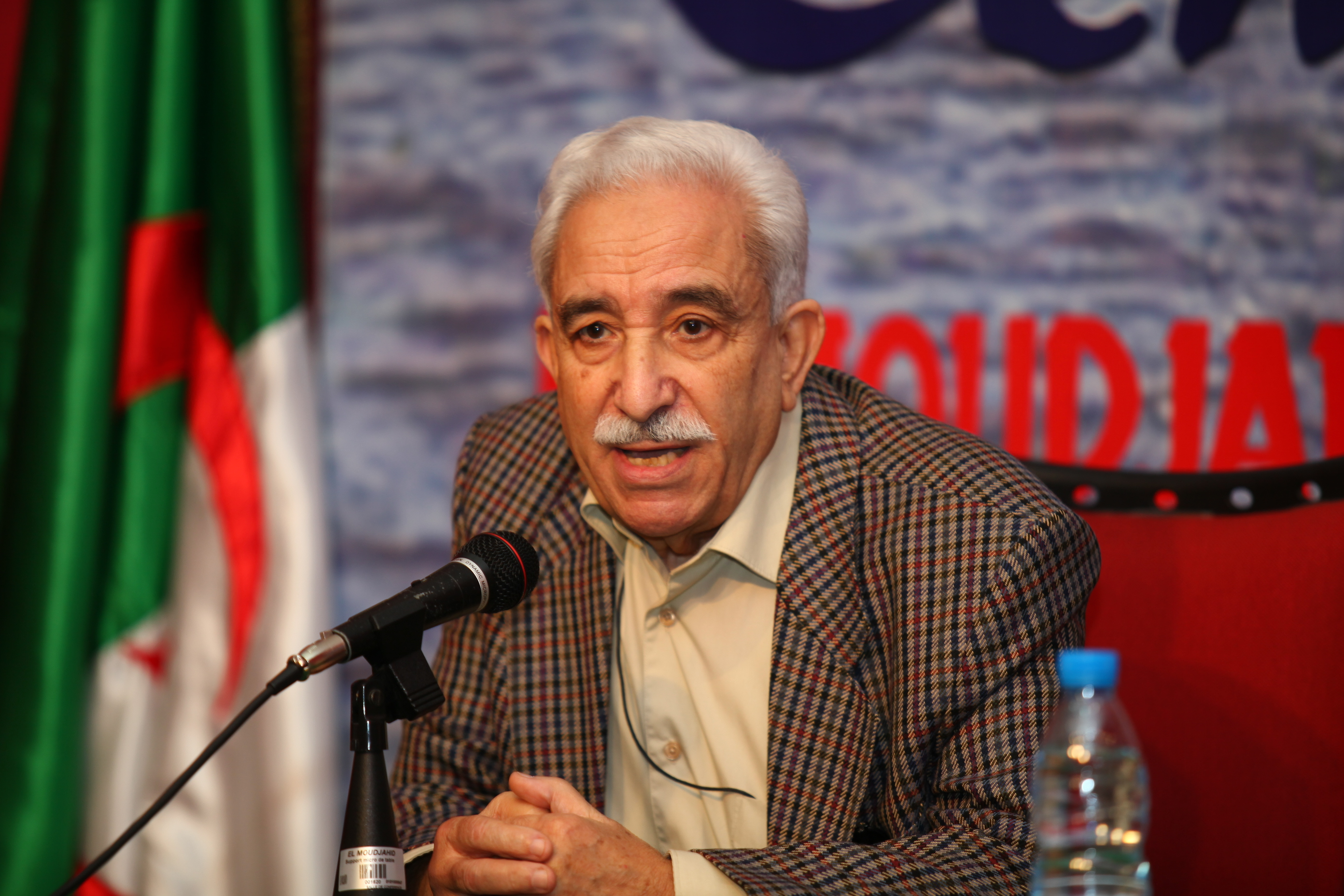
Kaddour M'Hamsadji-El Moujahid.

Kaddour M'Hamsadji, born in Sour El-Ghozlane, on 8 August 1933, is an Algerian writer of French and Arabic, author of novels, essays, short stories, plays, stories and poetry as well as Literary columnist (in various newspapers). He is the grandfather of the writer Anys Mezzaour.
