= Lucius Arruntius Camillus Scribonianus =

First century Roman senator and consul

Lucius Arruntius Camillus Scribonianus was a Roman senator, who was active during the reign of Tiberius. He was consul in AD 32. Ten years later, he revolted against the emperor Claudius, but was swiftly defeated.

== Family ==
Born Marcus Furius Camillus Scribonianus, the natural son of Marcus Furius Camillus, consul in AD 8, and brother of Livia Medullina Camilla, who had been betrothed to the future emperor Claudius, but fell ill and died suddenly on her wedding day. The Furii were an ancient patrician gens, and Camillus' namesake, Marcus Furius Camillus, was one of the greatest heroes of the early Republic, but by the first century his descendants had fallen into obscurity. Camillus' father was the first to achieve military fame in three hundred years, when as proconsul of Africa in AD 17, he defeated Tacfarinas and his allies, and was rewarded with the triumphal insignia by the emperor Tiberius.

Camillus was adopted by Lucius Arruntius, who had been consul in AD 6, and whose name he assumed in accordance with Roman custom, although some sources continued to refer to him as Furius Camillus Scribonianus, while others refer to him as Camillus Arruntius. Camillus' and his wife had two children: a son, who, like his father, is variously called Marcus Furius Camillus Scribonianus and Lucius Arruntius Camillus Scribonianus in different sources, and a daughter, Arruntia Camilla, known from inscriptions.

== Career ==
In AD 32, the year after the downfall of Sejanus, Camillus was consul with Gnaeus Domitius Ahenobarbus, father of the future emperor Nero. The year was marked by growing suspicion between Tiberius and the senate, and the prosecution of those whose loyalty was in doubt because of their association with Sejanus. The emperor declined a proposal that he should be accompanied by twenty armed senators, and banished Junius Gallio, who had proposed additional privileges for the praetorian guard; but he also spared some of the former intimates of Sejanus, whose association he deemed harmless. Camillus' consulship lasted for six months; on the Kalends of July he was replaced by Aulus Vitellius, who finished out the year with Ahenobarbus.

During the remainder of Tiberius' reign, Camillus' family faced increasing peril. His adoptive father, Lucius Arruntius, whom Augustus on his deathbed had described as a man fit to hold the empire, was twice accused. On the first occasion he was acquitted, and his accusers punished; on the second, when he was said to have conspired with Albucilla, he took his own life, even though his friends urged that the emperor, who was gravely ill, should die before Arruntius could be tried, for Arruntius knew the character of Caligula, and felt no comfort in the prospect of his accession.

When, four years later, Caligula fell at the hands of an assassin, Camillus, then governor of Dalmatia, was one of those considered as a possible successor. However, before the senate could act, the praetorian guard proclaimed Claudius emperor. Camillus, who was aware of his support among the senate, began making plans to contest the succession by force of arms.

== Revolt ==
In the following year, AD 42, Lucius Annius Vinicianus, who had also been considered for the throne, sought Camillus' support. Camillus agreed to rise against Claudius, and a number of legions went over to him. He promised to restore the senate to its former authority, which gave him the support of a number of the equites and many senators. Claudius considered abdicating in favour of Camillus, but was dissuaded when he sought the advice of leading men.

Although Camillus' army was sizeable, it contained a large number of provincials and untested soldiers, and soon fell into disarray. Suetonius describes a superstitious dread that had come over the legions that had taken Camillus' side, when they could not obtain the customary garlands and perfumes to adorn their standards, and then found that they could not remove them from the ground, a particularly ill omen. Within five days the rebellion was over, although it is not clear whether the two sides ever engaged in battle. With his army refusing to obey his orders, Camillus fled to the island of Issa, where he perished by his own hand.

== Aftermath ==
Within a few years after the failed revolt, Camillus' son was appointed an augur, and subsequently praefectus urbi. However, in AD 52, he and his mother were exiled, on a charge of having asked astrologers to predict the time of the emperor's death. The younger Camillus died not long afterward, some said by an illness, others by poison.

== Bibliography ==
- Publius Cornelius Tacitus, Annales, Historiae.
- Gaius Suetonius Tranquillus, De Vita Caesarum (Lives of the Caesars, or The Twelve Caesars).
- Lucius Cassius Dio Cocceianus (Cassius Dio), Roman History.
- Dictionary of Greek and Roman Biography and Mythology, William Smith, ed., Little, Brown and Company, Boston (1849).
- Paul von Rohden, Elimar Klebs, & Hermann Dessau, Prosopographia Imperii Romani (The Prosopography of the Roman Empire, abbreviated PIR), Berlin (1898).
- Barbara Levick, Claudius, Yale University Press (1990).
- Alison E. Cooley, The Cambridge Manual of Latin Epigraphy, Cambridge University Press (2012).

Political offices
Preceded by Tiberius V, and Sejanus	Consul of the Roman Empire; 32 with Gnaeus Domitius Ahenobarbus	Succeeded by Aulus Vitellius as Suffect consul
