= Mazippa =

- Born: Unknown; Roman North Africa
- Died: Unknown
- Occupations: Tribal leader; military commander
- Era: Early Roman Empire
- Known for: Alliance with Tacfarinas in the Gaetulian Revolt (c. 24 AD)
- Opponents: Roman Empire; Furius Camillus

Mazippa was the leader of the Moors, a Berber tribe of Roman North Africa during the Gaetulian Wars, around 24 AD. This revolt, in which he allied with Tacfarinas, a Roman auxiliary soldier of Roman North Africa, who turned brigand, and who rose to be leader of the Musulamii, a tribe of nomadic Berber people living in Aures during the Roman Empire. The revolt was the largest revolt against Roman rule in Algeria during the whole of the Roman occupation. .

Mazippas role in the revolt was said by Tacitus to have "ravaged the country and marked his way with fire and sword". The revolt was put down by Furius Camillus.
