= Lucius Nonius Calpurnius Torquatus Asprenas (suffect consul) =

1st century Roman senator, governor and suffect consul

Lucius Nonius Calpurnius Torquatus Asprenas was a Roman senator of the early Roman Empire, who flourished under the reigns of Nero and Vespasian. He was suffect consul around the year 78.

Asprenas is commonly identified as the son of the senator Asprenas Calpurnius Torquatus. His father was awarded the cognomen "Torquatus" and a golden torque by the emperor Augustus when he fell from his horse in the Trojan Games. As the cognomen was hereditary, it came to be part of Asprenas' name, and appears as part of the names of his descendants.

== Career ==
The cursus honorum of Asprenas is known from an inscription found at Lepcis Magna, which identifies him as the grandson of Lucius Nonius Asprenas, consul in AD 6 and three-time proconsular governor of Africa. The earliest office Asprenas is known to have held was as one of the tresviri monetalis, most likely in his teens. This was the most prestigious of the four boards that comprise the vigintiviri; assignment to this board was usually allocated to patricians or favored individuals. Also in his teens he was co-opted into the Salii Palatini, a collegium comprising 12 patrician youths. These appointments were followed at the age of 25 by his appointment as quaestor to the emperor; because the emperor is not named, Valerie Maxfield suggests he held this magistracy during the reign of Nero. Upon completion of this traditional Republican magistracy Asprenas would be enrolled in the Senate. He is also attested as one of the sevir equitum Romanorum of the annual review of the equites at Rome.

For unknown reasons this inscription records that Asprenas received dona militaria at this point, but the amount—comprising five coronae, eight hastae and four vexilla awarded to a man who held only the rank of quaestor—is unusual. Maxfield opines that these decorations were awarded for distinction in battle, but for suppression of civil conflict, specifically for a possible role suppressing the Pisonian conspiracy. Following this he became praetor peregrinus, responsible for overseeing lawsuits at Rome involving non-citizens. Once Asprenas had completed his duties as praetor, he was eligible to hold a number of important responsibilities.

The inscription from Lepcis Magna then notes he was governor of the combined province of Galatia, Paphlagonia, Pamphylia, and Pisidia; according to Tacitus he held this appointment in the year 69. His consulship followed. This inscription also attests that he became one of the septemviri epulones after his consulship. We also know he was proconsular governor of Africa, which Werner Eck has dated to 82/83. During this consulship, Nonius Asprenas became the patron of Lepcis Magna, as attested by this inscription.

== Family ==
Asprenas is known to have at least two children by an otherwise unattested woman named Arria. One was a son named Lucius Nonius Calpurnius Torquatus Asprenas, suffect consul in 94 and ordinary consul in 128. The second was a daughter, Calpurnia Arria (also referred to as Arria Calpurnia), who married Gaius Bellicius Natalis Gavidius Tebanianus, suffect consul in 87.
