= Lucius Nonius Asprenas (consul 36 BC) =

Roman politician and general

Lucius Nonius Asprenas was a Roman politician and general who fought with Julius Caesar and was elected consul suffectus in 36 BC.

== Biography ==
A novus homo of the late republic, and originally hailing from Picenum, Asprenas was elected to the office of praetor by 47 BC. Although having no obvious connections or political ties to Julius Caesar he held a proconsular command under Caesar in Africa during the civil war, holding the town of Thapsus with two legions in 46 BC. The following year he followed Caesar to Hispania, where he was given a command over the cavalry, possibly as a legate.

During the early years of the Second Triumvirate Asprenas was largely overlooked for military command, but eventually he was given a role in Caesar Octavianus’s war against Sextus Pompeius. He was rewarded for his services with his election as suffect consul in 36 BC. In 31 BC, Asprenas was elected as one of the Septemviri epulones.

He had at least one son, Lucius Nonius Asprenas, who was the father of Lucius Nonius Asprenas, the consul suffectus of AD 6. He also had a daughter, Nonia Polla, who married Lucius Volusius Saturninus.

== See also ==
- List of Roman consuls
- List of Roman generals

== Sources ==
- T. Robert S. Broughton, The Magistrates of the Roman Republic, Vol II (1952).
- Syme, Ronald, The Roman Revolution (1939)

Political offices
Preceded by L. Gellius Poplicola; Marcus Cocceius Nerva	Consul suffectus of the Roman Republic with Quintus Marcius; 36 BC	Succeeded by Sextus Pompeius; Lucius Cornificius
