= Lucius Nonius Asprenas (consul 6) =

1st century AD Roman Senator

Lucius Nonius Asprenas (fl. 1st century AD) was a Roman Senator who was active in the reigns of Augustus and Tiberius. Asprenas was appointed suffect consul to replace Lucius Arruntius on 1 July AD 6.

== Biography ==
A member of the gens Nonii, Asprenas was the son of Lucius Nonius Asprenas, an intimate friend of the emperor Augustus, and Quinctilia, a sister of Publius Quinctilius Varus. His brother was Sextus Nonius Quinctilianus, ordinary consul of the year 8.

In 4 BC, Nonius Asprenas served as a military tribune in Syria under his uncle Varus. In AD 9, Nonius Asprenas was serving as a consular legate in Germania again under Varus. When Varus and his legions perished at the Battle of the Teutoburg Forest, Asprenas was in command of two legions at Moguntiacum. Hearing news of the disaster, he led his two legions down the River Rhine to protect the winter camps and rescue the survivors of the battle. However, he was then accused of helping himself to the property of the dead officers.

The accusation did not hurt his career, for in AD 14/15, Nonius Asprenas won the sortition and became proconsular governor of Africa. The historian Tacitus reports that while he was governor, soldiers killed Sempronius Gracchus, then living in exile on the Kerkennah Islands which were part of Asprenas' province; while Tacitus implies the soldiers acted on Tiberius' orders, he notes an alternative version of the story states they were sent by Asprenas "on the authority of Tiberius, who had vainly hoped that the infamy of the murder might be shifted on Asprenas."

Following the trial and execution of Gnaeus Calpurnius Piso in AD 20, Asprenas asked in the Senate why Claudius was not included in an official vote of thanks to those who pursued justice in the death of Germanicus. "It was a probing question," writes Barbara Levick. She concludes, "Asprenas did not venture actually to propose the alteration of the vote of thanks, because he could not be sure how much support such a change would get, but his question showed a flag."

== Family ==
Nonius Asprenas married a daughter of Lucius Calpurnius Piso, Calpurnia L. Pisonis f., and they had three sons: Lucius Nonius Asprenas, suffect consul in AD 29; Publius Nonius Asprenas Calpurnius Serranus, ordinary consul in 38; and Nonius Asprenas Calpurnius Torquatus.

== Sources ==
- Syme, Ronald (1986). The Augustan Aristocracy. Oxford: Clarendon Press. ISBN 0-19-814859-3. OCLC 15488739.

Political offices
Preceded by Marcus Aemilius Lepidus, and Lucius Arruntius as Ordinary consuls	Suffect Consul of the Roman Empire; AD 6	Succeeded by Quintus Caecilius Metellus Creticus Silanus, and Aulus Licinius Nerva Silianus as Ordinary consuls
