= Cinithian =

Cinithians were an ancient Berber tribe of Roman North Africa, who occupied the area of modern tunisia.

Several inscriptions bear testimony of their presence. Near the Roman town of Githis, in southern Tunisia, there is a second-century dedication to The Empire and Memmius Pacatus, who 'stood out among his people'. Here he is called a 'Cinithius'. He was believed to be a leader of the tribe and his family went on to achieve senatorial rank.

At the veteran colony of Sitifis there is another inscription that mentions the tribe of the Cinithians.

They are also cited by Cornelius Tacitus as "...a nation by no means contemptible".
