= Lucius Nonius Asprenas (suspected poisoner) =

Close friend of Roman emperor Augustus

Lucius Nonius Asprenas was a Roman Senator active during the Principate. He was notorious for being prosecuted for poisoning a number of people at a dinner party.

== Biography ==
The son of Lucius Nonius Asprenas, the suffect consul of 36 BC, Asprenas was a member of the nobiles and an intimate friend of the emperor Augustus.

In around 9 BC, Nonius Asprenas was brought to trial after a number of his guests (reportedly some 130 people) died after attending a party which he hosted. Cassius Severus brought the charges against him, alleging that Asprenas had poisoned them. His defence was conducted by Gaius Asinius Pollio. Augustus expressed his concern over the charges in the Senate and made an appearance at court, but did not make any statement while present. Nevertheless, the emperor's auctoritas was sufficient to win an acquittal for Asprenas.

That charges had been brought against him was enough to ruin his political career; not only did he forfeit his seat as one of the Septemviri epulonum, but he also was prevented from contesting the consulship.

== Marriage and children ==
Nonius Asprenas married Quinctilla, a sister of Publius Quinctilius Varus. They had at least two sons. The first was Lucius Nonius Asprenas, the suffect consul of AD 6. The other was Sextus Nonius Quinctilianus, consul of AD 8, who might have been a biological son of Varus and his wife Vipsania.

== Sources ==
- Stern, Gaius (2006). Women, children, and senators on the Ara Pacis Augustae : a study of Augustus' vision of a New World Order in 13 BC. University of California, Berkeley. OCLC 892834012.
- Syme, Ronald (1986). The Augustan Aristocracy. Clarendon Press. ISBN 978-0-19-814859-3.
- Levick, Barbara (1999). Tiberius the Politician. Psychology Press. ISBN 978-0-415-21753-8.
