= Lucius Nonius Asprenas (consul 29) =

Early 1st century AD Roman senator and consul

Lucius Nonius Asprenas was a Roman senator who flourished during the early 1st century AD. He held the office of suffect consul in AD 29 as the colleague of Aulus Plautius. He was the oldest son of the Lucius Nonius Asprenas (who was suffect consul in AD 6) and Calpurnia, the daughter of Lucius Calpurnius Piso Caesoninus, consul in 15 BC. Asprenas the Younger had two brothers, Publius Nonius Asprenas Calpurnius Serranus, ordinary consul in AD 38, and Nonius Asprenas Calpurnius Torquatus.

Pliny the Elder notes that two of the sons of the elder Lucius Nonius Asprenas were afflicted with colic, which they cured by use of a crested lark: one took it as food, and wore its heart in a golden bracelet; the other sacrificed the bird in a shrine of unbaked bricks built in the shape of an oven. It is believed that the younger Lucius Nonius Asprenas was one of these brothers.

Asprenas was one of seven witnesses of the Senatus consultum de Cn. Pisone patre, the Roman Senate's official act concerning the trial and punishment of Gnaeus Calpurnius Piso. At the time Asprenas was a quaestor. As the act was published on 10 December AD 20, and because Roman law of the time dictated that quaestors had to be at least 24 years of age, it can deduced that Asprenas was born around 4 BC. His grave monument on the Via Flaminia mentions the other two offices held by Asprenas: suffect consul and augur.

Asprenas is known to have had at least one son, Lucius Nonius Calpurnius Asprenas, suffect consul around the year 72.

Political offices
Preceded by Gaius Fufius Geminus, and Lucius Rubellius Geminus	Suffect Consul of the Roman Empire; 29 with Aulus Plautius	Succeeded by Marcus Vinicius, and Lucius Cassius Longinus
