= Lucilius Longus =

Roman politician and senator

Lucilius Longus was a Roman politician and senator of the Roman Empire in the 1st century.

== Biography ==
Lucilius Longus (his Praenomen is unknown), was a homo novus and a friend of Tiberius. In 6 BC, He accompanied Tiberius into his self-imposed exile on Rhodes.

On 1 July AD 7, Lucilius was created suffect consul due to the death of the regular consul Aulus Licinius Nerva Silianus. He held the consulship together with Quintus Caecilius Metellus Creticus Silanus as his colleague.

After his death in AD 23, the Senate placed a statue of Lucilius in the Forum of Augustus.
