= Alison E. Cooley =

British historian of the Roman Empire (born 1970)

Academic background
- Education: University of Oxford
- Thesis: The role of inscribed monuments in transforming public space at Pompeii and Ostia

Academic work
- Discipline: Classics
- Sub-discipline: Epigraphy
- Institutions: University of Warwick

Alison E. Cooley is a British classicist specialising in Latin epigraphy. She is a professor at the University of Warwick, former head of its Department of Classics and Ancient History, and current deputy head (until April 2025). In 2004, she was awarded The Butterworth Memorial Teaching Award. Cooley is the President of the British Epigraphy Society.

== Life ==
Alison E. Cooley is a classicist specialising in Latin epigraphy. She qualified with a Master of Arts and a PhD at St John's College, University of Oxford, with a doctoral thesis titled The role of inscribed monuments in transforming public space at Pompeii and Ostia. She is professor of Roman history at the University of Warwick, former head of its Department of Classics and Ancient History, and current deputy head (until April 2025). In 2004, she was awarded The Butterworth Memorial Teaching Award. Cooley is the President of the British Epigraphy Society. She is the honorary publications officer for the Centre for the Study of Ancient Documents (CSAD) at Oxford. From 2013 to 2017 she led an AHRC project, the Ashmolean Latin Inscriptions Project. She has served two three-year terms on the Council of the Society for the Promotion of Roman Studies.

== Writing ==
Cooley has published widely on epigraphy as well as organising conferences on the topic. Bohdan Chernyukh, writing in Censurae Librorum, praised the "meticulous analysis and description of the inscriptions" in Cooley's Cambridge Manual of Latin Epigraphy (2012). The Bryn Mawr Classical Review said of the second edition (2014) of her sourcebook on Pompeii and Herculaneum that it was "an essential resource for anyone researching or teaching about Pompeii".

== Selected publications ==
- Pompeii: A Sourcebook, Routledge, London, 2004. (with M.G.L. Cooley) (Second edition 2014 as Pompeii and Herculaneum: A Sourcebook)
- Res Gestae divi Augusti, edition with introduction, translation, and commentary. Cambridge University Press, Cambridge, 2009.
- "History and Inscriptions, Rome" in The Oxford History of Historical Writing, Vol. 1, eds. A. Feldherr & G. Hardy. Oxford University Press, Oxford, 2011, pp. 244–64.
- The Cambridge Manual of Latin Epigraphy, Cambridge University Press, Cambridge, 2012. ISBN 9780521549547
- The Senatus consultum de Cn. Pisone Patre, Cambridge University Press, Cambridge, 2023. ISBN 9781108714563
