= Naevia gens =

Ancient Roman family

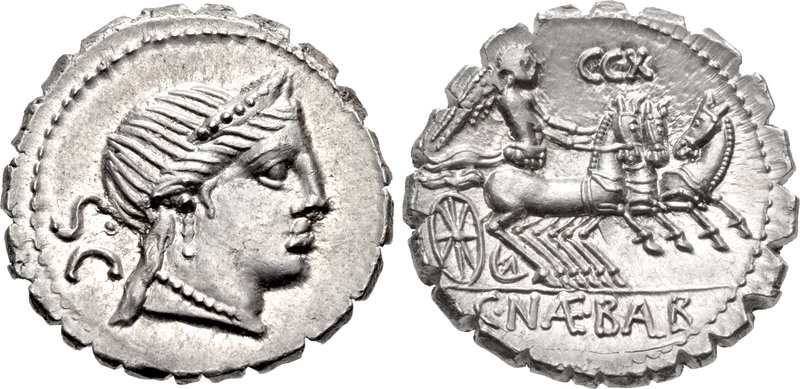
Denarius of Gaius Naevius Balbus, 79 BC. The obverse depicts Venus, the patron goddess of Sulla, while Victoria drives a triga on the reverse, alluding to Sulla's victory games.

The gens Naevia, occasionally written Navia, was a plebeian family at ancient Rome. Members of this gens are first mentioned at the time of the Second Punic War, but the first of the Naevii to obtain the consulship was Lucius Naevius Surdinus, in AD 30.

== Origin ==
The nomen Naevius is generally regarded as a patronymic surname derived from the praenomen Gnaeus, indicating a birthmark. Gnaeus and naevus, the usual form of the Latin word for a birthmark, were pronounced similarly, and a number of other Latin words could be spelled with either gn- or n-, such as gnatus and natus, "born".

== Branches and cognomina ==
In the time of the Republic, the principal cognomina of the Naevii were Balbus and Matho. Balbus, a common surname, originally signified one who stammers. Chase regarded Matho as a borrowing of the Greek Μαθων. Cicero stated that it was pronounced Mato, and sometimes spelled without an 'h'. Other Naevii bore the surnames Crista, Pollio, and Turpio, while Capella and Surdinus are found on coins. Crista refers to a crest or plume; Pollio is thought to mean "polisher", and to refer to the occupation of polishing arms. Turpio describes someone ugly, deformed, or foul. Capella refers to a she-goat, while Surdinus probably described someone who was deaf, hard of hearing, stubborn, or silent.

== Members ==
This list includes abbreviated praenomina. For an explanation of this practice, see filiation.

- Gnaeus Naevius, a poet and dramatist of the Old Latin period.
- Quintus Naevius Crista, a prefect of the allied forces, under the command of Marcus Valerius Laevinus, served with courage and skill against Philip during the First Macedonian War, in 214 BC.
- Quintus Naevius, (Note: Navius in manuscripts of Livy.) a centurion serving under the proconsul Quintus Fulvius Flaccus at the siege of Capua in 211 BC, during the Second Punic War. Naevius displayed conspicuous bravery and tactical skill in helping to repel Hannibal's forces. He might be the same person as Quintus Naevius Crista.
- Quintus Naevius Matho, appointed one of the triumvirs for establishing a colony in Bruttium, in 194 BC. Praetor in 184, he received the province of Sardinia. Before setting out for his province, Matho was instructed to investigate all reports of poisoning in Italy, an endeavour which occupied him for four months. Valerias Antias states that two thousand people were condemned in the course of the investigation.
- Marcus Naevius, tribune of the plebs in 184 BC, was, according to some authorities, induced by Cato the Elder to accuse Scipio Africanus of having accepted a bribe from Antiochus in exchange for lenient treatment at the end of the Syrian War. (Note: Other sources assign this accusation to Quintus Petillius, and his cousin, Quintus Petillius Spurinus, tribunes of the plebs in 187 BC.)
- Lucius Naevius Balbus, one of the quinqueviri (Note: A committee of five men.) appointed in 168 BC to resolve a dispute over the lands claimed by the inhabitants of Pisae and the Lunenses.
- Gaius Naevius Balbus, triumvir monetalis in 79 BC, was a supporter of Sulla and may have been a prefect in Sulla's army at the Battle of the Colline Gate in 82. (Note: Broughton (vol. II, p. 72) believes that the prefect, only named Balbus by Plutarch, belonged to the gens Octavia.)
- Naevius Turpio, a quadruplator, or public informer, who in 75 BC was condemned by Gaius Licinius Sacerdos, while the latter was propraetor in Sicily. During the administration of Verres, Naevius was instrumental in helping to extract all that the new praetor could from his province.
- Naevius Pollio, an extremely tall man, whom Cicero is said to have described as being a foot taller than the tallest man who ever lived. (Note: Thus according to Columella; this description is not contained in any of Cicero's surviving works, but presumably was in the lost Admiranda.) A similar description was given by Pliny the Elder.
- Sextus Naevius, the accuser of Publius Quinctius, whose defence by Cicero was the subject of the oration Pro Quinctio.
- Servius Naevius, accused by Cicero, was defended by Gaius Scribonius Curio.
- Lucius Naevius L. f. Surdinus, triumvir monetalis in 15 BC. He was praetor circa 10 BC and consul suffectus in AD 30.
- Gaius Naevius Capella, quadriumvir monetalis in 4 BC.
- Lucius Naevius Surdinus, consul suffectus from July to December in AD 30.
- Quintus Naevius Cordus Sutorius Macro, praetorian prefect under the emperors Tiberius and Caligula.
- Ennia Naevia, according to Suetonius, was the wife of Macro and the mistress of Caligula. (Note: According to other sources, her name was Ennia Thrasylla.) Although Macro was said to have murdered Tiberius in order to bring Caligula to the throne, the new emperor had him and Ennia put to death, so that he would not be under obligation to them.
- Lucius Naevius Aquilinus, consul in AD 249.

== See also ==
- List of Roman gentes

== Bibliography ==
- Marcus Tullius Cicero, Brutus, De Oratore, Pro Quinctio.
- Titus Livius (Livy), Ab Urbe Condita (History of Rome).
- Valerius Maximus, Factorum ac Dictorum Memorabilium (Memorable Facts and Sayings).
- Lucius Junius Moderatus Columella, De Re Rustica.
- Gaius Plinius Secundus (Pliny the Elder), Naturalis Historia (Natural History).
- Sextus Julius Frontinus, Strategemata (Stratagems).
- Publius Cornelius Tacitus, Annales.
- Gaius Suetonius Tranquillus, De Vita Caesarum (Lives of the Caesars, or The Twelve Caesars).
- Lucius Mestrius Plutarchus (Plutarch), Lives of the Noble Greeks and Romans.
- Aulus Gellius, Noctes Atticae (Attic Nights).
- Lucius Cassius Dio Cocceianus (Cassius Dio), Roman History.
- Sextus Aurelius Victor, De Viris Illustribus (On Famous Men).
- Joseph Hilarius Eckhel, Doctrina Numorum Veterum (The Study of Ancient Coins, 1792–1798).
- Henricus Meyerus, Oratorum Romanorum Fragmenta ab Appio inde Caeco usque ad Q. Aurelium Symmachum (Fragments of Roman Orators from Appius Claudius Caecus to Quintus Aurelius Symmachus), L. Bourgeois-Mazé, Paris (1837).
- Dictionary of Greek and Roman Biography and Mythology, William Smith, ed., Little, Brown and Company, Boston (1849).
- Theodor Mommsen et alii, Corpus Inscriptionum Latinarum (The Body of Latin Inscriptions, abbreviated CIL), Berlin-Brandenburgische Akademie der Wissenschaften (1853–present).
- George Davis Chase, "The Origin of Roman Praenomina", in Harvard Studies in Classical Philology, vol. VIII (1897).
- Harold Mattingly, Edward Allen Sydenham, C. H. V. Sutherland et alii, The Roman Imperial Coinage, London (1923–1984).
- T. Robert S. Broughton, The Magistrates of the Roman Republic, American Philological Association (1952).
- Attilio Degrassi, I fasti consolari dell'Impero Romano dal 30 avanti Cristo al 613 dopo Cristo (The Consular Fasti of Imperial Rome from 30 BC to AD 613), Edizioni di storia e letteratura, Rome (1952).
- Michael Crawford, Roman Republican Coinage, Cambridge University Press (1974, 2001).
- John C. Traupman, The New College Latin & English Dictionary, Bantam Books, New York (1995).
