= Gaius Pomponius Graecinus =

Roman senator and consul active during the reign of Tiberius

Gaius (or Publius) Pomponius Graecinus was a Roman politician who was suffect consul in AD 16 as the colleague of Gaius Vibius Rufus. He was probably a novus homo raised to the Senate by Augustus. He was a friend and patron of the poet Ovid, who addressed three letters of his Epistulae ex Ponto ("Letters from the Black Sea") to him around AD 10.

He married Asinia, daughter of Vipsania Agrippina and Gaius Asinius Gallus Saloninus. Pomponia Graecina, wife of Aulus Plautius, was probably his daughter or granddaughter by Asinia. He, or his brother, Lucius Pomponius Flaccus, who was consul in 17 and later imperial Syrian governor in 35, may have married Vistilia (mother of empress Milonia Caesonia) and had two sons: Publius Pomponius Secundus and Quintus Pomponius Secundus.

== See also ==
- Pomponia gens

Political offices
Preceded by Sisenna Statilius Taurus, and Lucius Scribonius Libo as ordinary consuls	Suffect consul of the Roman Empire; 16 with Gaius Vibius Rufus	Succeeded by Lucius Pomponius Flaccus, and Gaius Caelius Rufus as ordinary consuls
