= Lucius Pomponius Flaccus =

1st century Roman senator, consul and provincial governor

Lucius Pomponius Flaccus (died 33) was a Roman senator, who held a number of imperial appointments during the reign of Tiberius. He was consul in AD 17 with Gaius Caelius Rufus as his colleague.

Flaccus was the brother of Gaius Pomponius Graecinus, consul the year before in 16. Either he or his brother may have married Vistilia, mother of Milonia Caesonia, the wife of Caligula, and had two sons: Publius Pomponius Secundus and Quintus Pomponius Secundus.

== Life ==
The earliest mention of Flaccus was by the poet Ovid, who addressed one of the earliest poems from Epistulae ex Ponto to Flaccus; Ronald Syme dates the first three books of Ex Ponto "before the autumn of 13". More information about Flaccus comes from a poem Ovid addressed to his brother Graecinus: Syme uses the evidence of that poem to argue that Flaccus was legatus or assistant from either the year 11 or 12 to Gaius Poppaeus Sabinus, then governor of Moesia.

He is mentioned several times by Tacitus in his Annales. The first time is in the year 16, after the successful prosecution of Marcus Scribonius Libo for treason and his subsequent suicide. Flaccus made the motion in the Senate that days of public thanksgiving be appointed to commemorate the quashing of this act of treason.

The following year Flaccus was appointed governor of the imperial province of Moesia. There, according to Syme, he demonstrated his diplomatic craft. Flaccus outwitted Rhescuporis, king of Thrace, who had slain his nephew Cotys III and seized his lands. Flaccus convinced Rhescuporis to leave his kingdom and enter Roman territory; there he was surrounded by what was first described to him as an "honor guard", but was soon revealed a detail of soldiers to hold him prisoner. Rhescuporis was escorted to Rome where he was tried for the murder of his nephew.

His tenure as governor of Syria, from the year 32 to 33, although brief, is the best documented portion of his life. According to Suetonius, Flaccus and Lucius Calpurnius Piso Caesoninus joined the emperor Tiberius in a combined feast and drinking bout that lasted two entire days and the intervening night. At the conclusion of this debauchery, Tiberius appointed Flaccus governor of Syria and Piso Urban Prefect. While governor, Flaccus provided sanctuary to Herod Agrippa, who had been driven out of the Tetrarchy by king Herod Antipas. Tacitus notes in passing his death in office the following year.

Political offices
Preceded by Gaius Vibius Rufus, and Gaius Pomponius Graecinus as suffect consuls	Suffect consul of the Roman Empire; 17 with Gaius Caelius Rufus	Succeeded by Gaius Vibius Marsus, and Lucius Voluseius Proculus as suffect consuls
