= Publius Pomponius Secundus =

First century Roman politician, poet and writer

Publius Pomponius Secundus was a distinguished statesman and poet in the reigns of Tiberius, Caligula, and Claudius. He was suffect consul for the nundinium of January to June 44, succeeding the ordinary consul Gaius Sallustius Crispus Passienus and as the colleague of the other ordinary consul, Titus Statilius Taurus. Publius was on intimate terms with the elder Pliny, who wrote a biography of him, now lost.

== Name ==
His full name was Publius Calvisius Sabinus Pomponius Secundus, as indicated by two fragmentary inscriptions from Germania Superior. For some time, Pomponius' praenomen was uncertain; Publius was not a regular name of the Pompilii, and Olli Salomies discusses the possibility that it might have been Gaius, but notes that a Publius Calvisius Sabinus was attested as existing in Spoletium, and concludes that it is "possible to assume with some confidence" that he had been adopted by a Publius Calvisius Sabinus. That his praenomen was Publius, at least after his adoption, seems to be confirmed by an inscription from Veii, dating from his consulship, another from Cyrenae, when he was proconsul, and a third from Mogontiacum, when he was Legatus Augusti pro praetore.

== Family ==
Pomponius' mother was Vistilia, who by other marriages was the mother of Publius Suillius Rufus and the general Gnaeus Domitius Corbulo. The name of his father is not known, but Ronald Syme has suggested he could be either Gaius Pomponius Graecinus, consul suffectus in AD 16, or his brother, Lucius Pomponius Flaccus, consul ordinarius in 17. Pomponius' brother, Quintus Pomponius Secundus, was involved in various intrigues during the reigns of Tiberius and Claudius. Quintus tried to protect his brother from Tiberius' displeasure.

== Political career ==
Pomponius was a friend of Sejanus, who served as consul in 31. Upon the latter's denunciation and execution in October of that year, mobs hunted down and killed anyone they could link to Sejanus. Pomponius was placed under house arrest by Tiberius, where he remained until 37.

Tiberius died in 37, and his successor Caligula promptly released Pomponius from prison and appointed him as governor of the senatorial province of Creta et Cyrenaica. Caligula married Caesonia, Pomponius' half-sister, in 40, but he was assassinated in late January 41.

Upon Caligula's death, Claudius appointed Pomponius' brother, Quintus Pomponius Secundus as consul (Caligula had been Consul of Rome, as well as emperor, at the time of his assassination). Pomponius himself, who was still serving as governor of Creta et Cyrenaica province, served also as consul from January until June of 44.

Pomponius continued to serve as governor of the Creta et Cyrenaica until 50, at which time Claudius appointed him as governor and legatus of Germania Superior. In 50, Pomponius led the Roman legions to victory against the Chatti and freed the survivors of the Battle of the Teutoburg Forest after forty years of slavery. For this, he was decreed the honour of a ornamenta triumphalia. He served as governor of Germania Superior until 54. This was the final mention of Pomponius in the historical record, except by the Plinies.

== Writings ==
It was by his tragedies that Secundus obtained the most celebrity. They are spoken of in the highest terms by Tacitus, Quintilian, and the younger Pliny, and were read even in a much later age, as one of them is quoted by the grammarian Charisius. These tragedies were first put on the stage in the time of Claudius. Quintilian asserts that he was far superior to any writer of tragedies he had known, and Tacitus expresses a high opinion of his literary abilities.

Secundus devoted much attention to the niceties of grammar and style, on which he was recognized as an authority. His subject matter was Greek, with one known exception, a praetexta called Aeneas. Tragedians in the Julio-Claudian and Flavian periods typically were men of relatively high social status, and their works often expressed their political views under an insufficient veil of fiction. Only a few lines of his work remain, some of which belong to Aeneas.

== See also ==
- Pomponia gens
- Calvisia gens

== Bibliography ==
- Gaius Plinius Secundus (Pliny the Elder), Historia Naturalis (Natural History).
- Marcus Fabius Quintilianus (Quintilian), Institutio Oratoria (Institutes of Oratory).
- Gaius Plinius Caecilius Secundus (Pliny the Younger), Epistulae (Letters).
- Publius Cornelius Tacitus, Annales, Dialogus de Oratoribus (Dialogue on Oratory).
- Lucius Cassius Dio Cocceianus (Cassius Dio), Roman History.
- Flavius Sosipater Charisius, Ars Grammatica (The Art of Grammar).
- Friedrich Heinrich Bothe, Poëtae Scenici Latinorum Fragmenta (Fragments of the Latin Theatrical Poets), Heinrich Vogler, Halberstadt (1822).
- Dictionary of Greek and Roman Biography and Mythology, William Smith, ed., Little, Brown and Company, Boston (1849).
- Theodor Mommsen et alii, Corpus Inscriptionum Latinarum (The Body of Latin Inscriptions, abbreviated CIL), Berlin-Brandenburgische Akademie der Wissenschaften (1853–present).
- René Cagnat et alii, L'Année épigraphique (The Year in Epigraphy, abbreviated AE), Presses Universitaires de France (1888–present).
- Otto Ribbeck, Geschichte der römischen Dichtung, vol. iii. (1892); Tragicorum Romanorum fragmenta (1897).
- Martin Schanz, Geschichte der römischen Literatur, vol. ii, p. 2 (1900).
- Wilhelm Siegmund Teuffel, History of Roman Literature (Eng. trans.), pp. 284, 287 (1900).
- Ronald Syme, "Domitius Corbulo", in Journal of Roman Studies, vol. 60 (1970).
- Werner Eck, "Über die prätorischen Prokonsulate in der Kaiserzeit. Eine quellenkritische Überlegung" (Concerning the Praetorian Proconsulate of the Imperial Period: a Source-Critical Consideration), in Zephyr, vol. 23/24, pp. 246 ff. (1972/1973).
- Paul A. Gallivan, "The Fasti for the Reign of Claudius", in Classical Quarterly, vol. 28, pp. 407–426 (1978).
- Olli Salomies, Adoptive and Polyonymous Nomenclature in the Roman Empire, Societas Scientiarum Fennica, Helsinki (1992).
- Vasily Rudich, Political Dissidence under Nero, Routledge, (1993).
- Gian Biagio Conte, Latin Literature: A History, JHU Press (1999).

Political offices
| Preceded by Gaius Sallustius Crispus Passienus II, and Titus Statilius Taurus as Ordinary consuls | Suffect consul of the Roman Empire; 44 with Titus Statilius Taurus | Succeeded by ignoti, then Marcus Vinicius II, and Titus Statilius Taurus Corvinus as Ordinary consuls |
