= Arch of Drusus =

Ancient Roman arch, a landmark of Rome, Italy

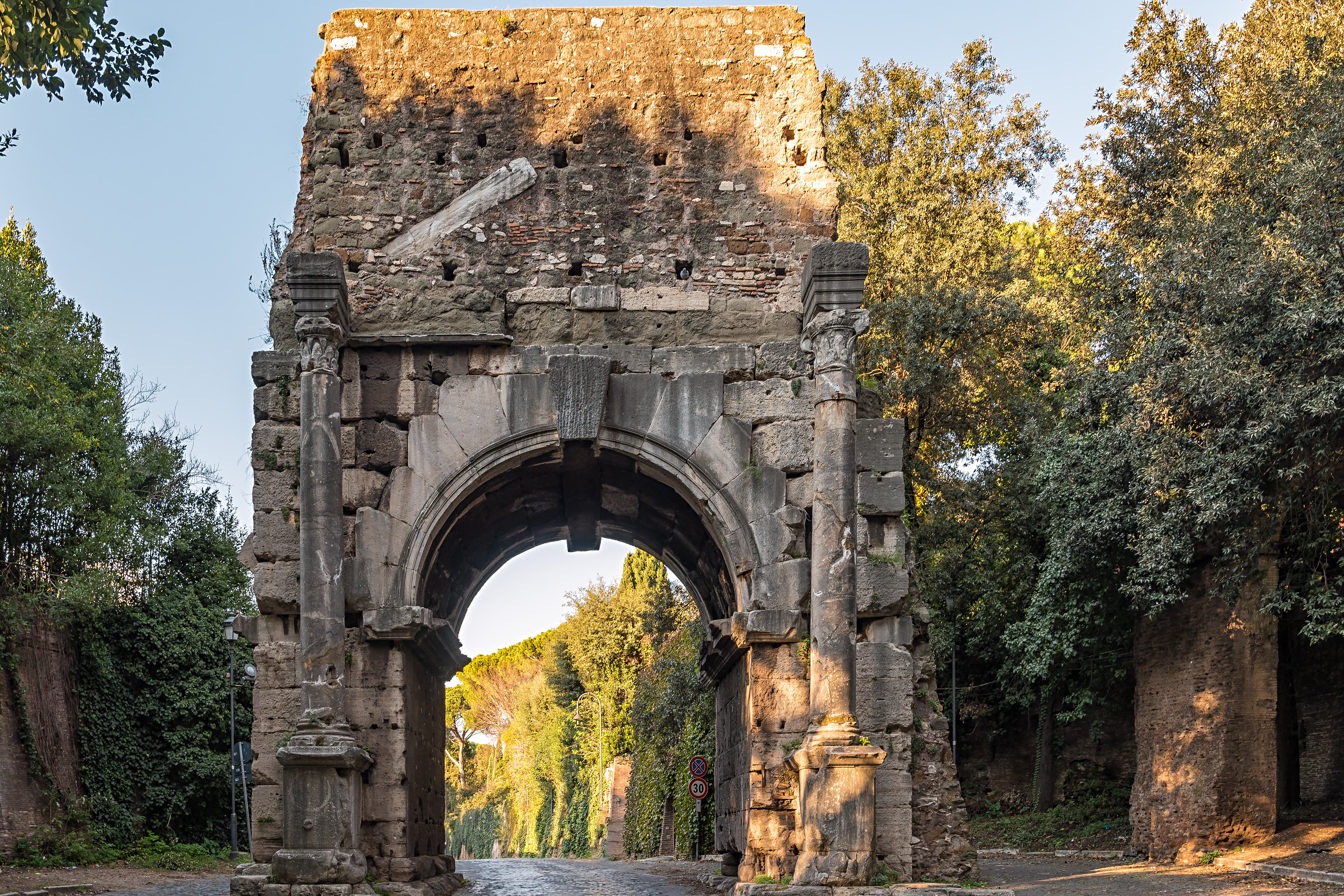
- Arch of Drusus today

- Shown within Augustan Rome
- Click on the map for a fullscreen view
- 41°52′25″N 12°30′04″E
- Location: Rome

The Arch of Drusus is an ancient arch in Rome, Italy, close to the First Mile of the Appian Way and next to the Porta San Sebastiano. Long misidentified, it is most likely the remains of the Arch of Trajan.

== History ==
The exact origins of the current Arch are disputed. It is now generally agreed that it has nothing to do with Nero Claudius Drusus, the conqueror of the Germans. The original Arch of Drusus was erected by the Senate in honour of Drusus following his death in 9 BCE, and spanned the Via Appia. Its exact location is not certain, but this arch no longer exists.

Regarding the current arch, some versions have this arch being constructed as part of a spur added to the Aqua Marcia by Caracalla in 211–216 AD, to take water from that aqueduct to Caracalla's new baths. It appears more likely that the arch pre-dated the aqueduct and that the aqueduct was conveniently routed over the top of the arch.

Only the central part of this arch is now standing, but it was originally triple, or at least with projections on each side, although never finished. It is built of travertine, faced with marble, and on each side of the archway are columns of Numidian marble with white marble bases. The archway is 7.21 metres high.

The Aqua Antoniniana, a branch of the Aqua Marcia aqueduct, ran over this arch. The brick-faced concrete that is visible on the top seems to belong to a later period. As a number of the features of the arch, such as the pediment and the free-standing columns are Trajanic features, it is very probable that the arch is what remains of the Arch of Trajan.

The Einsiedeln Itinerary written in the 9th century refers to a Arcus Recordationis situated near the Baths of Caracalla; this may be a reference to the original Arch of Drusus.

== See also ==
- Arch of Gallienus – Ancient Roman arch, a landmark of Rome, Italy
- List of Roman triumphal arches
- List of ancient monuments in Rome

Preceded by Arch of Constantine	Landmarks of Rome; Arch of Drusus	Succeeded by Arch of Janus
