= Gaius Vibius Rufinus =

1st century AD Roman senator, consul and governor

Gaius Vibius Rufinus was a Roman senator, who flourished during the early first century. He was suffect consul as the colleague of Marcus Cocceius Nerva in August of a year during the first half of the first century; which year is still in dispute. Rufinus was an acquaintance of the poet Ovid, who addressed two of his poems to him from his exile in Tomis.

== Date of his consulship ==
Some scholars, such as Attilio Degrassi, date the consulship of Rufinus and Nerva based on the attested dates the former was governor of Germania Superior, namely the years 43 and 45. Paul Gallivan, in his study of the suffect consuls of the reign of Claudius, reasoned from those dates that "Rufinus must have assumed the consulship between 39 and 42", for which only 40 and 41 have vacancies in August.

Other experts date their consulship to either 21 or 22, where there are corresponding gaps; no suffect consuls are yet attested for the year 21. Ronald Syme, who argues for one of these years, points out that Nerva was curator aquarum in the year 24, an office which required the consulship first. That Vibius Rufinus' father, Gaius Vibius Rufus, was consul himself not more than 6 years before, is not an insurmountable problem, for Rufus at the time of his consulship was elderly, and the gap in years between his consulship and Rufinus' would have been small. While the 21 years between consulship and being appointed governor of Germania Superior might present an objection to this earlier date, Syme observes that "C. Vibius Marsus (suff. 17) succeeding P. Petronius (suff. 19) in Syria, in or about the year 42."

== Life ==
Rufinus was the son of Vibius Rufus and Publilia M.f., who had been at a young age the second wife of the orator Cicero. Pliny the Elder mentions Rufinus as the author of a work in six books on trees, herbs, and flowers.

Syme interprets Ovid's poems to indicate Rufinus had been active in the Batonian War, which transpired from AD 6 to the year 9. If so, his role in that conflict is unclear: in different papers Syme speculated that Rufinus had been a military tribune, a quaestor or a legate of quaestorian rank. Syme speculates whether this military experience might explain his appointment to the important province of Germania Superior "many years later, although military experience was a recommendation less powerful than loyalty."

Besides the governorship of Germania Superior, the other office Rufinus is known to have held was governor of Asia. Starting with the earlier pair of possible dates for his consulship, Syme notes that for the proconsular governorship of Asia and Africa "Tiberius tried for a time to keep to an interval of ten years from a man's consulship", and assigns Rufinus' governorship to 36/7; this was the same term of governorship that Tiberius barred Gaius Sulpicius Galba from holding.
