= Coelia (disambiguation) =

Coelia is a genus of orchids.

Coelia may also refer to:

- Coelia Concordia, a Vestal Virgin
- Coelia gens, ancient Roman family
