= Gaius Vibius Rufus =

Roman senator, consul and orator active during the reign of Tiberius

Gaius Vibius Rufus was a Roman senator and orator, who flourished during the Principate. He was suffect consul in the second half of AD 16 with Gaius Pomponius Graecinus as his colleague. The first of his family to achieve consular rank, Rufus was a homo novus, one of ten in the first five years of the reign of Tiberius.

Ronald Syme notes both inscriptions which attest to his consulate misrepresent his name. In the Fasti Antiates Minores, his name appears as "C. Vibius Libo". Syme explains the person who carved this inscription accidentally repeated "Libo" from the name on the line above: L. Scribonius Libo. The second is in the Fasti Ostienses, where he is presented as "[C. Vibius] Rufinus"; in this case, the engraver was distracted by the name on the next line, "C. Pomponius Graecinus."

== Life ==
His family origins are unclear. "Every region of Italy avows its Vibii, normally obscure," writes Syme. Dio Cassius preserves two anecdotes about Rufus. One is that he acquired the curule chair once owned by Julius Caesar. The other is that he married the second wife and widow of the orator Cicero, Publilia. An inscription found near Tusculum names a freedman of the married couple, providing further evidence of their marriage: "M. Publilius Publiliae et C. Vibi Rufi l. Strato." Syme notes that Publilia was wealthy, and that marrying for wealth was common in their time, providing examples contemporary to Rufus and Publilia. Although the praenomen of her father is known, Syme comments, "It is perhaps unfortunate, but no great loss, that her wealthy father Marcus should elude discovery."

Between the unknown date of this marriage, and his consulate, Rufus established himself as an orator: Seneca the Younger mentions him almost thirty times in his writings. According to Syme, "Specimens quoted show directness, and a lack of metaphor, paradox, or subtlety."

By the time Rufus achieved the consulate, he was an elderly man. Another inscription attests that a few years after he stepped down from that office, Rufus was appointed president of the curatores riparum et alvei Tiberis, one of the officials responsible for public works inside the city, regulating the Tiber and the maintenance of Rome's sanitation system; this board was created in response to a severe flood the year prior to Rufus' consulship. Ronald Syme mentions the possibility that after he completed his duties on that board Rufus might have also been appointed curator aquarum between Gaius Fonteius Capito and Marcus Cocceius Nerva.

Vibius Rufus and Publilia are known to have had at least one son, Gaius Vibius Rufinus, suffect consul in either the year 21 or 22.

Political offices
Preceded by Sisenna Statilius Taurus, and Lucius Scribonius Libo as ordinary consuls	Suffect consul of the Roman Empire; AD 16 with Gaius Pomponius Graecinus	Succeeded by Lucius Pomponius Flaccus, and Gaius Caelius Rufus as ordinary consuls
