= Gaius Marcius Censorinus =

Gaius Marcius Censorinus can refer to:

- Gaius Marcius Censorinus (Marian), general who fought against Sulla
- Gaius Marcius Censorinus (consul 8 BC)
