= Vistilia gens =

Ancient Roman family

The gens Vistilia or Vestilia was a minor plebeian family at ancient Rome. They occur in history during the early part of the first century, and became connected with the imperial family. Only one member of this gens is known to have held any of the higher offices of the Roman state: Sextus Vistilius, who attained the praetorship, was a contemporary and friend of Drusus the Elder.

== Origin ==
The Vistilii likely came from Umbria, in northern Italy. In his study of Annals I through VI, Ronald Syme lists several inscriptions bearing the names of different Vistilii from that region. Other Vistilii are mentioned in inscriptions from Latium and Campania.

== Praenomina ==
All of the Vistilii known from history and epigraphy bore the praenomina Sextus or Gaius.

== Members ==
This list includes abbreviated praenomina. For an explanation of this practice, see filiation.

- Sextus Vistilius, praetor, and a friend of Nero Claudius Drusus.
- Vistilia, the mother of Milonia Caesonia, the wife of Caligula, and Roman empress from AD 38 to 41.
- Vistilia Sex. f., a prostitute.
- Gaius Vistilius, named in a sepulchral inscription from Rome, dating from the latter half of the first century BC.
- Gaius Vistilius C. l. Lep[...], a freedman buried in an Augustan era tomb at Interamna Nahars in Umbria, along with the freedwomen Vistilia Ruf[...] and Aerisina Prima.
- Vistilia C. l. Ruf[...], a freedwoman buried in an Augustan era tomb at Interamna Nahars, along with the freedman Gaius Vistilius Lep[...] and the freedwoman Aerisina Prima.
- Sextus Vistilius Sex. l. Zenae, a freedman named in a sepulchral inscription from Rome.
- Sextus Vistilius Sex. l. Felix, a freedman buried in a first-century tomb at Rome.
- Sextus Vistilius Helenus, a youth buried at Rome, in a tomb dating from the first half of the first century.
- Gaius Vistilius C. f. Rufus, named in an inscription from Syracuse in Sicily, dating from the first half of the first century.
- Vestilia Hostili[...], named in an inscription from Pompeii in Campania.
- Gaius Vistilius Primigenius, dedicated a late first-century tomb at Rome for his daughter, Vistilia Fortunata.
- Vistilia C. f. Fortunata, a young woman buried at Rome, aged thirteen years, nine months, and four days, in a tomb built by her father, Gaius Vistilius Primigenius, dating from the last quarter of the first century.
- Gaius Vistilius Annaeus, buried in a first- or second-century tomb built by Gaius Vistilius Miles for himself and Annaeus at Ameria in Umbria.
- Sextus Vistilius Sex. l. Bathyllus, a freedman, and one of the seviri Augustales, buried at Iguvium in Umbria, in a tomb dating from the second century, or the latter half of the first.
- Sextus Vestilius D[...], along with Aulus Egrilius Eutychus, dedicated a tomb for Vestilia Ti[...] at Ostia in Latium, dating between the middle of the first century and the end of the second.
- Vestilia Ti[...], buried at Ostia, in a tomb built by Aulus Egrilius Eutychus and Sextus Vestilius D[...], dating between the middle of the first century and the end of the second.
- Sextus Vestilius Lycysus, buried at Salernum in Campania, along with Quirinia Januaria, probably his wife, in a tomb dedicated by their client, Marcus Quirinius Hermes, and dating between the late first century and the end of the second.
- Vistilia Ɔ. f. Flora, a freedwoman buried at Ameria, in a second- or third-century tomb built by the freedman Sextus Roscius Gelos, perhaps her husband.
- Vestilia Hieronica, a woman buried in a family sepulchre at Portus in Latium, dating from the latter half of the second century, or the first half of the third.

== See also ==
- List of Roman gentes

== Bibliography ==
- Theodor Mommsen et alii, Corpus Inscriptionum Latinarum (The Body of Latin Inscriptions, abbreviated CIL), Berlin-Brandenburgische Akademie der Wissenschaften (1853–present).
- René Cagnat et alii, L'Année épigraphique (The Year in Epigraphy, abbreviated AE), Presses Universitaires de France (1888–present).
- Ronald Syme, "Personal Names in Annals I–VI", in Journal of Roman Studies, vol. 39 (1949).
- Silvio Panciera, La collezione epigrafica dei musei Capitolini (The Epigraphic Collection of the Capitoline Museum), Quasar Edizioni, Rome (1987).
