= Statilia Messalina =

Roman empress from AD 66 to 68

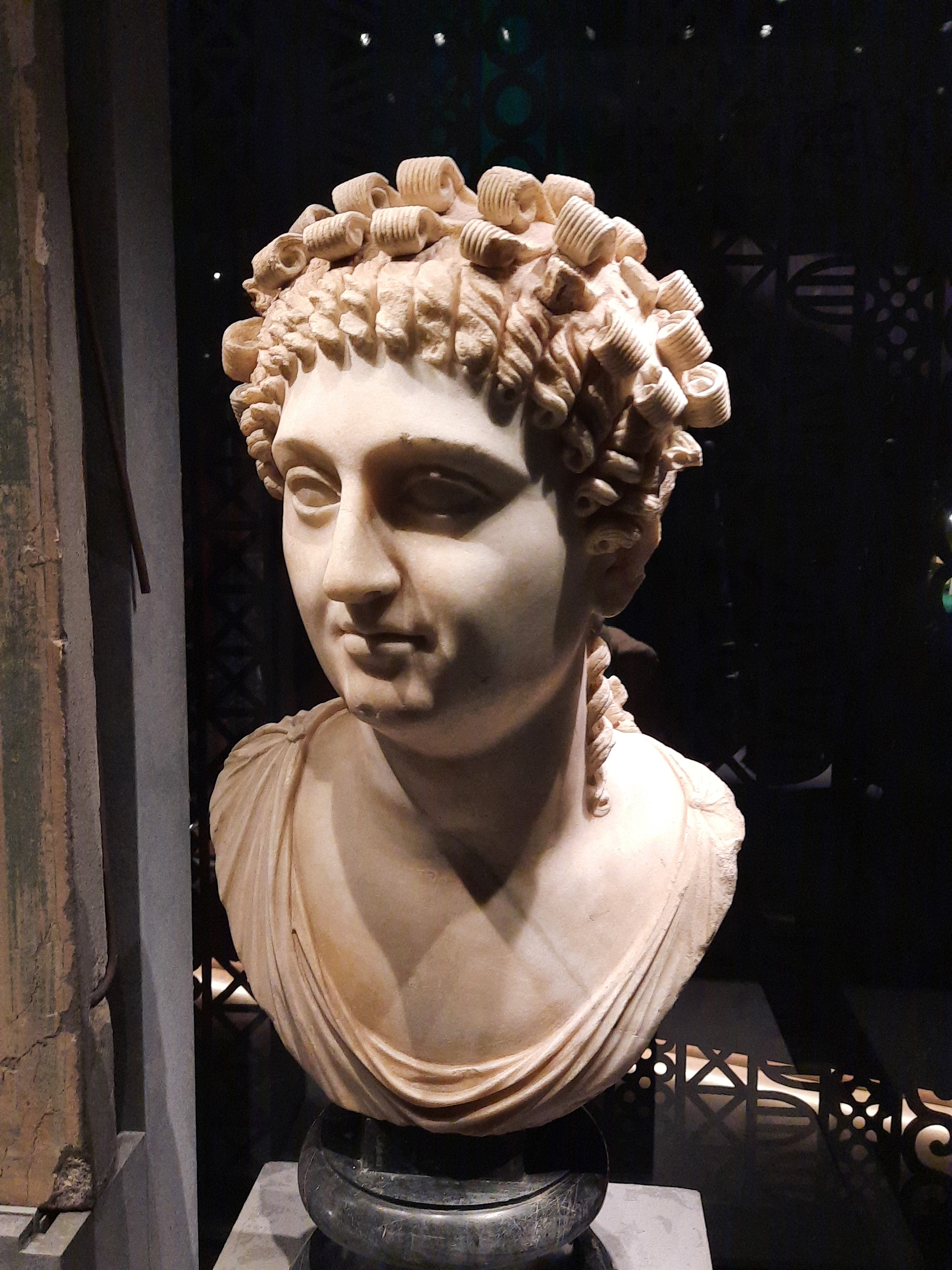
- Statilia Messalina, third wife of Nero

Roman empress
- Tenure: AD 66 – 9 June AD 68
- Born: c. AD 35
- Died: after AD 68
- Spouse: Marcus Julius Vestinus Atticus; Nero
- Issue: at least one son
- House: Julio-Claudian (by marriage)
- Father: possibly Titus Statilius Taurus Corvinus

Statilia Messalina (c. AD 35 – after 68) was a Roman patrician woman, a Roman Empress and third wife to Roman Emperor Nero.

== Biography ==
=== Background ===
The ancient sources say little of her family; however, Suetonius states that she was a great-great-granddaughter of Titus Statilius Taurus, a Roman general who was awarded a triumph for his victory and was twice consul. She was either the daughter of Titus Statilius Taurus Corvinus, consul in 45 AD, and who was involved in a plot against the Emperor Claudius, or a daughter of the sister of Corvinus, Statilia Messallina. Her grandmother might have been Valeria Messalina Corvina, one of the daughters of Roman senator Marcus Valerius Messalla Corvinus who served as consul in 31 BC.

=== Marriages ===
Her fourth husband was the consul Marcus Julius Vestinus Atticus to whom she may have borne a son (who died in 88 AD). Around 65 AD, she became Nero's mistress. After the death of the emperor's second wife Poppaea Sabina, Vestinus was forced to commit suicide in 66, so Nero could marry Statilia.

She was one of the few of Nero's courtiers who survived the fall of his reign. After Nero's death, Otho promised that he would marry her, before his suicide in 69 AD.

== See also ==
- Julio-Claudian family tree
