= Vistilia (prostitute) =

Ancient Roman prostitute

Vistilia was an ancient Roman woman who registered herself as a prostitute, possibly to avoid charges of adultery. She was nonetheless prosecuted for immorality in approximately the year 19 CE, during the reign of Tiberius.

== Biography ==
She was of the gens Vistilia and probably the daughter of Sextus Vistilius, making her a cousin of the future empress Milonia Caesonia, through Caesonia's mother Vistilia.

Tacitus describes Vistilia as a noble Roman woman who denounced herself as a prostitute to the aediles who regulated prostitution. Roman lawmakers wanted to keep prostitution legal while also punishing prostitutes by publicly shaming them; thus, sex workers were legally required to publicly register themselves in this way. Additionally, those registered as prostitutes lost many of their rights.

Current scholarly consensus, however, holds that Vistilia was not actually a sex worker. Instead, many scholars suggest that she registered herself as a prostitute in order to take advantage of a legal loophole in Roman law, to avoid prosecution for adultery. The lex Julia de adulteris (established by Augustus) exempted those registered as prostitutes from being prosecuted for adultery. Suetonius described this practice of registering as a prostitute despite not being one, in order to avoid prosecution, though he did not mention Vistilia specifically.

Vistilia was nonetheless tried by the Roman Senate. Her husband, Titidius Labeo, when asked why he had not tried to enforce the statutory penalty, stated the consultation period (which was sixty days) had not yet expired. The senate decided to prosecute only Vistilia (under Roman law, husbands who did not immediately punish adulterous wives could be tried as pimps). Vistilia was found guilty, and was deported to the Greek island of Seriphos. Subsequently, in 19 CE, the Roman Senate passed a law that no Roman woman whose father or grandfather was of equestrian status or higher could register as a prostitute.

== See also ==
- List of Roman women
- Women in ancient Rome
