= Coelia gens =

Ancient Roman family

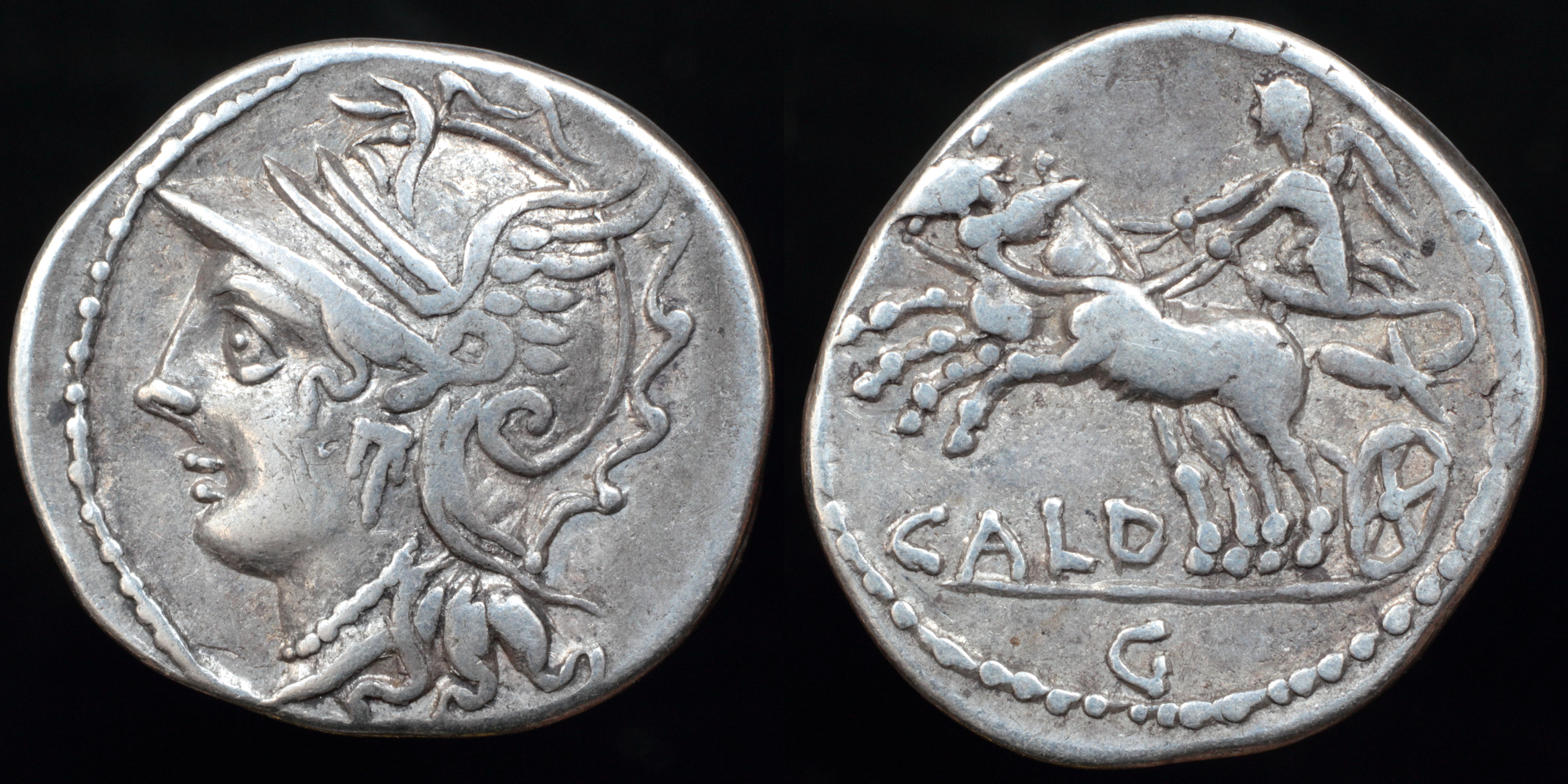
Denarius issued by Gaius Coelius Caldus in 104 BC. The obverse depicts a head of Roma, the reverse Victoria driving a biga.

The gens Coelia, occasionally written Coilia, was a plebeian family at ancient Rome. The Coelii are frequently confounded with the Caelii, with some individuals called Caelius in manuscripts, while they appear as Coelius or Coilius on coins. The first of this gens who obtained the consulship was Gaius Coelius Caldus in 94 BC.

== Praenomina ==
The Caelii mentioned in history used the praenomina Lucius, Gaius, and Marcus, all of which were amongst the most common names at Rome.

== Branches and cognomina ==
There only regular surname of this gens under the Republic was Caldus, derived from the Latin calidus, which translates "hot" or "rash". The same cognomen also gave rise to the gentilicium Calidius.

== Members ==
This list includes abbreviated praenomina. For an explanation of this practice, see filiation.

=== Early Coelii ===
- Lucius Coelius, commanded as a legate in Illyricum during the war against Perseus, in 169 BC, and was defeated in his attempt to take the town of Uscana.
- Lucius Coelius Antipater, a jurist and historian during the latter half of the second century BC.
- Gaius (Coelius) Antipater, a legate of Gaius Norbanus in 82 BC, was among the officers murdered at a banquet by their colleague, Albinovanus. He was probably related to the historian, since their cognomen is otherwise unknown during Republican times.
- Marcus Coelius M. f. Vinicianus, quaestor circa 56 BC, tribune of the plebs in 53, praetor about 48, and subsequently proconsul of Bithynia and Pontus. Although a supporter of Pompeius during his tribunate, he was a partisan of Caesar during the Civil War.

=== Coelii Caldi ===
- Gaius Coelius C. f., a senator in 129 BC, probably the father of Gaius Coelius Caldus, the consul of 94 BC.
- Gaius Coelius C. f. C. n. Caldus, consul in 94 BC, a novus homo and minor orator.
- Lucius Coelius C. f. C. n. Caldus, septemvir epulo.
- Gaius Coelius L. f. C. n. Caldus, quaestor under Cicero in Cilicia in 50 BC; when Cicero departed the province, he left the administration in the hands of Caldus.
- Coelius Caldus, taken prisoner by the Germans following the defeat of Publius Quinctilius Varus in AD 9, killed himself rather than be subjected to the torture he anticipated.

=== Later Coelii ===
- Lucius Coelius Festus, suffect consul in AD 148.
- Marcus Coelius Roscius, legate of the twentieth legion, stationed in Britain at the time of Nero's death in AD 68.
- Publius Coelius Balbinus, consul in AD 137.
- Coelia Concordia, a Virgo Vestalis Maxima, or head of the Vestals, erected in 385 a statue to Vettius Agorius Praetextatus, whose wife later honored her in equal fashion. She is the last Vestal attested epigraphically.
- Coelius Sedulius, a Christian poet of the early fifth century.

== See also ==
- List of Roman gentes

== Bibliography ==
- Marcus Tullius Cicero, De Inventione, Epistulae ad Atticum, Epistulae ad Familiares.
- Titus Livius (Livy), History of Rome.
- Marcus Velleius Paterculus, Compendium of Roman History.
- Publius Cornelius Tacitus, Historiae.
- Dictionary of Greek and Roman Biography and Mythology, William Smith, ed., Little, Brown and Company, Boston (1849).
- George Davis Chase, "The Origin of Roman Praenomina", in Harvard Studies in Classical Philology, vol. VIII, pp. 103–184 (1897).
- T. Robert S. Broughton, The Magistrates of the Roman Republic, American Philological Association (1952–1986).
- Attilio Degrassi, Inscriptiones Latinae Liberae Rei Publicae, (Free Latin Inscriptions of the Republic, abbreviated ILLRP), La Nuova Italia, Florence (1957–1963).
- D.P. Simpson, Cassell's Latin and English Dictionary, Macmillan Publishing Company, New York (1963).
- Robert K. Sherk, "The Text of the Senatus Consultum De Agro Pergameno", in Greek, Roman, and Byzantine Studies, vol. 7, pp. 361–369 (1966).
- Crawford, Michael Hewson (1974). Roman Republican Coinage. Cambridge University Press. ISBN 978-0-521-07492-6.
- August Pauly; Georg Wissowa; Wilhelm Kroll; Kurt Witte; Karl Mittelhaus; Konrat Ziegler, eds. (1894–1980). Paulys Realencyclopädie der classischen Altertumswissenschaft. Stuttgart: J. B. Metzler.
