= Titus Quinctius Crispinus Sulpicianus =

Roman senator and consul

Consul of the Roman Empire
- In office 9 – 9 BC Serving with Nero Claudius Drusus
- Preceded by: Africanus Fabius Maximus; Iullus Antonius
- Succeeded by: Gaius Marcius Censorinus; Gaius Asinius Gallus

Personal details
- Born: Unknown Roman Republic
- Died: Unknown Roman Empire

Titus Quinctius Crispinus Sulpicianus (fl. 1st century BC) was a Roman senator who was elected consul in 9 BC.

== Biography ==
Crispinus Sulpicianus was of Patrician descent, and he was either the biological son of a Sulpicius who was adopted by a Titus Quinctius (otherwise unknown), or the son of a Titus Quinctius and a Sulpicia.

Crispinus Sulpicianus’ career is largely unknown; by 18 BC he was a triumvir monetalis, and in 9 BC, he was elected consul, serving alongside Augustus' stepson Nero Claudius Drusus. During his consulship, he secured passage of the lex Quinctia, which provided penalties for damage to aqueducts. It was also during his consulship that the Ara Pacis was inaugurated in the Campus Martius.

Velleius Paterculus characterized Crispinus Sulpicianus as "useless and defiant", and accused him of “unique depravity disguised by forbidding eyebrows”. A supporter of Iullus Antonius, he was accused of being one of the lovers of Julia the Elder and was either banished from Rome or executed in 2 BC as a result.

It is speculated that Crispinus Sulpicianus had adopted a Valerius, who became Titus Quinctius Crispinus Valerianus, suffect consul in AD 2.

== Text of the lex Quinctia ==
The text of the law was preserved by Frontinus, imperial curator of the water supply in AD 97–98.

”The consul Titus Quinctius Crispinus duly proposed to the people, and the people duly resolved in the Forum before the Rostra of the Temple of the deified Julius on June 30. The tribe Sergia began the voting on the following proposal, and Sextus Virro, son of Lucius Virro, cast the first vote on its behalf.

“Whoever, after the passage of this law, with malice aforethought pierces or breaks or causes to be pierced or broken, or in any way damages mains, conduits, arches, pipes of any size, reservoirs, or cisterns of the public water supply, which is conducted into the city, whereby these waters or any part of them cannot go, fall, flow, reach, or be conducted to the city of Rome; or whereby the water, which is or shall be granted or assigned to the owner or possessor of gardens, properties, or estates in the city of Rome and the structures now or hereafter neighboring it, diminishes in its flow or distribution to such gardens, properties, or estates, or its apportionment to reservoirs, or its storage in cisterns: that person shall be condemned to pay a fine of 100,000 sesterces to the Roman people; and, more over, whoever does any of these things with malicious deception shall be condemned also to repair, to remake, to restore, to build or to set up what he has destroyed and to demolish what he has built and to do all this in a proper manner.

“Whoever is curator of the water supply, or, if there is no curator, then the peregrine praetor, shall compel and coerce by fine or by seizure of pledges the proper execution of all these acts. The said curator shall have the right and the power of compulsion, coercion, assessment of fines, and seizure of pledge on this account; if there is no curator, then the aforesaid praetor shall have this right and power.

“If a slave does any of these things his master shall be condemned to pay a fine of 100,000 sesterces to the Roman people.

“If any area is delimited on each side of mains, conduits, arches, pipes of any size, reservoirs, or cisterns of the public water supply, which is or in the future shall be furnished to the city of Rome: after the passage of this law no one shall obstruct, construct, fence, fix, establish, set up, locate, plow, or sow anything therein; nor shall anyone introduce anything into that area, except what is permitted or ordered by this law for construction or repairs. Whoever does anything contrary to these regulations shall be subjected in every particular to the same law, statute, and procedure as he would be and properly should be, if he pierced or broke a main or a conduit contrary to this law.

“It is not the intent of this law to revoke the right of pasturage in this area, of cutting grass and hay, or of gathering briers therefrom.

“The present and the future curators of the water supply shall provide in a proper manner that trees, vines, brush, briers, banks, fences, willows, or reeds shall be removed, cut off, dug out, and uprooted in such area as is delimited on each side of springs, arches, walls, mains, and conduits, and on this account they shall have the right to seize pledges, to impose fines, and to exact punishment, and they shall have the right and the power to do these things without prejudice to themselves.

“It is not the intent of this law to revoke the right of the curators to allow owners to keep vines or trees that are enclosed within farmhouses, buildings, or fences, or to keep fences, if the curators decide that they need not be destroyed, and as long as the names of the curators so ruling are inscribed or engraved thereon.

“It is not the intent of this law to revoke the right of persons to take or to draw water from these springs, mains, conduits, or arches to whom the curators of the water supply have given or shall give such right, except that it is permitted with wheel, water regulator, or other mechanical contrivance, and provided that they dig no well and bore no new aperture into it.”

== Sources ==
- Syme, Ronald, "The Augustan Aristocracy" (1986) Clarendon Press

Political offices
Preceded by Africanus Fabius Maximus, and Iullus Antonius	Consul of the Roman Empire; 9 BC with Nero Claudius Drusus	Succeeded by Gaius Marcius Censorinus, and Gaius Asinius Gallus
