= Gaius Vibius Marsus =

1st century Roman senator, consul and provincial governor

Gaius Vibius Marsus, whom Tacitus calls "vetustis honoribus studiisque illustris", was a Roman senator active during the Principate. He was consul in 17 AD.

== Biography ==
Marsus was Suffect consul for the second half of the year 17 with Lucius Voluseius Proculus as his colleague. He was mentioned in the year 19 as one of the most likely persons to obtain the government of Syria, but the post wound up going to Gnaeus Sentius Saturninus instead. In the same year he was sent to summon Gnaeus Calpurnius Piso to Rome to stand his trial. His name occurs again in 26, in the debates of the Roman Senate; and just before the death of Tiberius in 37 he narrowly escaped his own death, being accused as one of the accomplices of the notorious Albucilla. According to Tacitus he was governor of Syria 42-44/45, during the reign of Claudius.

The name of "Gaius Vibius Marsus", proconsul, appears on several coins of Utica in Africa, struck in the reign of Tiberius: they probably relate to this Vibius Marsus; and as he was disappointed in obtaining the province of Syria in the reign of Tiberius, he may have been appointed to that of Africa.

== Family ==
Marsus was married to a woman named Laelia, they had a daughter named Vibia together who married Publius Plautius Pulcher.

== See also ==
- List of Roman consuls

Political offices
Preceded by Lucius Pomponius Flaccus, and Gaius Caelius Rufus as Ordinary consuls	Suffect consul of the Roman Empire; 17 with Lucius Voluseius Proculus	Succeeded by Tiberius Caesar Augustus III, and Germanicus Julius Caesar II as Ordinary consuls
