= Titus Statilius Taurus Corvinus =

Roman consul in 45 CE

Titus Statilius Taurus Corvinus was a member of the Titus Statilius Taurus family of Roman Senators which went back to Titus Statilius Taurus, the general of emperor Augustus. Corvinus was consul in 45 AD during the reign of the Emperor Claudius with Marcus Vinicius as his colleague.

His maternal grandfather was Marcus Valerius Messalla Corvinus, his mother being Corvinus' daughter Valeria Messalina and his father was Titus Statilius Taurus, consul in AD 11. His brother was Titus Statilius Taurus, consul in 44.

In the year 46, with Asinius Gallus the Younger, the grandson of Asinius Pollio, he conspired in a plot against the Emperor Claudius hatched with several of Claudius' own freedmen. Certainly Gallus was exiled, but rather than exiled Corvinus may have been put to death. He may have been the father of Statilia Messalina, the third wife of the Emperor Nero.

Political offices
Preceded by Publius Calvisius Sabinus Pomponius Secundus, and Titus Statilius Taurus	Consul of the Roman Empire; 45 with Marcus Vinicius, followed by Tiberius Plautius Silvanus Aelianus	Succeeded by Aulus Antonius Rufus, and Marcus Pompeius Silvanus Staberius Flavianus as consules suffecti
