= Quintus Pomponius Secundus =

First century Roman politician

Quintus Pomponius Secundus was a Roman aristocrat of the first century, and consul suffectus in AD 41 as the colleague of Gnaeus Sentius Saturninus. His brother was the poet and statesman Publius Pomponius Secundus, and their half-sister, Milonia Caesonia, was the second wife of the emperor Caligula.

== Life ==
Pomponius' father is not known with certainty; the scholar Ronald Syme suggested that he might have been either Gaius Pomponius Graecinus, consul suffectus in AD 16, or his brother, Lucius Pomponius Flaccus, consul ordinarius in the following year. Pomponius' mother, Vistilia, was known for having borne seven children to six different men; of these only Quintus and Publius Pomponius shared the same father.

During the reign of Tiberius, the Pomponii were caught up in the political intrigues surrounding the downfall of Sejanus, a close advisor of the emperor, who was suspected of plotting to make himself the master of Rome in the emperor's absence. His downfall occurred during his consulship, in October of AD 31, when he had effective control of the government. One of his associates, a man named Aelius Gallus, fled to the house of Publius Pomponius, in the hope that his friend could protect him. On the basis of this friendship, Pomponius was one of those accused by Considius Proculus, a former praetor, of plotting revolution. Publius was placed under house arrest, and his brother, Quintus, gave surety on his behalf.

In AD 33, Considius was indicted for treason, taken from his home in the middle of his birthday celebrations, and executed. Quintus Pomponius brought an accusation against Considius' sister, Sancia, who was herself interdicted from fire and water. Pomponius asserted that his accusation was motivated by a desire to obtain the emperor's favor and ensure the safety of his brother, Publius, who nonetheless remained confined until the death of Tiberius four years later.

In 41, Caligula, who had entered the consulship with Gnaeus Sentius Saturninus, resigned after the first week in January, appointing Pomponius consul suffectus. A scant two weeks later, the emperor was assassinated, along with his wife, Milonia Caesonia, Pomponius' half-sister, and various members of the imperial household. Pomponius, whom Cassius Dio describes as a sycophant of the emperor, managed to evade death at the hands of the Praetorian Guard. He remained in office with Saturninus, probably until the Kalends of July; the two are still attested in office as of June 25, but two other pairs of consuls are known from the latter months of the year.

The following year Marcus Furius Camillus, the consul of AD 32, and then governor of Dalmatia, took up arms against Claudius. Quintus Pomponius, the target of relentless prosecution by Publius Suillius Rufus, joined their revolt, which was crushed after only five days. Camillus was permitted to live in exile for some years; Pomponius' fate is unknown, although he suffered damnatio memoriae; meanwhile his brother Publius remained in the emperor's favor.

== See also ==
- Pomponia gens

== Bibliography ==
- Gaius Plinius Secundus (Pliny the Elder), Historia Naturalis (Natural History).
- Flavius Josephus, Bellum Judaïcum (The Jewish War).
- Publius Cornelius Tacitus, Annales.
- Gaius Suetonius Tranquillus, De Vita Caesarum (Lives of the Caesars, or The Twelve Caesars).
- Ronald Syme, "Domitius Corbulo", in Journal of Roman Studies, vol. 60 (1970).
- Paul A. Gallivan, "The Fasti for the Reign of Claudius", in Classical Quarterly, vol. 28, pp. 407–426 (1978).

Political offices
Preceded by Caligula IV, and Gnaeus Sentius Saturninus as Ordinary consuls	Suffect consul of the Roman Empire; 41 with Gnaeus Sentius Saturninus	Succeeded by Quintus Futius Lusius Saturninus, and Marcus Seius Varanus as Suffect consuls
