= Vistilia =

Roman matron of the gens Vistilia

- Known for: progenitor of several notable Romans
- Children: Glitius; Publius Pomponius Secundus; Quintus Pomponius Secundus; Orfitus; Publius Suillius Rufus; Gnaeus Domitius Corbulo; Milonia Caesonia
- Relatives: Sextus Vistilius (brother); Domitia Longina (granddaughter)

Vistilia was a Roman matron of the gens Vistilia known by her contemporaries for having seven children by six different husbands; Pliny the Elder was more impressed by the fact most of her pregnancies were remarkably brief. Five of her sons became consuls, her daughter Milonia Caesonia became Roman empress through her marriage to Caligula, and her granddaughter Domitia Longina became empress through her marriage with Domitian. Due to her fertility Vistilia became a byword for prodigious fecundity in antiquity.

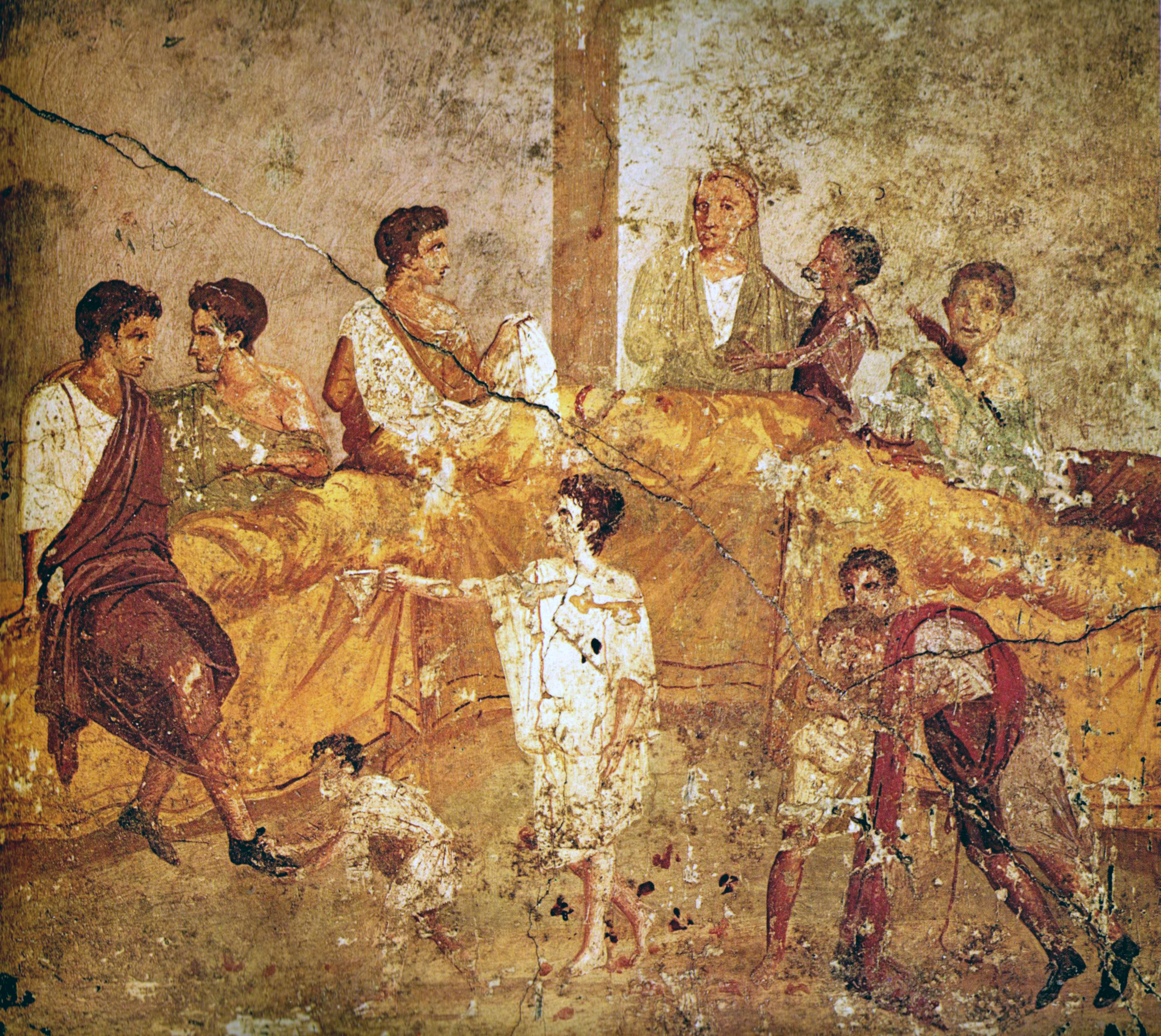
A multigenerational banquet depicted on a wall painting 1st century AD

== Biography ==
Her brother was probably Sextus Vistilius, a former praetor, who was a close friend to the Roman General Nero Claudius Drusus, the younger brother to Roman Emperor Tiberius. In the opinion of Frederik Juliaan Vervaet, this made Vistilia "an extremely valuable bride, whose connections offered her husbands and their joint children fantastic prospects. Four marriages, three clarissimi mariti before 10 BC." But when Drusus died of a fall from his horse in 9 BC, "marriage to Vistilia, from a praetorian family, suddenly became a lot less interesting for ambitious and high-ranking senators descending from noble families."

But then Sextus was admitted to the cohors amicorum, and her value as a bride was restored; she married twice more. When Tiberius charged Sextus for criticizing the morals of his great-nephew, Caligula, he excluded Sextus from his company. By the time Sextus committed suicide in 32, Vervaet notes "he had long outlived his utility."

== Issue ==
Vistilia was married six times and had seven children. Syme identifies the children as follows, with his dates of birth:

- Glitius, born c. 15 BC, the father of Publius Glitius Gallus, ordinary consul during the reign of Vespasian;
- Publius Pomponius Secundus, born c. 14 BC, tragedian and suffect consul in 44;
- Quintus Pomponius Secundus, born c. 12 BC, suffect consul in 41;
- Orfitus, born c. 11 BC, father of Servius Cornelius Scipio Salvidienus Orfitus, ordinary consul in 51; and
- Publius Suillius Rufus, born between 10 BC and 7 BC, suffect consul in 41, and father of Marcus Suillius Nerullinus, ordinary consul in 50;
- Gnaeus Domitius Corbulo, born between 4 BC and AD 1, Roman general and suffect consul in 39, who was the father to Roman Empress Domitia Longina; and
- Milonia Caesonia, born AD 5, the most famous, who became a Roman Empress and fourth wife to Roman Emperor Caligula.

== See also ==
- Vistilia (prostitute)
- Plautia (mother of Aelius Caesar)
- List of Roman women
- Women in ancient Rome
