= Einsiedeln Itinerary =

The Einsiedeln Itinerary (or Itinerary of Einsiedeln) is a ninth-century guide to the city of Rome written for Christian pilgrims. It was preserved in Einsiedeln Abbey in Switzerland.

The Itinerary was written by an anonymous author, probably a monk, based at the monastery of Pfäfers or of Reichenau. The manuscript subsequently made its way to Einsiedeln Abbey, where it was discovered and published in the seventeenth century.

It is not known precisely when the document was created. It refers to the monastery of Santo Stefano, and so was written after its completion in the mid-eighth century. It makes no reference to the Leonine City which was completed about 850, so scholars believe that it was written prior to this.

The Itinerary is written in eleven sections. Each section describes a crossing of Rome from one gate to another, describing the interesting sights to be seen on or near the particular route. The text describes many buildings and monuments, and describes in detail the walls of the city.

Historians study the Itinerary to discover information about the activities and motivations of ninth-century pilgrims as well as to add detail to historical knowledge of Roman buildings and institutions. An appendix to the Itinerary includes transcribed inscriptions from monuments in the city, many of which no longer exist.
