= Titus Statilius Taurus =

Name of a line of Roman senators and soldiers during the late Republic and early Empire

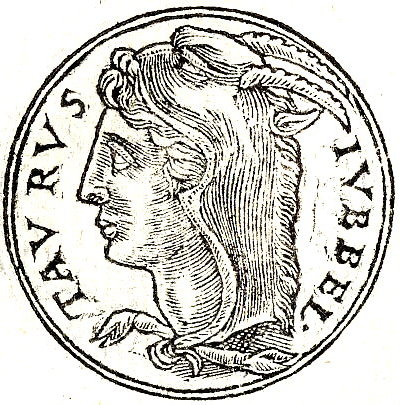
A depiction of Titus Statilius Taurus (I) from the Promptuarii Iconum Insigniorum.

Titus Statilius Taurus was the name of a line of Roman senators. The first known and most important of these was a Roman general and two-time consul prominent during the Triumviral and Augustan periods. The other men who bore this name were his descendants.

== Titus Statilius Taurus (I) ==
Titus Statilius Taurus (I) was a general and twice consul during the Triumviral and Augustan periods. This Taurus was a novus homo ("new man" or "self-made man") from the region of Lucania.

Initially a partisan of Marcus Antonius, by whom he was chosen as suffect consul in 37 BC, he subsequently was sent by Antonius with a fleet to aid Octavian in his war against Sextus Pompeius. After Pompey was driven from Sicily, Taurus crossed the sea to the province of Africa, which he secured without any difficulty and for which he was awarded a triumph in 34 BC. He returned to Rome, where he began work on the city's first permanent amphitheatre.

In 34 BC, he accompanied Octavian on campaign to Dalmatia, and after Octavian's return to Rome, Taurus remained in command of the troops stationed there. When war with Marcus Antonius and Cleopatra broke out, Taurus chose Octavian's side and in the Battle of Actium, he was in command of Octavian's land force. Antony's land forces surrendered to him rather than fight him. This greatly accelerated the victory of Caesar Octavian. After the death of Antonius, Taurus was sent in 29 BC to Spain where he defeated the Cantabrians, Vaccaei and Astures. He was later made consul ordinarius for the year 26 BC alongside Augustus, as Octavian was now known. In 16 BC, when Augustus left Italy for Gaul, he left Taurus in Rome as praefectus urbi. Until the second consulship of Tiberius in 7 BC, Statilius Taurus was the last man to hold multiple consulships. It appears Augustus was experimenting with a "share the honors" program before he consolidated enough power to rule as the unofficial emperor.

Statilius Taurus' amphitheatre was completed in 29 BC, opening with a number of gladiatorial contests. These were received with so much acclaim that the people's assembly accorded Taurus the right to name a praetor every year.

Taurus is said to have maintained a private bodyguard of German slaves in Rome.

Taurus seems to have had three sons and possibly two daughters, though it is uncertain whether all these children were by the same woman. The eldest son, also named Titus Statilius Taurus (II), was a monetalis, but did not reach consular years. A second son, also named Titus Statilius Taurus (III), was consul in 11 AD. A third son was named Sisenna Statilius Taurus consul in 16 AD. It seems certain that Taurus had at least one daughter, Statilia L. Pisonis, who married Lucius Calpurnius Piso the Augur (consul in 1 BC). A second may be the Statilia who died at the age of 99 in the reign of Claudius, although she may have been a sister to this Taurus.

Political offices
Preceded by L. Caninius Gallus as consul ordinarius	Suffect Consul of the Roman Republic; 37 BC with Marcus Agrippa	Succeeded by L. Gellius Publicola, and M. Cocceius Nerva
Preceded by Augustus VII, and Marcus Agrippa III	Consul of the Roman Empire; 26 BC with Augustus VIII	Succeeded by Augustus IX, and M. Junius Silanus

== Titus Statilius Taurus (II) ==
Titus Statilius Taurus (II) was the eldest son of Titus Statilius Taurus (I), possibly by Cornelia Sisenna or an unknown woman. He was either the full-brother or half-brother of Titus Statilius Taurus (III), Sisenna Statilius Taurus, Statilia L. Pisonis and possibly Statilia.

All that is known of this Taurus is that he was a monetalis and died before reaching consular age.

== Titus Statilius Taurus (III) ==
Titus Statilius Taurus (III) was consul in 11 AD. He was the second son of Titus Statilius Taurus (I) perhaps by Cornelia Sisenna. He may have been the full-brother or half-brother of Titus Statilius Taurus (II) and possibly Statilia, and was probably the full-brother Sisenna Statilius Taurus and Statilia L. Pisonis.

This Taurus married Valeria, daughter of the senator Marcus Valerius Messalla Corvinus, and fathered three children by her: two consular sons, Titus Statilius Taurus (IV) and Titus Statilius Taurus Corvinus, and a daughter, Statilia Messallina, who was the mother to the Empress Statilia Messalina.

== Titus Statilius Taurus (IV) ==
Titus Statilius Taurus (IV) was the eldest son of Titus Statilius Taurus (III) by Valeria, daughter of Marcus Valerius Messalla Corvinus. He was brother to Titus Statilius Taurus Corvinus (consul 45 AD). This Taurus served as consul in 44 AD and later, proconsul of Africa from 51 to 53 AD.

A wealthy man, he laid out the celebrated Taurian Gardens. He was accused by Tarquitius Priscus, a former subordinate during his tenure as Proconsul of Africa, of "a few acts of extortion, but particularly ... [of] magical and superstitious practices" at the direction of Julia Agrippina, and despite his apparent innocence, he committed suicide as a result of these accusations.

== References and citations ==
- Appian, Bell. Civ. v. 5, 27, 97–99, 103, 109, 118
- Dion Cassius xlix. 14, 38, li. 20, liii. 23, liv. 9
- Tacitus, Annales vi. 11, xii.59
- Goldsworthy, Adrian (2014). Augustus: First Emperor of Rome. Yale University Press. ISBN 9780300178722.
- Syme, Ronald (1989). Augustan Aristocracy. Oxford University Press. ISBN 9780198147312.
