= Gaius Marcius Censorinus (consul 8 BC) =

Consul of the Roman Empire
- In office 8 BC – 8 BC Serving with Gaius Asinius Gallus
- Preceded by: Nero Claudius Drusus; Titus Quinctius Crispinus Sulpicianus
- Succeeded by: Gnaeus Calpurnius Piso; Tiberius Claudius Nero

Personal details
- Born: Unknown Roman Republic
- Died: AD 2 Roman Empire
- Parents: Unknown (father); Unknown (mother)

Gaius Marcius Censorinus (died c. AD 2) was a Roman Senator who was elected consul in 8 BC.

== Biography ==
A member of the Plebeian Censorini branch of the gens Marcia, Marcius Censorinus was the son of Lucius Marcius Censorinus, the consul of 39 BC. He was appointed as Triumvir monetalis sometime around 20 or 19 BC. He was elected consul in 8 BC alongside Gaius Asinius Gallus Saloninus, but his election was clouded by accusations of electoral bribery; the emperor Augustus however refused to intervene. During his consulship, he offered votive games to Jupiter Optimus Maximus for the return of Augustus who was touring the provinces at the time. He also chaired the session of the Senate which voted to rename the month of Sextilis to August in honour of the emperor.

Prior to 11 BC Marcius Censorinus was admitted to the collegia of Augurs. Around 3 BC the sortition awarded him the proconsular governorship of Asia. It is conjectured that he was later the consular Legatus Augusti pro praetore (or imperial governor) of Galatia in around AD 2, where he hosted Gaius Caesar during his stay in the east. He died in that year, while still governor of Galatia.

Marcius Censorinus was a patron of the city of Miletus, and in the city of Mylasa he was given the title of "saviour and founder", and games called the Censorineia were held annually in his honour. The poet Horace wrote an ode in his honour, and he was praised by the Roman historian Marcus Velleius Paterculus as "vir demerendis hominibus genitus". He had no known children.

== Sources ==
- Swan, Peter Michael (17 June 2004). The Augustan Succession: An Historical Commentary on Cassius Dio's Roman History Books 55-56 (9 B.C.-A.D. 14). Oxford University Press. doi:10.1093/oso/9780195167740.001.0001. ISBN 978-0-19-516774-0.
- Syme, Ronald (1986). The Augustan Aristocracy. Clarendon Press. ISBN 978-0-19-814859-3.
- CIL VI, 36789

Political offices
Preceded by Nero Claudius Drusus, and Titus Quinctius Crispinus Sulpicianus	Consul of the Roman Empire; 8 BC with Gaius Asinius Gallus Saloninus	Succeeded by Tiberius Claudius Nero II, and Gnaeus Calpurnius Piso
