= Sisenna Statilius Taurus =

1st century AD Roman senator and consul

Sisenna Statilius Taurus was a Roman senator. He was consul for the year AD 16 with Lucius Scribonius Libo as his colleague. Most of our information about Sisenna comes from inscriptions.

Sisenna was the grandson of Titus Statilius Taurus, consul in 37 BC and 26 BC. His father is attested as a tresviri monetalis, but died before he could accede to the consulate; his mother has not been identified. Sisenna was also the younger brother of Titus Statilius Taurus. The name of his wife has also failed to come down to us, but he is known to have children, who include Cornelia Tauri f. the wife of the consul Titus Axius.

The tombstone of one of his freedmen, found in Istria, belonging to modern Croatia, provides us a few clues about his life. One is that it supplies Sisenna with the title of pontiff, not only indicating he was a member of the prestigious college of pontiffs; another is that it indicates he or his family owned estates in Regio X Venetia et Histria of Italia. Tombstones for other freedmen suggest he owned estates near Aquileia. The historian Velleius Paterculus not only mentions him alive in AD 30, but as owning the mansion once owned by Cicero in Rome.

Political offices
Preceded by Drusus Julius Caesar, and Gaius Norbanus Flaccus	Consul of the Roman Empire; 16 with Lucius Scribonius Libo	Succeeded by Gaius Vibius Rufus, and Publius Pomponius Graecinus as suffect consuls
