= Calidia gens =

Ancient Roman family

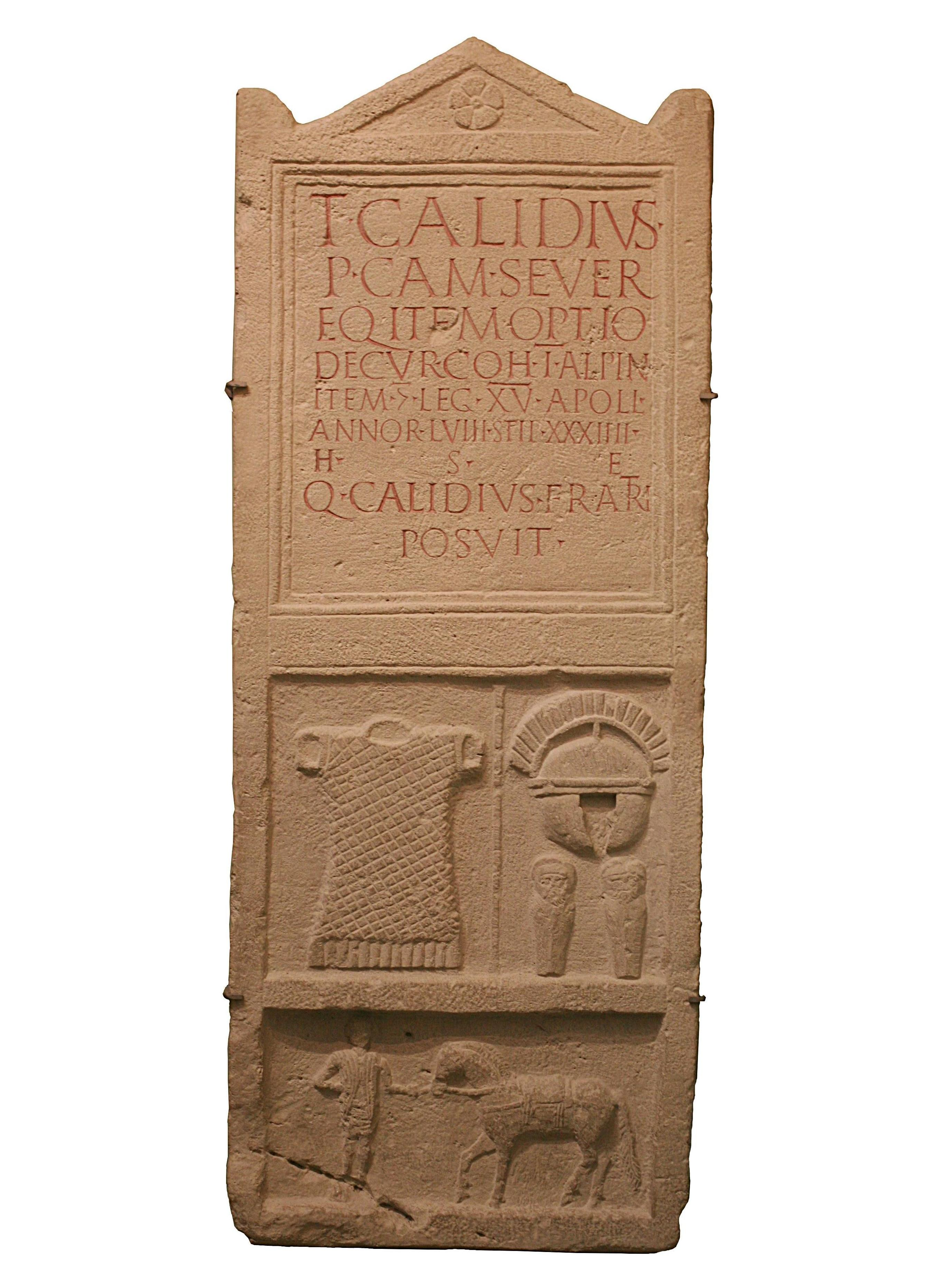
Monument of Titus Calidius Severus.

The gens Calidia or Callidia was a Roman family during the final century of the Republic. The first of the gens to achieve prominence was Quintus Calidius, tribune of the plebs in 99 and praetor in 79 B.C.

== Origin of the gens ==
The nomen Calidius is probably derived from the Latin adjective calidus, which may be translated as "warm, hot, fiery," or "passionate".

== Praenomina used by the gens ==
The earlier Calidii are known to have used the praenomina Quintus, Gnaeus, and Marcus. Under the Empire the names Publius and Titus are also found.

== Branches and cognomina of the gens ==
The Calidii of the Republic are not known to have been divided into families. In imperial times, a family of this gens bore the surname Severus.

== Members of the gens ==
This list includes abbreviated praenomina. For an explanation of this practice, see filiation.

- Marcus Calidius, triumvir monetalis in 117 or 116 BC. He was probably the father of Quintus Calidius, the praetor of 79 BC.
- Gnaeus Calidius, an influential eques in Sicily, who was robbed of his silver by Verres. Calidius' son was a judge and Roman senator.
- Quintus Calidius M. f., tribune of the plebs in 99 and praetor in 79 BC.
- Marcus Calidius Q. f. M. n., praetor in 57 BC, a celebrated orator and contemporary of Cicero.
- Publius Calidius Severus, father of Titus Calidius, the soldier.
- Titus Calidius P. f. Severus, an optio of the fifteenth legion, perhaps during the latter half of the first century AD.
- Quintus Calidius P. f. Severus, brother of Titus Calidius, the soldier, in whose memory he erected a monument at Carnuntum.

== See also ==
- List of Roman gentes

== Bibliography ==
- Michael Crawford, Roman Republican Coinage, Cambridge University Press (1974, 2001).
