= Gaius Asinius Gallus =

Roman politician and writer

Consul of the Roman Empire
- In office 8 BC – 8 BC Serving with Gaius Marcius Censorinus
- Preceded by: Nero Claudius Drusus; Titus Quinctius Crispinus Sulpicianus
- Succeeded by: Gnaeus Calpurnius Piso; Tiberius Claudius Nero

Personal details
- Born: Before 38 BC Roman Republic
- Died: AD 33 Roman Empire
- Spouse: Vipsania Agrippina
- Children: Gaius Asinius Pollio; Marcus Asinius Agrippa; Asinius Saloninus; Servius Asinius Celer; Lucius Asinius Gallus
- Parents: Gaius Asinius Pollio (father); Quinctia (mother)

Gaius Asinius Gallus (before 38 BC – AD 33) was a Roman senator, son of Gaius Asinius Pollio and Quinctia. He was the second husband of Vipsania and was ultimately imprisoned by her first husband, Tiberius.

== Biography ==
In 11 BC he married Vipsania Agrippina, daughter of Marcus Vipsanius Agrippa and his first wife Caecilia Attica, and the former wife of Tiberius. Their union proved fruitful and produced at least six children. Gallus also claimed true paternity of Drusus Julius Caesar, earning him Tiberius' animosity. If Gallus' claim was true, he might also have been the father of the child Vipsania was expecting on her divorce.

He is mentioned among the speakers at the senate meeting discussing Augustus' funeral in AD 14; on the subject of last honours he proposed that the funeral train should pass under a triumphal gateway. When the senate met to discuss the transfer of power, Gallus made a joke at Tiberius' expense; when Tiberius made a formulaic protest against the total power the Senate had proposed to award him and said that he would instead take charge of whichever department was assigned to him (a demurral, the sources imply, that he expected the Senate to reject), Gallus responded by asking him to choose whichever he wished. This embarrassed Tiberius publicly, and although Gallus attempted to quell the emperor's anger, he was unsuccessful.

In 30, he was arrested on Tiberius' orders. At Tiberius' instigation, the Senate declared Gallus a public enemy, and he was held in conditions of solitary confinement: "He had no companion or servant with him, spoke to no one, and saw no one, except when he was compelled to take food. And the food was of such quality and amount as neither to afford him any satisfaction or strength nor yet to allow him to die."

He died in prison of starvation in the year 33. When Agrippina died in October of that same year, Tiberius accused her of "having had Asinius Gallus as a paramour and being driven by his death to loathe existence". His name was erased from public monuments (a practice known as damnatio memoriae), although this was reversed after Tiberius' death.

== Marriage and children ==
Asinius Gallus' marriage to Vipsania (11 BC) led to the following known children:

- Gaius Asinius Pollio
  - He was consul in 23; exiled as an accuser of a conspiracy and later put to death on orders from Empress Valeria Messalina.
- Marcus Asinius Agrippa
  - He was consul in 25 and died in 26.
- Gnaeus Asinius Saloninus, or simply Asinius Saloninus
  - Tacitus describes him as an ‘eminent’ person. Saloninus was intended to marry one of the granddaughters of Emperor Tiberius. He died in 22.
- Servius Asinius Celer
  - He was consul suffectus in 38. From Emperor Caligula he purchased a fish at an enormous price. He is mentioned in Seneca's satire The Pumpkinification of Claudius, where he is listed among the many people killed by that emperor. His death probably occurred sometime before mid-47. Asinius Celer seems to have had a daughter by the name of Asinia Agrippina, though her existence is obscure.
- Lucius Asinius Gallus (sometimes wrongly called Gallo)
  - In 46 he conspired with Titus Statilius Taurus Corvinus against Claudius and was forced to go into exile. Cassius Dio describes him as being "very small and ugly". Later rehabilitated, he became Consul in 62.
- Gnaeus Asinius
  - His existence is recorded by the townsfolk of Puteoli, whose patron he was. He may have been identical with Asinius Saloninus or the foregoing Asinius Gallus. Since the Asinius Gallus seems to have been the Lucius Asinius Gallus who became a Consul in 60, by exclusion of parts the Gnaeus Asinius must be the Asinius Saloninus.

== In fiction ==
In the BBC television series I, Claudius, Gallus is portrayed by Charles Kay.

In Lloyd C Douglas's novel The Robe, Gallus is furnished with a fictional daughter, Diana, the love interest of the story.

== Sources ==
- Syme, Ronald, and Barbara M. Levick. "Asinius Gallus, Gaius". In Hornblower, Simon, and Antony Spawforth, eds., The Oxford Classical Dictionary. Oxford: Oxford University Press, 2003. 191–192.

Political offices
Preceded by Nero Claudius Drusus; Titus Quinctius Crispinus Sulpicianus	Roman consul 8 BC with Gaius Marcius Censorinus	Succeeded by Tiberius Claudius Nero II; Gnaeus Calpurnius Piso
