= Nero Claudius Drusus =

Roman general and politician (38–9 BC)

- Consul
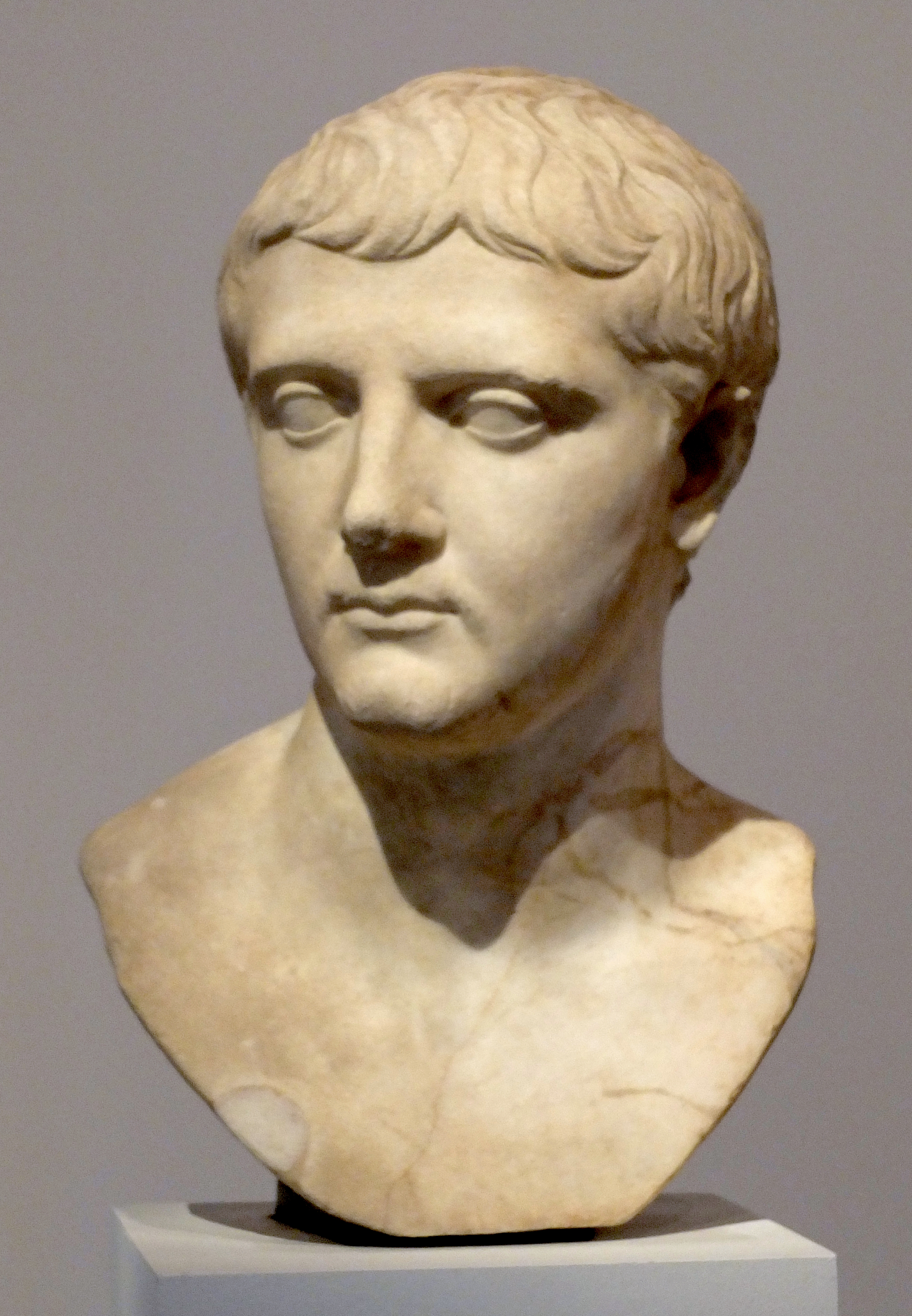
- Bust of Nero Claudius Drusus, in the Capitoline Museums, Rome
- Born: Decimus Claudius Drusus or Decimus Claudius Nero; 38 BC; Rome, Italy, Roman Republic
- Died: 9 BC (aged 29); Magna Germania
- Burial: Mausoleum of Augustus
- Spouse: Antonia the Younger
- Issue Detail: Germanicus; Livilla; Emperor Claudius
Posthumous name
- Nero Claudius Drusus Germanicus
- Dynasty: Julio-Claudian
- Father: Tiberius Claudius Nero
- Mother: Livia Drusilla
- Office: Quaestor (18 BC); Propraetor (Gaul, 15-11 BC); Urban Praetor (11 BC); Consul (9 BC)

Nero Claudius Drusus Germanicus (38–9 BC), commonly known in English as Drusus the Elder, was a Roman general and politician. He was a patrician Claudian, but his mother was from a plebeian family. He was the son of Livia Drusilla and the stepson of her second husband, the Emperor Augustus. He was also the brother of the Emperor Tiberius; the father of the Emperor Claudius and general Germanicus; paternal grandfather of the Emperor Caligula, and maternal great-grandfather of the Emperor Nero.

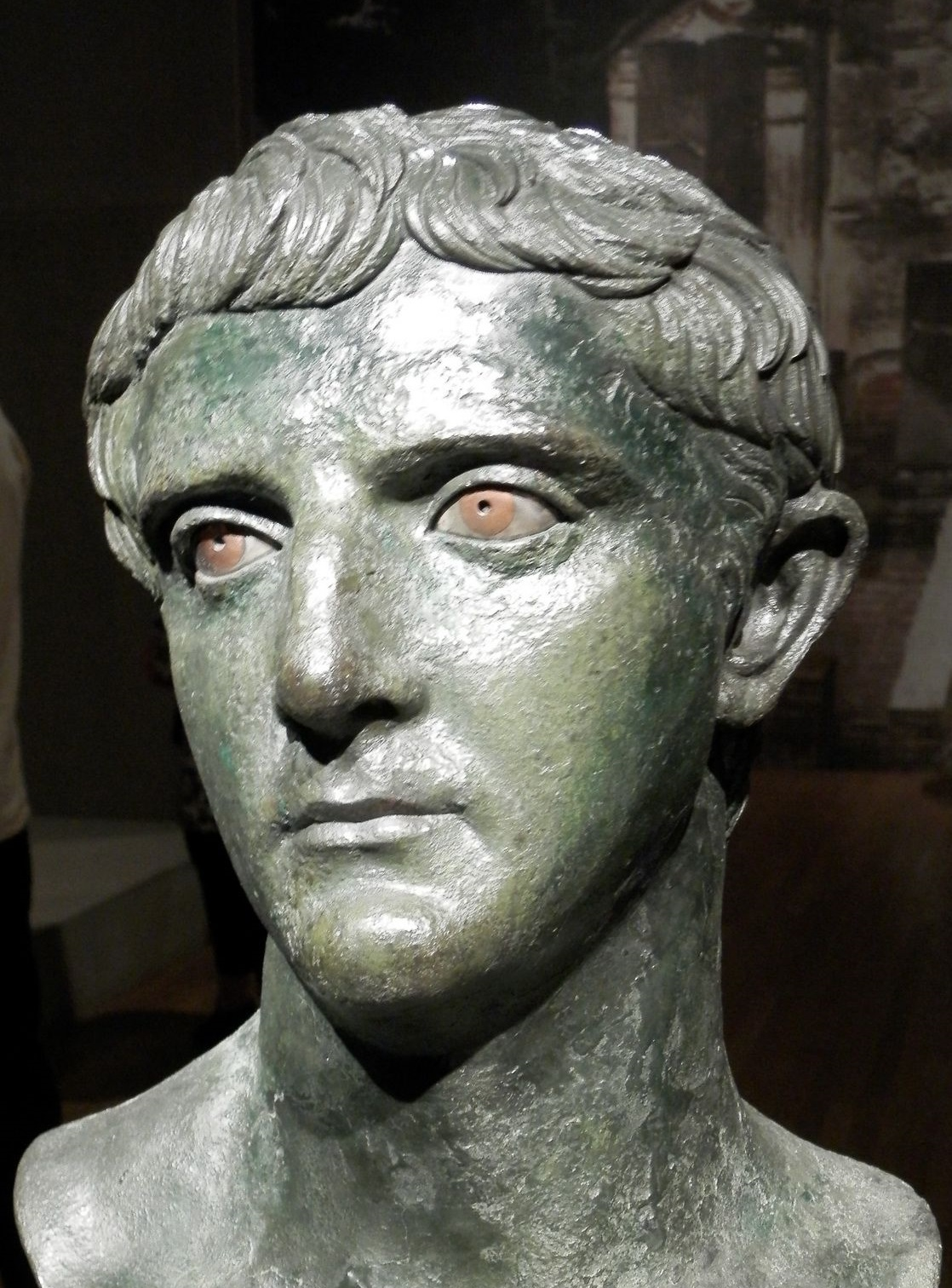
Bronze bust of Nero Claudius Drusus in the National Archaeological Museum, Naples

Drusus launched the first major Roman campaigns across the Rhine and began the conquest of Germania, becoming the first Roman general to reach the Weser and Elbe rivers. In 12 BC, he led a successful campaign into Germania, subjugating the Sicambri. Later that year, he led a naval expedition against Germanic tribes along the North Sea coast, conquering the Batavi and the Frisii, and defeating the Chauci near the mouth of the Weser. In 11 BC, he conquered the Usipetes and the Marsi, extending Roman control to the Upper Weser. In 10 BC, he launched a campaign against the Chatti and the resurgent Sicambri, subjugating both. The following year, while serving as consul, he conquered the Mattiaci and defeated the Marcomanni and the Cherusci, the latter near the Elbe. His Germanic campaigns were cut short in the summer of 9 BC by his death after a riding accident.

Drusus was a very able commander. His death slowed the northward expansion of the Roman Empire, and foreshadowed the disastrous Battle of the Teutoburg Forest. He was enormously popular among his men, who erected the Drususstein in his honor; his memory was elevated during the reign of his son Claudius. Drusus' accomplishments in battle were considerable. He fought numerous Germanic chiefs in single combat, and was likely the fourth and final Roman to achieve the spolia opima (for taking the armor and weapons of an enemy king after defeating him in single combat), though he died before he could be honored for it.

== Early life ==
=== Childhood ===
Drusus was the youngest son of Livia Drusilla from her marriage to Tiberius Claudius Nero, who was legally declared his father before the couple divorced. Drusus was born between mid-March and mid-April 38 BC, three months after Livia married Augustus on 17 January. Gerhard Radke has proposed the date of 28 March as his most likely birthday, while Lindsay Powell interprets Ovid's Fasti as indicating a date of 13 January. Rumors arose that Augustus was the child's real father, although impossible as Livia was already pregnant when she met her future husband (Emperor Claudius nonetheless encouraged the rumor during his reign to create an impression of more direct lineage from Augustus).

Drusus was raised in Claudius Nero's house with his brother, the future emperor Tiberius, until his legal father's death. The two brothers developed a famously close relationship that would last the rest of their lives. Tiberius named his eldest son after his brother, although eldest sons were usually named after their father or grandfather. Drusus named his second son (future emperor Claudius) after Tiberius.

=== Name ===
According to Suetonius, Drusus was originally given the name Decimus as his praenomen, but his full name was later changed to Nero Claudius Drusus. It is not known when or why the change occurred. The names were unusual at the time, both putting heavy emphasis on his maternal ancestry by using Livia's father's cognomen instead of that of her husband; in his original name the use of the praenomen Decimus was also atypical for prevalent families of the late Republic (especially for a patrician). (Note: In the past historians such as Theodor Mommsen assumed that Decimus had been a well used praenomen for the Claudii Nerones, but this has later come to be rejected by modern historians. Besides Tiberius the only praenomina known to have been used by this stirps is Gaius, Appius and Publius, each only attested twice. These praenomina (except Tiberius) were also common among the other patricians of the gens, while Decimus was neither used by the patrician or plebeian Claudii. The entirely plebeian Livii, including the equestrian nobiles the Livii Drusi, did not use Decimus either.) The eventual use of his father's cognomen Nero as a praenomen was highly unconventional as well. His full name given at his Dies lustricus is generally assumed to have been Decimus Claudius Drusus, but some historians such as Andrew Pettinger, Pierre Grimal, T. P. Wiseman, Greg Rowe, Barbara Levick and Eric D. Huntsman believe it may have been Decimus Claudius Nero, Decimus Claudius Nero Drusus or Decimus Claudius Drusus Nero instead.

Livia may have passed down her father's cognomen to her son simply because, besides her adoptive brother Marcus Livius Drusus Libo, there was no one else to pass it down for the future. In 1988 C.J. Simpson asserted that there are three moments in history where the name change is probable to have happened; when his brother Tiberius was adopted by Marcus Gallius, when their father died in 33 BC, or when he assumed the toga virilis. Simpson personally argued against the time of adoption of his brother as a plausible time for his name change since Simpson believed the event may even have happened before Drusus was born; he also rejected the point of death of their father as likely since it would have probably have brought attention to the circumstances surrounding Livia's divorce and remarriage, which had become a part of Mark Antony's propaganda at the time. Simpson stated that in his opinion Livia chose the names Decimus and Drusus for her younger son to minimize association with her ex-husband after she married Octavian due to the former's poor status at the time, but that several years after the man's death it was opportune to emphasize her younger son's connection with his elder brother and that the name change was probably done upon him assuming the toga virilis. Levick believed the adoption of Tiberius necessitated Drusus wearing the name of the Nerones. Simpson responded 1993 in that he believes that Levick's interpretation is incompatible with Suetonius account as he cannot accept that Livia and Octavian (once married) would have allowed the adoption of the boy to take place at all, due to Gallius opposition of Octavian. Since Suetonius makes it clear that Tiberius did use Gallius' name (although briefly) but dropped it out of respect for his stepfather, the adoption must have happened before Drusus was born.

Jean Mottershead proposed in her commentary on Suetonius's Divus Claudius that Drusus' praenomen derived from his father's maternal side of the family, possibly the Junii or Laelii, as they were the only senatorial families who regularly used the praenomen "Decimus". She also believes that the name change happened when his father died and he moved into Octavian's household. Klaus Scherberich is critical of Mottershead's proposal, he argues that there are no examples of a conservative patrician family like the Claudii Nerones adopting a completely new praenomen from a maternal ancestor, especially when said gentes were non-patrician. Scherberich is also sceptical of Simpson's explanation.

Lindsay Powell believes that Drusus personally (despite his young age) may have changed his name directly after his father's death to preserve and honor his memory. In his opinion, another motivation for the boy may have been the meaning of the name Nero, which in ancient Sabine (the language of the people from whom the Claudii descended) meant "strong" or "valiant", a fitting name for a boy from such a distinguished clan.

== Marriage ==
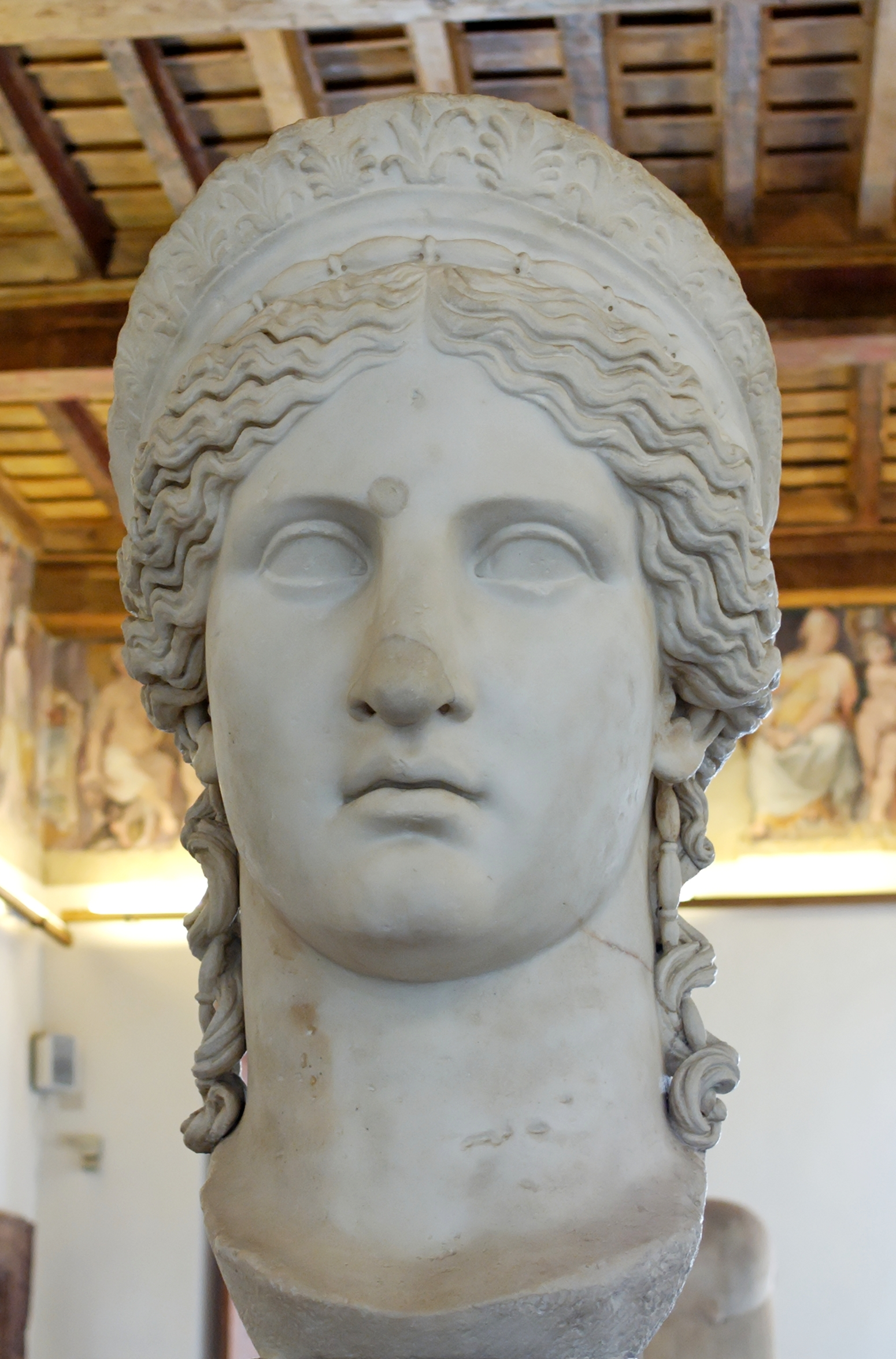
The Juno Ludovisi, a 1st-century AD depiction of Drusus' wife Antonia Minor as Juno

Drusus married Antonia Minor, the daughter of Mark Antony and Augustus' sister, Octavia Minor, and gained a reputation for being completely faithful to her. Their children were Germanicus, Claudius, a daughter named Livilla ('little Livia'), and at least two others who did not survive childhood. After Drusus' death, Antonia never remarried, though she outlived him by nearly five decades. Three emperors were direct descendants of Drusus: his son Claudius, his grandson Caligula, and his great-grandson Nero.

== Career ==
Augustus bestowed many honors on his stepsons. In 19 BC, Drusus was granted the ability to hold all public offices five years before the minimum age. When Tiberius left Italy during his term as praetor in 16 BC, Drusus legislated in his place. He became quaestor the following year, fighting against Raetian bandits in the Alps. Drusus repelled them, gaining honors, but was unable to smash their forces, and required reinforcement from Tiberius. The brothers easily defeated the local Alpine tribes.

Drusus arrived in Gaul in late 15 BC to serve as legatus Augusti pro praetore (governor on Augustus' behalf with the authority of a praetor) of the three Gaulish provinces. His contribution to the ongoing building and urban development in Gaul can be seen in the establishment of the pes Drusianus, or ‘Drusian foot’, of about 33.3 cm (13.1 in), which was in use in Samarobriva (modern Amiens) and among the Tungri. From 14 to 13 BC, Augustus himself was also active in Gaul, whether in Lugdunum (modern Lyon) or along the Rhine frontier.

As governor of Gaul, Drusus made his headquarters at Lugdunum, where he decided to establish the concilium Galliarum or ‘council of the Gaulish provinces’ sometime between 14 and 12 BC. This council would elect from its members a priest to celebrate games and venerate Rome and Augustus as deities every 1 August at the altar of the three Gauls that Drusus established at Condate in 10 BC. Drusus' son Tiberius—the future emperor Claudius—was born in Lugdunum on the same day that this altar was inaugurated.

=== Germanic campaigns ===
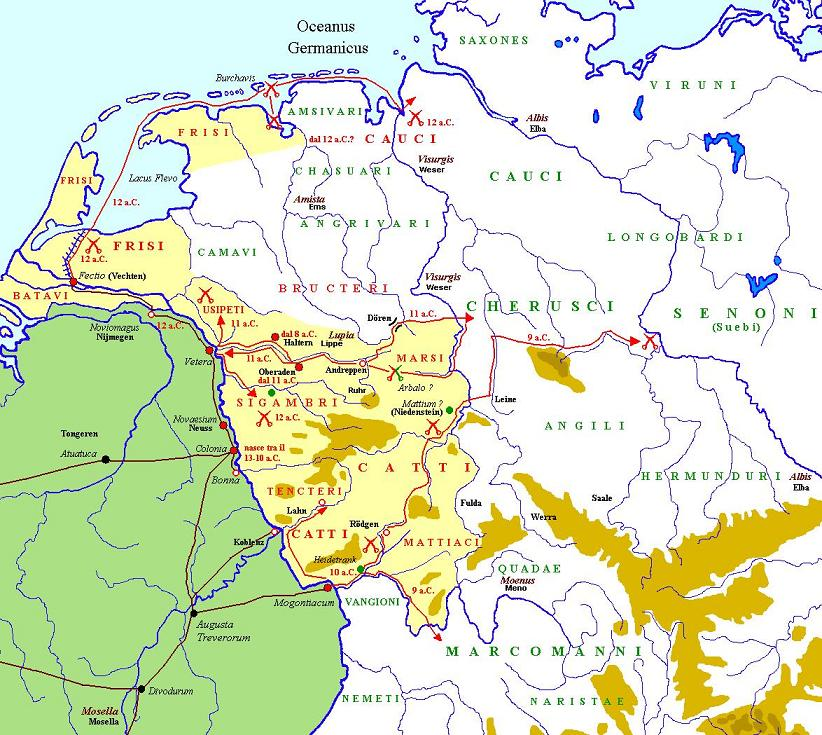
Map of Drusus' campaigns against the Germanic tribes, 12–9 BC

Starting in 14 BC, Drusus built a string of military bases along the Rhine—fifty according to Florus—and established an alliance with the Batavi in preparation for military action in Germania Libera. He is likely to have had seven legions under his command. In spring of 12 BC, he embarked an expeditionary force, perhaps consisting of the Legiones I Germanica and V Alaudae, by ship from the vicinity of modern Nijmegen, making use of one or more canals he had built for the purpose. Drusus sailed to the mouth of the Ems and penetrated into the territory of the Chauci in present-day Lower Saxony. The Chauci concluded a treaty acknowledging Roman supremacy, and would remain allies of Rome for years to come. As they continued to ascend the Ems, the Romans were attacked by the Bructeri in boats. Drusus' forces defeated the Bructeri, but, as it was now late in the campaign season, turned back for their winter quarters in Gaul, taking advantage of their new alliance with the Frisii to navigate through the difficult conditions on the North Sea.

As a reward for the successes of his campaign in 12 BC, Drusus was made praetor urbanus for 11 BC when he returned to Rome for the winter. News of Drusus' achievements – navigating the North Sea, carrying the Roman eagles into new territory, and fixing new peoples into treaty relations with Rome – caused considerable excitement in Rome and were commemorated on coins.

In the spring of his term as praetor urbanus, he set out for the German border once more. This time, he assembled a force consisting of all or part of five legions in addition to auxiliaries and, setting out from Vetera on the Rhine, ascended the River Lippe. Here he encountered the Tencteri and Usipetes, whom he defeated in two separate engagements. He reached the Werra Valley before deciding to turn back for the season, as winter was coming on, supplies were dwindling, and the omens were unfavorable. While his forces were making their way back through the territory of the Cherusci, the latter tribe laid an ambush for them at Arbalo. The Cherusci failed to capitalize on their initial advantage, whereupon the Romans broke through their lines, defeated the Germanic attackers, and acclaimed Drusus as imperator. To show his continued mastery of the ground, Drusus garrisoned a number of positions within Germania during the winter of 11–10 BC, including one somewhere in Hesse and one in Cheruscan territory, probably either the camp at Haltern or that at Bergkamen-Oberaden, both in present-day North Rhine–Westphalia.

He rejoined his wife, Antonia, and two children for a time in Lugdunum before the family returned to Rome, where Drusus reported to Augustus. Drusus was given the honor of an ovation, and for the third time, Augustus closed the doors of the Temple of Janus, signifying that the whole Roman world was then at peace. Drusus was granted the office of proconsul for the following year. In 10 BC, the Chatti joined with the Sicambri and attacked Drusus' camp, but they were driven back. Drusus pursued them, proceeding from the sites of present-day Mainz and Rödgen, where he set up a base of supply, to Hedemünden, where a strong new camp was established. Around this time, the canny Marcomannic king Maroboduus responded to the Roman incursion by relocating his people en masse to Bohemia. In the summer of 10 BC, Drusus left the field to return to Lugdunum, where he inaugurated the sanctuary of the Three Gaulish provinces at Condate on 1 August. Augustus and Tiberius were in Lugdunum for this occasion (when Drusus' youngest son Claudius was born), and afterwards Drusus accompanied them back to Rome.

Drusus easily won election as consul for the year 9 BC. Once more he left the city before assuming office. His consulship conferred the chance for Drusus to attain Rome's highest and rarest military honor, the spolia opima, or spoils of an enemy chieftain slain personally by an opposing Roman general who was fighting (as consuls did) under his own auspices. He quickly returned to the field, stopping to confer with his staff at Lugdunum and to dedicate a temple to Caesar Augustus at Andemantunnum, before rejoining his command at Mainz, from which the year's expedition departed in early spring. Drusus led the army via Rödgen through the territories of the Marsi and Cherusci until he even crossed the river Elbe. Here he is said to have seen an apparition of a Germanic woman who warned him against proceeding farther and that his death was near. Drusus turned back, erecting a trophy to commemorate his reaching the Elbe, perhaps on the site of Dresden or Magdeburg.

Drusus had sought out multiple Germanic (at least three) chieftains during his campaigns in Germany (12 BC–9 BC), engaging them in "dazzling displays of single combat". The sources are ambiguous, but suggest that he could have potentially taken the spolia opima from a Germanic king, thus becoming the fourth and final Roman to gain this honor. Regardless of whether he was actually able to take them in combat, however, Drusus' untimely death would prevent him from ever going through with the official ceremony. Notably, after Drusus' death, Augustus deposited the laurels from his fasces not in the Temple of Jupiter Optimus Maximus as he had done in the past, but in the Temple of Jupiter Feretrius. J.W. Rich suggests that this action was done as an affirmation to Drusus' memory; had the young commander lived, he would have placed spolia opima in the temple himself.

== Death and legacy ==
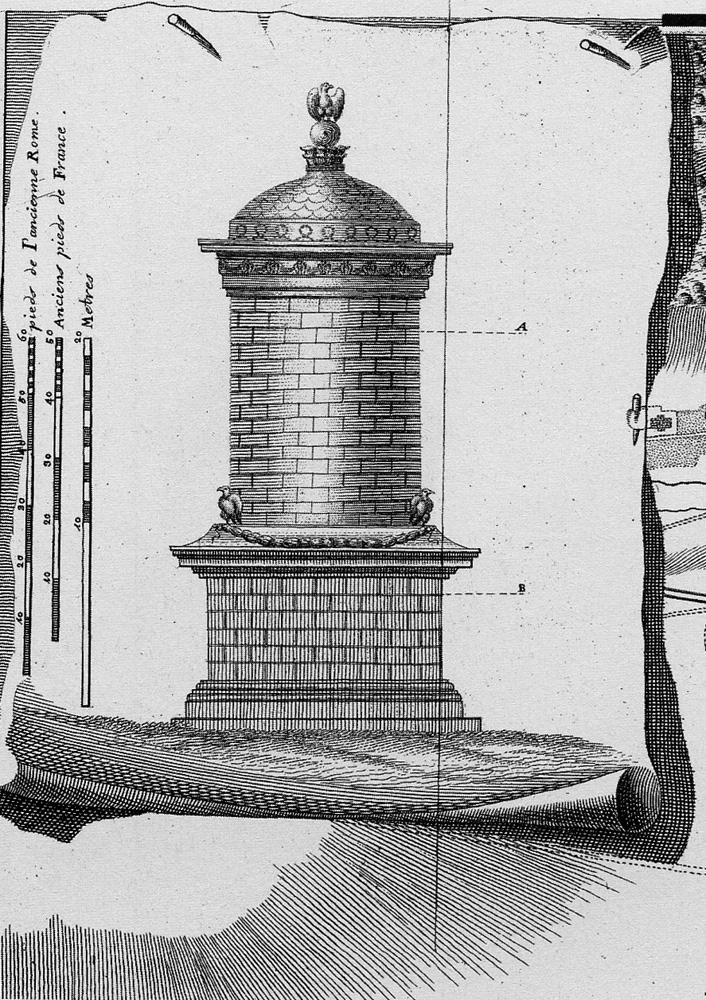
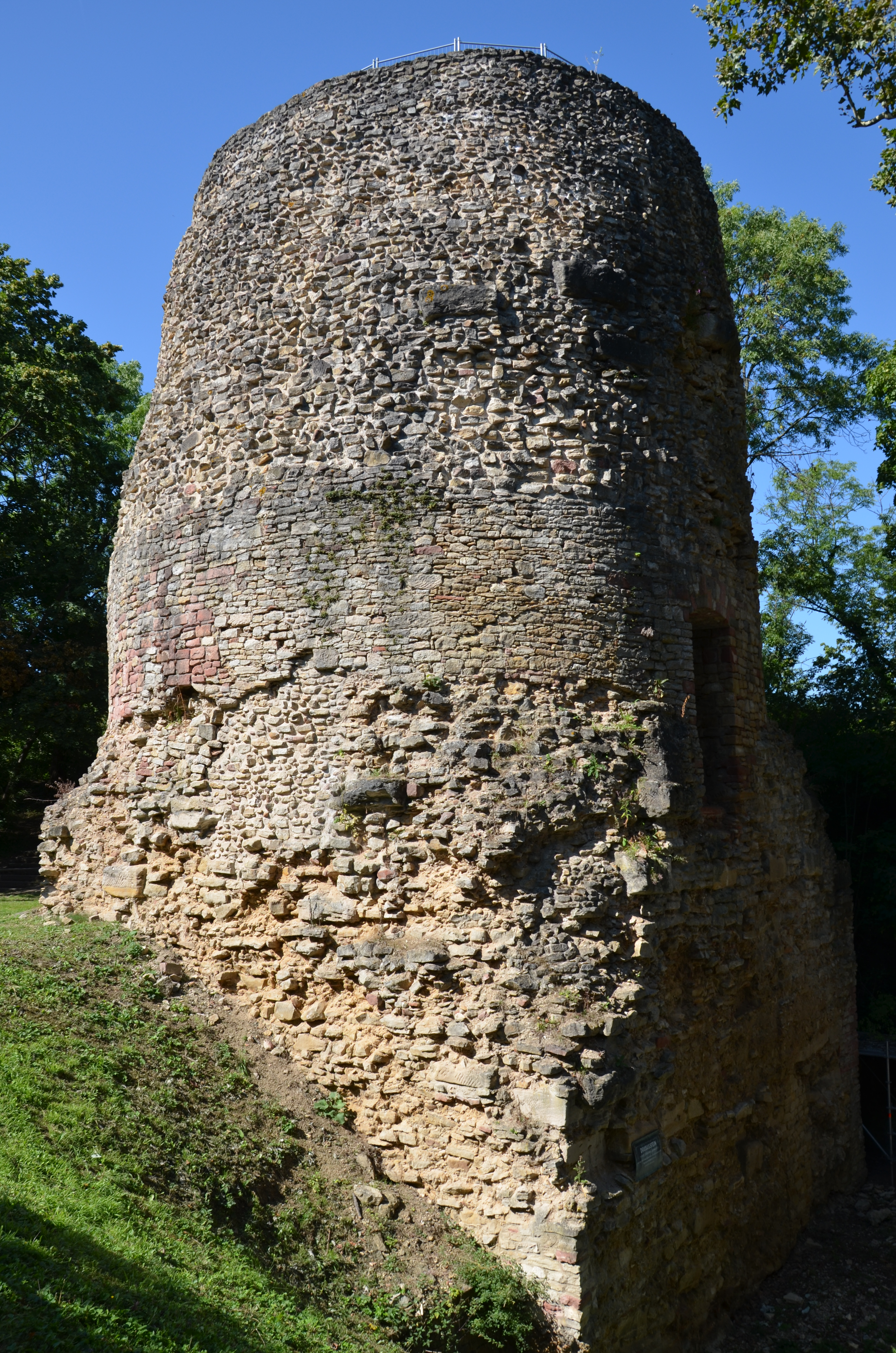
The Drususstein, the funerary monument in Mogontiacum (Mainz) erected by legionaries in Drusus' honor. Left, a reconstruction of its original appearance; right, its current appearance.

Drusus was returning from his advance to the Elbe when he fell from his horse, by which point Tiberius had joined him. Though he survived the initial accident, infection set in, and he died about a month later. Shortly before his death he wrote a letter to Tiberius complaining about the style in which Augustus ruled and discussed forcing him to restore the republic. Suetonius reports that he had refused to return to Rome just before his death. Drusus' body was brought back to the city, and his ashes were deposited in the Mausoleum of Augustus. He remained extremely popular with the legionaries, who erected a monument (the Drususstein) in Mogontiacum (modern Mainz) on his behalf. Remnants of this are still standing.

The Senate raised an arch on the Appian Way in his memory (unrelated to the Arch of Drusus) which read "DE GERM" and depicted his Elbe trophy as well as him fighting on horseback, a testament to his personal bravery. They also posthumously granted him the hereditary honorific title "Germanicus", which was given to his eldest son before passing to his youngest. It would be used by many members of the Julio-Claudian dynasty, including its last three emperors: his grandson Caligula, his son Claudius, and his great-grandson Nero. Augustus later wrote a biography of him, which does not survive. By Augustus' decree, festivals were held in Mogontiacum at Drusus' death day and probably also on his birthday.

Drusus' mother Livia, much affected by the death of her second son, took the advice of the philosopher Areus to put up many statues and images of Drusus and speak often about him. The surviving Latin work Consolatio ad Liviam is framed as an Ovidian message of consolation to Livia on this occasion, though it is generally considered a literary exercise "composed between the death of Livia [AD 29] and that of Tiberius [AD 37]".

Augustus noted the successes of Drusus' campaigns—for which, as Drusus' superior, he took credit—in his Res Gestae Divi Augusti, written in 14 AD:

I restored peace to the provinces of Gaul and Spain, likewise Germany, which includes the ocean from Cadiz to the mouth of the river Elbe. [...] I sailed my ships on the ocean from the mouth of the Rhine to the east region up to the borders of the Cimbri, where no Roman had gone before that time by land or sea, and the Cimbri and the Charydes and the Semnones and the other Germans of the same territory sought by envoys the friendship of me and of the Roman people.

— Augustus, Res Gestae Divi Augusti

Upon Claudius' accession to the principate in 41 AD, his late father Drusus received new public honors, including annual games in the Circus Maximus on 14 January for Drusus' birthday, coin issues depicting Drusus' likeness and his commemorative arch, and the restoration of a monument near the Ara Pacis Augustae that featured a statue of Drusus. Claudius also completed a road from Italy into Raetia that followed the route Drusus had taken and whose road-markers commemorated Drusus' achievements in the Alpine war. Such Claudian commemorations of Drusus' memory are thought to have become less prominent once Claudius had his own British triumph to celebrate.

Historian Michael McNally considers Drusus to have been the most able of the various Roman commanders who attempted to conquer Germania, as well as the most successful. While the furthest extent of territorial gains would be realized the year after his death, under Tiberius, Drusus' death marked a slowing of Roman expansion. Drusus' successors would prove unfit for the task of conquering Germania, with disastrous results. Drusus was succeeded as commander in Germania by Tiberius, but Tiberius fell out of imperial favor and chose self-exile in 6 BC. Command then fell to Lucius Domitius Ahenobarbus. Ahenobarbus was partly successful, becoming the first and last Roman general to cross the Elbe river, but was generally bogged down in suppressing revolts. Command then fell to Publius Quinctilius Varus, under whom the Battle of the Teutoburg Forest (also called the Varian disaster) would occur. The destruction of Varus' entire army marked the end of northward Roman expansion. The Rhine became the de facto border of the Roman Empire, rendering moot much of Drusus's life's work.

== Family tree ==
Family of Nero Claudius Drusus

Tiberius Claudius Nero	Unknown	Marcus Livius Drusus Claudianus	Alfidia
Tiberius Claudius Nero	Livia
Tiberius	Nero Claudius Drusus	Antonia Minor
Germanicus	Livilla	Claudius

== In popular culture ==
- He is a minor character in Robert Graves' historical novel I, Claudius, as well as the BBC's adaptation of the same title in which he was played by Ian Ogilvy.
- The annual festival celebrating Drusus' death is a main plot element in the second volume of the Romanike series by Codex Regius (2006–2014).
- He is a prominent character in the Hrabam Chronicles by Alaric Longward (2016).
- Drusus is also featured in the 2021-2023 SFX TV series Domina, which portrays him during his early teenage years in the first season, and during his career as a general in the second season.
- A bust of Drusus was purchased in 2018 from a Goodwill shop in Texas for $34.99, being later identified as an authentic antique. It is presumed that the bust was taken by American soldiers during World War II from Aschaffenburg, Germany, where it will be returned in 2023.

== See also ==
- Arch of Drusus

== Notes ==
Political offices
Preceded by Africanus Fabius Maximus, and Iullus Antonius	Consul of the Roman Empire; 9 BC with Titus Quinctius Crispinus Sulpicianus	Succeeded by Gaius Marcius Censorinus, and Gaius Asinius Gallus
