= Caelia gens =

Ancient Roman family

The gens Caelia was a plebeian family of ancient Rome. The nomen Caelius is frequently confounded with Coelius and Caecilius, with some individuals referred to as Caelius in manuscripts, while appearing as Coelius or Coilius on coins. Although the Caelii asserted their great antiquity, none of them attained any of the higher offices of the Roman state until the praetorship of Publius Caelius in 74 BC, and the first of this gens who obtained the consulship was Gaius Caelius Rufus in AD 17. The emperor Balbinus was a descendant of the Caelii.

== Origin ==
The Caelii claimed descent from the Etruscan hero, Caelius Vibenna, whose adventures were legendary in Etruria, but largely forgotten at Rome; the emperor Claudius, who was deeply interested in Etruscan culture, described the adventures of Caelius, his brother, Aulus Vibenna, and their companion, Macstarna, whom Claudius maintained was the same person as Servius Tullius, the sixth King of Rome. The famous François Tomb discovered at Vulci includes a fresco depicting one such episode, in which, aided by a companion, the three heroes and their friends escape from captivity, and slay an enemy named Gnaeus Tarquinius of Rome. Subsequently Vibenna and his followers settled at Rome, on the Querquetulan, or oak-covered hill, which in later times was generally known as the Caelian Hill, one of the famed seven hills of Rome.

== Praenomina ==
The main praenomina of the Caelii during the Republic were Marcus, Publius, Gaius, and Quintus, all amongst the most common names throughout Roman history. In imperial times, some of the Caelii used Gnaeus, also a common praenomen, and Decimus, which was somewhat more distinctive.

== Branches and cognomina ==
The only cognomen of this gens under the Republic was Rufus, originally typically given to a person with red hair. A variety of surnames are found in imperial times, including Censorinus, direct relative of a censor; Cursor, a runner; Pollio, originally a polisher of armor; and Sabinus, designating someone of Sabine descent or habits.

== Members ==
This list includes abbreviated praenomina. For an explanation of this practice, see filiation.

- Marcus Caelius, tribune of the plebs, attacked in a speech by Marcus Porcius Cato, the censor.
- Gaius Caelius, praetor about 90 BC.
- Publius Caelius, placed in command of Placentia by the consul Gnaeus Octavius in 87 BC, and when the town was taken by Cinna's army, he caused himself to be put to death, rather than fall into the hands of the Marian party.
- Publius Caelius (P. f.), praetor in 74 BC.
- Marcus Caelius, an eques, from whom Verres took away several silver vases, in 71 BC.
- Gaius Caelius, tribune of the plebs in 51 BC, with several of his colleagues vetoed the senate's decrees directed against Caesar.
- Marcus Caelius Rufus, praetor peregrinus in 48 BC, during the Civil War, deprived of his office after deliberately causing a riot, and subsequently slain by the cavalry, whom he attempted to bribe to surrender the city of Thurii.
- Quintus Caelius, a friend and follower of Marcus Antonius, attacked by Cicero.
- Caelius, a moneylender, with whom Cicero had some dealings.
- Caelius Cursor, an eques, put to death by Tiberius, for having falsely charged the praetor Magius Caecilianus with treason.
- Marcus Caelius T. f., primus pilus of Legio XVIII, died during the Battle of the Teutoburg Forest in AD 9.
- Publius Caelius T. f., built the cenotaph of his brother Marcus Caelius, the primus pilus.
- Gaius Caelius Rufus, consul in AD 17.
- Caelius Pollio, commander of the Roman army in Armenia in AD 51, bribed by Rhadamistus to betray the cause of Mithridates, the Roman client king.
- Gnaeus Arulenus Caelius Sabinus, a jurist, appointed consul by the emperor Otho in AD 69, and retained by Vitellius.
- Quintus Caelius Honoratus, consul suffectus in AD 105.
- Decimus Caelius Calvinus Balbinus, Roman emperor with Marcus Clodius Pupienus in AD 238.
- Caelius Apicius, the attributed author of a culinary treatise in ten books, probably in the first century AD.
- Caelius Firmianus Symposius, a poet, and the author of a series of riddles, of uncertain date.
- Caelius Aurelianus, a physician of uncertain date during the imperial period.
- Gaius Caelius Saturninus signo Dogmatius, praetorian prefect under Constantine I.
- Gaius Caelius Censorinus, governor of Campania and suffect consul under Constantine I.
- Caelius Censorinus, governor of Numidia between 375 and 378, and possibly a property owner at Baiae.

== See also ==
- List of Roman gentes

== Bibliography ==
=== Ancient sources ===
- Lucius Cassius Dio Cocceianus (Cassius Dio), Roman History.
- Marcus Tullius Cicero, Epistulae ad Atticum, Epistulae ad Familiares, In Verrem, Philippicae, Pro Flacco.
- Aulus Gellius, Noctes Atticae (Attic Nights).
- Publius Cornelius Tacitus, Annales.
- Valerius Maximus, Factorum ac Dictorum Memorabilium (Memorable Facts and Sayings).
- Marcus Terentius Varro, De Lingua Latina (On the Latin Language).

=== Modern sources ===
- T. Robert S. Broughton, The Magistrates of the Roman Republic, American Philological Association (1952).
- Cassell's Latin and English Dictionary, D.P. Simpson, ed., Macmillan Publishing Company, New York (1963).
- George Davis Chase, "The Origin of Roman Praenomina", in Harvard Studies in Classical Philology, vol. VIII, pp. 103–184 (1897).
- Dictionary of Greek and Roman Biography and Mythology, William Smith, ed., Little, Brown and Company, Boston (1849).
- Jones, A.H.M.; J.R. Martindale & J. Morris (1971–1992). Prosopography of the Later Roman Empire. Cambridge University Press. ISBN 0-521-07233-6.
- Theodor Mommsen et alii, Corpus Inscriptionum Latinarum (The Body of Latin Inscriptions, abbreviated CIL), Berlin-Brandenburgische Akademie der Wissenschaften (1853–present).
- Oxford Classical Dictionary, N. G. L. Hammond and H. H. Scullard, eds., Clarendon Press, Oxford (Second Edition, 1970).
- August Pauly; Georg Wissowa; Wilhelm Kroll; Kurt Witte; Karl Mittelhaus; Konrat Ziegler, eds. (1894–1980). Paulys Realencyclopädie der classischen Altertumswissenschaft. Stuttgart: J. B. Metzler.
