= Quintus Futius Lusius Saturninus =

Roman senator and suffect consul of AD 41

Quintus Futius Lusius Saturninus was a Roman senator, who lived during the reign of Claudius. He was suffect consul in the nundinium of September to October 41 with Marcus Seius Varanus as his colleague. Tacitus lists Saturninus as one of the victims of the notorious Publius Suillius Rufus, whose prosecution on behalf of the emperor Claudius or his wives led to the deaths of a number of Senators and equites. Seneca the Younger mentions him in his Apocolocyntosis divi Claudii as one of his consular friends who confront Claudius in the afterworld as being responsible for their deaths.

These literary sources from the Principate refer to him by his last two names, Lusius Saturninus; his full name is known from an inscription found in Dalmatia dated to his consulate. Based on this evidence, Olli Salomies argues in his monograph on the naming practices of the Early Empire that his name indicates that he was born in the gens Lusia, but later adopted by a Quintus Futius. An inscription attests to the existence of a Quintus Futius, suffect consul with a Publius Calvisius in a nundinium in one of the years from AD 49 through 54.

Political offices
Preceded by Quintus Pomponius Secundus, and Gnaeus Sentius Saturninus	Suffect consul of the Roman Empire; 41 with Marcus Seius Varanus	Succeeded by Quintus Ostorius Scapula, and Publius Suillius Rufus as suffect consuls
