= Sanquinia gens =

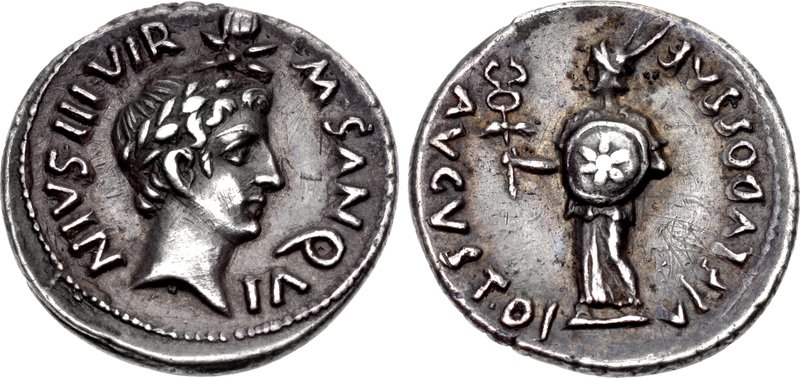
Denarius of Quintus Sanquinius, 17 BC. The obverse depicts the head of Caesar, with his comet above. On the reverse is the herald of the Secular Games, holding a shield and a winged caduceus.

The gens Sanquinia (Note: Frequently misspelled as Sanguinius, particularly for Q. Sanquinius Maximus in Tacitus.) was a minor plebeian family at ancient Rome, which rose out of obscurity in imperial times to attain the highest offices of the Roman state. Members of this gens are first mentioned in the time of Augustus, and Quintus Sanquinius Maximus held the consulship under Tiberius and Caligula. The family vanishes from history in the time of Claudius.

== Origin ==
Ronald Syme described the gens as Etruscan, thanks to an inscription found in Etruria.

== Branches and cognomina ==
There may only have been a single family of the Sanquinii, as all of those occurring in history come from the same time and place, and only one other is added from inscriptions anywhere else. The only attested surname, Maximus, seems to have been a personal cognomen, and was probably given to the consul Sanquinius either because he was the eldest brother in his family, or because he was the most illustrious of the Sanquinii.

== Members ==
This list includes abbreviated praenomina. For an explanation of this practice, see filiation.

- Quintus Sanquinius Q. f., held a number of magistracies, including those of quaestor, tribune of the plebs, praetor, and proconsul, at the end of the Republic or beginning of the reign of Augustus.
- Marcus Sanquinius Q. f. Q. n., a triumvir monetalis in 17 BC. His coins celebrate the Ludi Saeculares held by Augustus that year.
- Quintus Sanquinius M. f. Q. n. Maximus, consul suffectus in an uncertain year during the reign of Tiberius, and a second time under Caligula in AD 39. He was praefectus urbi under Caligula, and governor of Germania Inferior under Claudius. He died in office in AD 47.
- Sanquinius, one of the accusers of Lucius Arruntius, a man of unblemished character, during the tumult that followed the downfall of Sejanus. The senate, weary of constant charges of treason, instead chose to punish the accusers. He must be a different man than the consular Sanquinius, who had argued for amnesty and an end to the accusations.
- Sanquinia C. f., named in an inscription from Caere in Etruria.

== See also ==
- List of Roman gentes
