= Publius Suillius Rufus =

1st century AD Roman senator, consul and provincial governor

Publius Suillius Rufus was a Roman senator who was active during the Principate. He was notorious for his prosecutions during the reign of Claudius; and he was the husband of the step-daughter of Ovid. Rufus was suffect consul in the nundinium of November-December 41 as the colleague of Quintus Ostorius Scapula.

Rufus was the son of Vistilia; the name of his father has not been recorded. His half-brothers include Gnaeus Domitius Corbulo, consul of 39, and his half-sister was Milonia Caesonia.

== Career ==
His first known office was quaestor and was assigned to Germanicus. However, for Germanicus to have a quaestor, he needed to hold imperium, which he would as consul (Germanicus was consul in the years 12 and 18), or if granted that by the Senate (which he was as proconsul 17 September 14); Ronald Syme has argued the date of Rufus' quaestorship was AD 15. Syme further argued that Rufus was praetor four years afterwards.

In the year 24 Rufus was prosecuted and convicted of taking bribes for his judicial decisions. Although at first the proposed punishment was exile from Italy, he was instead relegated to an island. After the death of Tiberius, Rufus returned from exile to Rome. During the reign of Claudius, Rufus prosecuted a number of people on behalf of the emperor. His targets included several of the clients of Gaius Silius. In an attempt to bring down Suillius Rufus, Silius demanded that the Senate enforce the Lex Cincia, which forbade lawyers from being compensated after pleading a case. In the end, the emperor Claudius intervened, and allowed Rufus to collect a maximum of ten thousand sesterces as his fee for successful prosecution. Another target was Julia Livia, who had stirred the animosity of the empress Valeria Messalina; Rufus accused her of immoral conduct, and the prosecution resulted in her death in AD 43. Tacitus provides a list of his further victims: Decimus Valerius Asiaticus, Quintus Futius Lusius Saturninus (consul 41), Cornelius Lupus (consul 42) as well as "troops of Roman equites."

The sortition awarded Rufus the proconsular governorship of Asia, which Syme dates to the term 53/54.

Eventually, Suilius Rufus met his fate: during the reign of Nero, Seneca successfully prosecuted him. According to Tacitus, "with the loss of half his property, his son and granddaughter being allowed to retain the other half, and what they had inherited under their mother's or grandmother's will being exempted from confiscation, Suilius was banished to the Balearic isles. ... Rumor said that he supported that lonely exile by a life of ease and plenty."

== Family ==
Ovid identifies Suillius as the husband of his step-daughter in his Epistulae ex Ponto, but does not name her. Ovid does drop the hint that his wife, whom he also never names, was one of the Fabii, but offers little explicit information about either woman beyond that.

Suillius had two sons by this marriage. One, Suillius Caesoninus, was banished due to his participation in a scandal involving Messalina. The other, Marcus Suillius Nerullinus, was consul ordinarius in 50.

== Notes ==
Political offices
Preceded by Quintus Futius Lusius Saturninus, and Marcus Seius Varanus as Suffect consul	Suffect consul of the Roman Empire; 41 with Quintus Ostorius Scapula	Succeeded by Claudius IV, and Gaius Caecina Largus as Ordinary consuls
