= Tedia gens =

Ancient Roman family

The gens Tedia or Teidia was a minor plebeian family at ancient Rome. Only a few members of this gens are mentioned in history, but they had reached senatorial rank by the first century BC, and Sextus Tedius Valerius Catullus attained the consulship in AD 31. Other Tedii are known from inscriptions.

== Origin ==
Chase classifies the nomen Teidius among those gentilicia that did not originate at Rome, but from one of the northern Italic languages, spoken in Umbria, Picenum, Sabinum, or the southern parts of Latium, although he cannot be more specific as to its origin. The spelling Tedius is more common overall, but Teidius is the usual form found in inscriptions from Samnium, while both forms appear in Venetia and Histria.

== Praenomina ==
The main praenomina of the Tedii were Quintus and Sextus, both of which were common throughout Roman history, after which they used other common names, including Aulus, Gaius, Lucius, Marcus, and Publius. In filiations we find the less common Manius, along with Spurius, which had once been a common praenomen, but which by imperial times had fallen out of favour, and was typically used for the filiations of those born out of wedlock, except in families that had traditionally used it as a praenomen.

== Members ==
This list includes abbreviated praenomina. For an explanation of this practice, see filiation.

- Publius Teidius P. f., a priest named along with Lucius Furius Crassipes, perhaps the same Crassipes who was governor of Macedonia at an uncertain date, in an inscription from Samothrace, dating from the second century BC, or the first half of the first.
- Sextus Tedius, a Roman senator, delivered the body of Publius Clodius Pulcher to Rome, following the latter's death in a fracas with the servants of Titus Annius Milo in 52 BC.
- Lucius Teidius L. f., named in a sepulchral inscription from Beneventum in Samnium, dating from the middle portion of the first century BC.
- Tedius Afer, consul elect in the time of the Second Triumvirate, sharply criticized an action of Octavian, who in response threatened him so fearfully that Tedius took his own life.
- Teidia Sex. f., named in a sepulchral inscription from Rome, dating from the latter half of the first century BC, along with her husband, Licinus, and son, Capito.
- Aulus Teidius, one of the duumvirs at Buthrotum in Macedonia at some point during the reign of Augustus.
- Quintus Tedius, a friend of Augustus, infamous for the excesses of his lifestyle.
- Tedia Q. f. Marcella, named in a sepulchral inscription from Piquentum in Venetia and Histria, dating from the first quarter of the first century.
- Tedia Prima, buried at Piquentum, in a tomb dating from the first quarter of the first century.
- Tedia Sp. f. Procula, together with the freedman Tiberius Barbius Verio Liberalis, built a sepulchre at Aquileia in Venetia and Histria, dating from the first quarter of the first century.
- Teidia Sex. l., a freedwoman, was an obstetrix, or midwife, named along with the freedman Sextus Teidius Anteros, in an inscription from Rome, dating from the first half of the first century.
- Sextus Teidius Sex. l. Anteros, a freedman named along with the midwife Teidia in an inscription from Rome, dating from the first half of the first century.
- Quintus Teidius Donatus, together with Teidia Zosima, dedicated a tomb at Tergeste in Venetia and Histria for their son, Teidius Eulimenus, dating from the first half of the first century.
- Teidius Q. f. Eulimenus, buried at Tergeste, in a tomb built by his parents, Quintus Teidius Donatus and Teidia Zosima, dating from the first half of the first century.
- Sextus Tedius Ɔ. l. Felix, a freedman, named along with the freedwoman Tedia Fortunata, in an inscription from Cora in Latium, dating from the first half of the first century.
- Tedia Sex. f. Fortunata, a freedwoman, named along with the freedman Sextus Tedius Felix, in an inscription from Cora, dating from the first half of the first century.
- Tedia Ɔ. l. Leucas, a freedwoman, built a family sepulchre at Rome, dating from the first half of the first century, for her husband, the freedman Gaius Julius Hyescus, and her freedwoman, Helpis.
- Gaius Teidius C. l. Philomusus, a freedman buried at Interpromium in Samnium, in a tomb dating from the first half of the first century BC.
- Teidia Zosima, together with Quintus Teidius Donatus, dedicated a tomb at Tergeste, dating from the first half of the first century, for their son, Teidius Eulimenus.
- Quintus Tedius Ɔ. l. Germullus, a freedman mentioned in an inscription from Rome, dating from AD 28 and 29.
- Sextus Tedius L. f. Valerius Catullus, (Note: Teidius in some inscriptions.) consul suffectus from the Kalends of May to the Kalends of October in AD 31; his colleague was Faustus Cornelius Sulla. He is believed to have been the son of Lucius Valerius Catullus, a pontifex, but was adopted by a senator named Sextus Tedius.
- Tedia Felicula, made a donation of six pots at Rome, some time between the death of Augustus and the middle of the first century.
- Quintus Tedius Q. l. Nomentinus, named in a first-century sepulchral inscription from Rome.
- Tedia Hedones, a friend of Camaronia Plecusa, a freedwoman who built a sepulchre at Aquileia, dating from the middle of the first century, for several freedmen and her friend, Tedia.
- Tedia Salbilla, built a tomb at Luna in Etruria, for her daughter, Eppia Demetrias, dating between the middle of the first century and the early second century.
- Tedia Grapte, dedicated a tomb at Rome for her husband, Atticianus, a medicus, or doctor, aged forty-two, dating from the reign of Domitian, together with her husband's friend, Fructus, brother, Philetus, and son, Lesbius.
- Quintus Tedius Firmus, dedicated a late first-century monument at Theveste in Africa Proconsularis for his wife, Julia Lycoris.
- Marcus Tedius Sabinus, buried at Ricina in Picenum, aged thirty, in a first- or second-century tomb built by his wife, Decimia Sabina.
- Gaius Tedius Salutaris, made a donation for the cult of Jupiter at Pisaurum in Umbria, some time between the reigns of Nerva and Antoninus Pius.
- Quintus Tedius Rivus, one of the duumvirs at Puteoli in Campania during the early second century.
- Gaius Tedius Proculus, a naive of Butrium in Cisalpine Gaul, was an optio in the sixth cohort of the Praetorian Guard, serving in the century of Priscus, in AD 143.
- Tedia Crescentina, dedicated a second-century tomb at Parma in Cisalpine Gaul for her husband and daughter, whose names have been lost. Her husband lived forty-five years, six months, and twenty-three days; her daughter seventeen years, six months, and seventeen days.
- Quintus Tedius Ɔ. l. Euhemerus, a freedman, along with his son, Quintus Tedius Fortunatus, built a second-century tomb at Corfinium in Samnium for Tedia Fortunata, his wife of forty years.
- Tedia Fortunata, the wife of Quintus Tedius Euhemerus, to whom she had been married for forty years, and mother of Quintus Tedius Fortunatus. Father and son built a second-century tomb at Corfinium for Fortunata.
- Quintus Tedius Ɔ. l. Fortunatus, a freedman, and the son of Quintus Tedius Euhemerus, with whom he built a second-century tomb at Corfinium for his mother, Tedia Fortunata.
- Quintus Tedius Gallus, foster son of Lucius Caninius Felix, for whom he built a second-century tomb at Rome, along with Caninia Calliste, the wife, and perhaps freedwoman, of Caninius.
- Quintus Tedius Maximus, made an offering to Jupiter Optimus Maximus at Heliopolis in Syria, dating from the reign of Antoninus Pius. He is probably to be identified with the Quintus Tedius Maximus who made a similar offering of unknown date at Athens.
- Quintus Tedius, buried in a late second-century tomb at Theveste.
- Sextus Tedius Priscus, a man of aedilician rank, named in an inscription from Canusium in Apulia, dating from AD 223.

=== Undated Tedii ===
- Teidius, perhaps the master of a slave named Turpio, named in an inscription from Atria in Venetia and Histria.
- Teidius M. f., named in an inscription from Atria.
- Quintus Tedius, named in a bronze inscription from Mediolanum in Gallia Narbonensis, along with Primus, a slave.
- Quintus Teidius M'. l., a freedman named in an inscription from Atria.
- Sextus Tedius Sex. f., named in an inscription from Rome.
- Quintus Tedius Antiochus, named in a sepulchral inscription from Rome.
- Aulus Tedius A. f. Au[...], a prefect of uncertain type, buried at Syracuse in Sicily.
- Teidia L. l. Caesia, a freedwoman named in an inscription from Atria.
- Tedia Crispina, named in an inscription from Aquileia.
- Teidia Sex. l. Dora, a freedwoman buried at Rome, along with the freedwoman Junia Gnome, in a tomb built by Marcus Junius Nereus.
- Tedia Felicula, dedicated a tomb at Rome for her husband, the freedman Aulus Fabius Faustus.
- Quintus Teidius Q. l. Hil[...], a freedman named in an inscription from Atria.
- Teidia Hilara, a freedwoman named in a sepulchral inscription from Tergeste, along with the freedman Quintus Teidius Sodala.
- Tedia Ɔ. l. Jucunda, a freedwoman named in an inscription from Atria.
- Quintus Tedius Maximus, made an offering to Jupiter Optimus Maximus, Venus, and Mercury at Athens in Achaia.
- Tedia Nice, dedicated a tomb at Rome for her husband, Titus Pascellius Thelgontis, along with her son, Titus Pascellius Moderatus.
- Teidia M. l. Phi[...], a freedwoman buried at the present site of Pietradefusi, formerly part of Samnium, along with the freedman Numisius A[...].
- Teidia M. l. Prima, a freedwoman named in an inscription from Atria.
- Tedia Pudentilla, the wife of Decimus Laberius Eleuther, with whom she dedicated a tomb at Rome for their son, Decimus Laberius Pudens, aged nine years, nine months, and twenty-one days.
- Quintus Teidius Q. l. Sodala, a freedman named in an inscription from Tergeste, along with the freedwoman Teidia Hilara.
- Tedius Tertius, named in an inscription from Rome, along with Marcia Gnome and Sillia Fausta.
- Publius Tedius Sp. f. Valens, a native of Tergeste, and a signifer, or standard-bearer, in the Legio IV Flavia Felix, buried at Parentium, in Venetia and Histria.
- Quintus Tedius Victor, made an offering to the gods at Theveste.

== See also ==
- List of Roman gentes

== Bibliography ==
- Quintus Asconius Pedianus, Commentarius in Oratio Ciceronis Pro Milone (Commentary on Cicero's Oration Pro Milone).
- Publius Cornelius Tacitus, Annales.
- Gaius Suetonius Tranquillus, De Vita Caesarum (Lives of the Caesars, or The Twelve Caesars).
- Dictionary of Greek and Roman Biography and Mythology, William Smith, ed., Little, Brown and Company, Boston (1849).
- Theodor Mommsen et alii, Corpus Inscriptionum Latinarum (The Body of Latin Inscriptions, abbreviated CIL), Berlin-Brandenburgische Akademie der Wissenschaften (1853–present).
- Ettore Pais, Corporis Inscriptionum Latinarum Supplementa Italica (Italian Supplement to the Corpus Inscriptionum Latinarum), Rome (1884).
- René Cagnat et alii, L'Année épigraphique (The Year in Epigraphy, abbreviated AE), Presses Universitaires de France (1888–present).
- George Davis Chase, "The Origin of Roman Praenomina", in Harvard Studies in Classical Philology, vol. VIII, pp. 103–184 (1897).
- Inscriptiones Italiae (Inscriptions from Italy), Rome (1931-present).
- Bruna Forlati Tamaro, "Iscrizioni Inedite di Adria" (Unedited Inscriptions from Adria), in Epigraphica, vol. 18, pp. 50–76 (1956).
- Skënder Anamali, Hasan Ceka, and Élizabeth Deniaux, Corpus des Inscriptions Latines d'Albanie (The Body of Latin Inscriptions from Albania, abbreviated CIA), École Française de Rome (2009).
- Narcisa Bolšec Ferri et al., Monografija Grada Umaga (Monograph on the City of Umaga), Umag (2012).
- Carlo Slavich, La collezione epigrafica della Casa Museo dell'Antiquariato Ivan Bruschi di Arezzo (Opuscula Epigrafica), Edizioni Quasar, Rome (2019).
