= Lucius Fulcinius Trio =

Early 1st century AD Roman senator, consul and prosecutor

Lucius Fulcinius Trio (died AD 35) was a Roman senator who came from a plebeian family. Trio was an active prosecutor (delator) during the reign of Tiberius who developed a reputation for making accusations. He was governor of Lusitania from about 21 to 31, before returning to Rome to hold the office of consul suffect with Publius Memmius Regulus in 31. His friendship with Sejanus would lead to allegations that ended with his suicide in early 35.

== Background ==
Trio may have been from the Fulcinii, a plebeian family still active in politics during the Principate. His family had not yet achieved the rank of consul, he himself being honored with the rank of consul suffectus, which was generally reserved for novi homes. Rutledge reasons his family was therefore not likely of noble lineage.

He may have had a brother named Gaius Fulcinius Trio, attested as praetor peregrinus in 24.

== Career ==
Trio's first recorded accusation was that against praetor Marcus Scribonius Libo and his brother Lucius Scribonius Libo, although Trio had already developed a reputation as a prosecutor (accusator; lit. "accuser"). Trio was an imitator of the aggressive oratory style of Cassius Severus.

Trio is first seen joining the prosecution against the Scribonii brothers in 16. Marcus Scribonius Libo and Lucius Scribonius Libo were accused of conspiring against the emperor. The other accusators were "new men" Firmius Catus, Fonteius Agrippa, and Vibius Serenus. Serenus headed the prosecution, with the rest as subscriptores. Libo killed himself on 13 September 16, before the trial could be completed. Libo's goods were divided among the prosecutors, and they were all (except Serenus) elevated to the rank of praetor (extra ordinem). This trial is the earliest example of Tiberius rewarding prosecutors with political advancement, which would become a recurring theme throughout his rule.

Trio is again an accuser in 20 CE in the trial against Gnaeus Calpurnius Piso, for which he received an imperial commendation. He worked alongside Servaeus, Veranius, and Vitellius to lay down the charges against Piso, which include: provincial mismanagement, tampering with the army in Syria, and the murder of Germanicus with poison. Trio prosecuted him for financial mismanagement, the least pressing of the charges. The prosecutors were all given priesthoods, except Trio, who was advised by Tiberius to tone down his antagonizing rhetoric, but was promised future political advancement in place of a priesthood. True to his word, Tiberius made him governor of Lusitania.

=== Governor of Lusitania ===
He was governor (legatus Augusti) of the province Lusitania for 10 years, from around 21 to 31 AD. During his time there a Lucius Cornelius Bocchus served as his praefectus fabrum (lit. "prefect of engineers"), but was effectively his chief administrative assistant. Trio had to promote the imperial cult and build the "Temple of the Deified Augustus" in the new forum of Augusta Emerita, a work that Bocchus would be in charge of. He constructed the temple in the new forum using marble. The temple in the old forum was granite.

While still in Lusitania, on 21 January 31, Trio offered shared client status to several freemen of the Stertinia family. Their names were: Q. (Quintus) Stertinius Bassus, Q. Stertinius Rufus, and Lucius Stertinius Rufinus. Bassus was the father of Rufus and the grandfather of Rufinus. (Note: AE 1953, 88; Dessau 1897, p. 91)

=== Consul suffect ===
On 1 July 31, Trio became consul suffect, replacing his friend Sejanus in that role. Cassius Dio says the office was given to him by Sejanus. From 1 October he shared the consulship with Publius Memmius Regulus, (Note: CIL X, 1233; Dessau 1897, p. 91) only 17 days before the fall of Sejanus on 18 October. Regulus took the lead in removing Sejanus. Tiberius did not trust Trio with any role in the overthrow.

The fall of Sejanus was not good for Trio. He had made many enemies in the Roman elite. The families of those he had previously accused, Libo and Piso, were friends of each other with many connections in the senate. He clung to his position and took a lead in the executions of those accused of conspiring with Sejanus, but it did no good; he was accused of being a follower of Sejanus. Trio accused Regulus of slacking in his investigations against Sejanus' alleged plot. Their accusations against each other went nowhere thanks to the intervention of other senators.

== Downfall ==
In AD 32 Decimus Haterius Agrippa attacked both Regulus and Trio to better his political position. The Senate again put a stop it. Quintus Sanquinius Maximus had Trio's trial postponed as to not give anxiety to the emperor. "This secured the safety of Regulus and the postponement of Trio's ruin" according to Tacitus. Haterius Agrippa wasn't popular and Cassius Dio says Tiberius was still grateful for Trio's performance in prosecuting Libo.

In 35, Trio was accused and thrown in prison as a friend of Sejanus and for allegedly supporting his cause. He would have been brought to trial if he had not taken his own life first. He left a will insulting Tiberius and Macro which his sons tried to suppress, but the emperor had made public in a display of tolerance of free speech in others.

== Sources ==
- Almagro-Gorbea, Martín (2011), Lucius Cornelius Bocchus escritor lusitano da Idade de Prata da Literatura Latina (in Spanish), Real Academia de la Historia, ISBN 9788415069362
- Ayres, Philip J.; Jonson, Ben (1990), Sejanus: His Fall, Manchester University Press, ISBN 9780719015427
- Cooley, Alison E. (2012), The Cambridge Manual of Latin Epigraphy, Cambridge: University Press, ISBN 9781139576604
- Dessau, Hermann (1897). Prosopographia Imperii Romani Saec I. II. III. Berlin. p. 91.
- McHugh, John S. (2020), Sejanus: Regent of Rome, Pen and Sword History, ISBN 9781526715005
- Pagán, Victoria Emma (2013), Conspiracy Narratives in Roman History, University of Texas Press, ISBN 9780292758810
- Pohl, John M. D.; Lyons, Claire L., eds. (2016), Altera Roman Art and Empire from Merida to Mexico, Cotsen Institute of Archaeology Press, ISBN 9781938770357
- Rutledge, Steven H. (2002), Imperial Inquisitions: Prosecutors and Informants from Tiberius to Domitian, Routledge, ISBN 9781134560608

Political offices
Preceded by Faustus Cornelius Sulla Lucullus, and Sextus Tedius Valerius Catullus as Consul suffectus	Suffect Consul of the Roman Empire; 31 with Faustus Cornelius Sulla Lucullus, followed by Publius Memmius Regulus	Succeeded by Gnaeus Domitius Ahenobarbus, and Lucius Arruntius Camillus Scribonianus as Consul ordinarius
