= Seii =

Sei may refer to:

- the plural of Seia gens, a minor plebeian family of equestrian rank at ancient Rome
- Seii (Ryukyu), the second king of the Okinawan kingdom of Chūza
