= Quintus Sanquinius Maximus =

1st century AD Roman senator, consul, urban prefect and provincial governor

Quintus Sanquinius Maximus (died AD 47) was a senator of the early Roman Empire, who flourished during the Principate. He is attested as suffect consul in AD 39, replacing the emperor Caligula. However, based on Tactius' enigmatic description of Maximus as "ex-consul" in the year 32, Ronald Syme asserts this attested consulate was his second, and that he was suffect consul in the year 28. If Maximus held two consulates, then he would be the first person who was not a member of the imperial house to receive this honour since 26 BC; only two other men not part of the imperial house of the Julio-Claudians -- Lucius Vitellius, consul in 34, 43 and 47, and Marcus Vinicius, consul in 30 and 45 -- are known to have achieved the consulate more than once between that year and the Flavian dynasty, when multiple consulships became less rare.

The first recorded act of Sanquinius Maximus was in 32, when he defended two consuls who held the fasces in the previous year, Publius Memmius Regulus and Lucius Fulcinius Trio, against the prosecution of the delator Decimus Haterius Agrippa. Trio, an ally of the powerful praetorian prefect Sejanus, and Regulus had argued constantly during their shared tenure and had threatened to prosecute each other. During the trial, Agrippa asked why the two, who had threatened each other while in office, now were silent. Trio responded that it was more proper to efface the memories of rivalries and quarrels between colleagues. Maximus took advantage of Trio's response and proposed that the Senate defer judgment of this suit to the emperor, thus avoiding further conflict which would increase the emperor's anxieties. "This secured the safety of Regulus and the postponement of Trio's ruin," Tacitus tells us, and adds, "Haterius was hated all the more."

In 39, the same year Sanquinius Maximus acceded to the consulate, he was also appointed urban prefect, an office he held until the year 41. A few years later he was appointed governor of the imperial province of Germania Inferior, where he died in the year 47, towards the end of his tenure.

Political offices
Preceded by Caligula II, and Lucius Apronius Caesianus as ordinary consuls	Suffect consul of the Roman Empire; 39 with Lucius Apronius Caesianus	Succeeded by Gnaeus Domitius Corbulo, and ignotus as suffect consuls
