= Publius Memmius Regulus =

First century Roman senator, consul, and prefect of Macedonia and Achaea

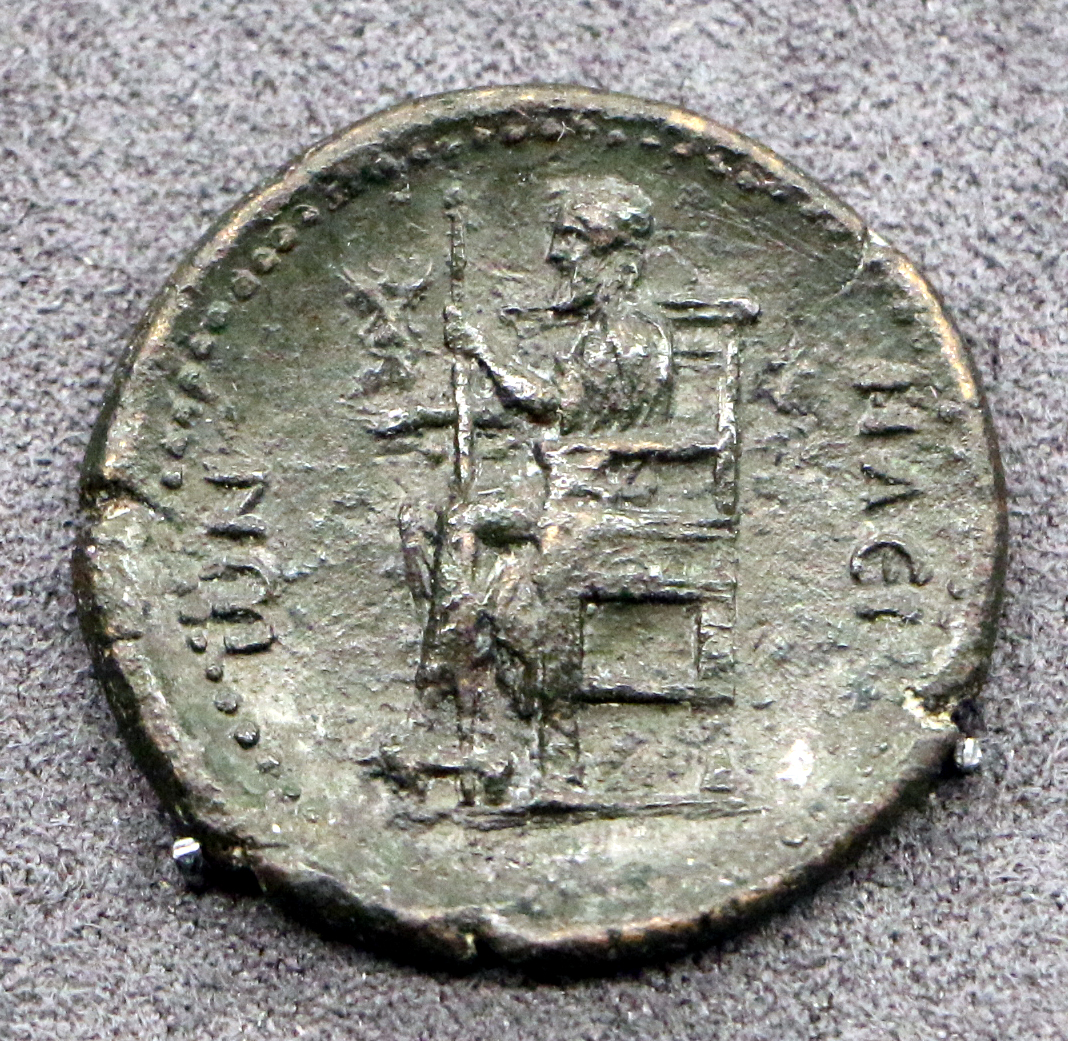
Reverse of a Roman Provincial coin by Hadrian depicting the Statue of Zeus by Phidias, which Caligula ordered Memmius to bring to Rome

Publius Memmius Regulus (died AD 61) was a Roman senator active during the reign of the emperor Tiberius. He served as consul suffectus from October to December AD 31 with Lucius Fulcinius Trio as his colleague, governor of Achaia from AD 35 to 44, and governor of Asia, possibly from AD 48 to 49.

== Background and family ==
His father was also named Publius. He was from the town of Rosceliona in the province of Gallia Narbonensis. Regulus came to the consulate a novus homo, meaning that no member of his family had previously achieved that office; Ronald Syme goes as far as to label Regulus "the first Narbonensian consul, anticipating Valerius Asiaticus in 35 and Domitius Afer in 39". A Gaius Memmius had been consul suffectus in 34 BC, but they were likely unrelated.

Regulus' wife was Lollia Paulina, a woman of great beauty and considerable wealth. Shortly after his accession, Caligula compelled Regulus to divorce Paulina, who in AD 38 became the emperor's third wife. But after six months, the emperor divorced and exiled Paulina. Regulus was probably the father of Gaius Memmius Regulus, consul in AD 63.

== Political career ==
Regulus and his colleague, Trio, entered their consulship on the Kalends of October, AD 31, and served until the end of the year. Their magistracy saw the downfall of Sejanus, the notorious plotter and sycophant of Tiberius, whom Regulus personally conducted to prison.

After his consulship, Regulus served as prefect of the combined provinces of Macedonia and Achaea. He was legatus pro praetore of Achaea from 35 to 44. During his time in Achaea, Regulus and his son were honored with various statues at Epidaurus and elsewhere. Several Greek aristocrats received Roman citizenship from him and therefore assumed the name Memmius, notably Publius Memmius Pratolaus of Sparta. After the death of Tiberius, his successor, Caligula, ordered Regulus to remove the statue of Jupiter by Phidias at Olympia, and bring it to Rome. He was proconsular governor of Asia, possibly for the term 48/49.

Regulus was one of the Sodales Augustales, the Epulones, and the Arval Brethren, all important priesthoods. Tacitus describes him as "a man of dignity, who was a person of influence and good name." Shortly before he died in the year 61, the emperor Nero described him as one of his nation's greatest resources.

== See also ==
- Memmia gens

== Bibliography ==
- Flavius Josephus, Antiquitates Judaïcae (Antiquities of the Jews).
- Publius Cornelius Tacitus, Annales.
- Gaius Suetonius Tranquillus, De Vita Caesarum (Lives of the Caesars, or The Twelve Caesars).
- Pausanias, Description of Greece.
- Lucius Cassius Dio Cocceianus (Cassius Dio), Roman History.
- Eusebius of Caesarea, Chronicon.
- Dictionary of Greek and Roman Biography and Mythology, William Smith, ed., Little, Brown and Company, Boston (1849).
- Alison E. Cooley, The Cambridge Manual of Latin Epigraphy, Cambridge University Press, (2012).
- Melfi, Milena (2007). I santuari di Asclepio in Grecia. Roma: L'Erma di Bretschneider. ISBN 9788882653477.
- Spawforth, A. J. S. (1985). "Families at Roman Sparta and Epidaurus: Some Prosopographical Notes". The Annual of the British School at Athens. 80: 191–258. doi:10.1017/S0068245400007589. ISSN 0068-2454. JSTOR 30102828.

Political offices
Preceded by Faustus Cornelius Sulla Lucullus, and Lucius Fulcinius Trio as Consules suffecti	Consul suffectus of the Roman Empire; 31 with Lucius Fulcinius Trio	Succeeded by Gnaeus Domitius Ahenobarbus, and Lucius Arruntius Camillus Scribonianus as Consules ordinarii
