= Marcus Livineius Regulus =

Suffect consul 18 AD

Marcus Livineius Regulus was a Roman senator, active during the reign of Tiberius. He was suffect consul for February through July of the year 18, succeeding Germanicus as the colleague of Lucius Seius Tubero.

== Background ==
With family origins in Campania, Regulus is described by Ronald Syme as "the first consul and the last of an inconspicuous family." Syme suggests he may be the "Reg(ulus)" attested as praetor peregrinus in 2 BC, noting that "nothing would indicate a youthful consul." In another paper Syme notes that Regulus was tresviri monetalis no later than 9 BC, and adds, "Therefore about fifty when consul."

Regulus appears once in the surviving pages of Tacitus' Annales, as one of three men who, in the year 20, defended Gnaeus Calpurnius Piso on charges related to the death from poison of Germanicus, after three other senators (Lucius Arruntius, Marcus Vinicius, and Asinius Gallus) declined for various reasons. The other two who defended Piso were Marcus Aemilius Lepidus and Lucius Calpurnius Piso. Despite their efforts, and the support of the emperor Tiberius, the case went against Piso and he committed suicide before the Senate could hold a vote on the verdict.

Tactius mentions another Livineius Regulus, whose expulsion from the Senate he had recounted in one of the lost sections of his Annales. This Livineius Regulus had staged a gladiator show at Pompeii in the year 59, where the townspeople of Pompeii attacked a number of inhabitants of the neighboring town of Nuceria. Emperor Nero referred the matter to the Senate, who first tried to hand it off to the consuls, but in the end punished Pompeii with a 10-year ban on similar public gatherings, and having all of their guild associations dissolved. Further, this Regulus was punished with exile, apparently from Italy. While it is doubtful that they are the same person, how Livineius Regulus the consul is related to Livineius Regulus the ex-Senator is uncertain.

Political offices
Preceded by Tiberius III, and Germanicus II as ordinary consuls	Suffect consul of the Roman Empire; 18 with Lucius Seius Tubero	Succeeded by Gaius Rubellius Blandus, and Marcus Vipstanus Gallus as suffect consuls
