= Apronia gens =

Plebeian family of ancient Rome

The gens Apronia was a minor plebeian family of ancient Rome, appearing in history from the early Republic to the first century of the Empire. The first member of this gens to achieve prominence was Gaius Apronius, tribune of the plebs in 449 BC. None of the Apronii obtained the consulship until the first century AD.

== Praenomina ==
The Apronii mentioned in Roman writers used the praenomina Gaius, Gnaeus, Quintus, and Lucius.

== Branches and cognomina ==
The only cognomen associated with the Apronii is Caesianus, which is probably derived from the nomen of the gens Caesia, and may indicate descent from the Caesii through a female line.

== Members ==
This list includes abbreviated praenomina. For an explanation of this practice, see filiation.

- Gaius Apronius, one of the tribunes of the plebs elected in 449 BC, after the fall of the decemvirate.
- Gnaeus Apronius, a man of aedilician rank, whom together with a certain Quintus Fabius of the same rank, was turned over to the people of Apollonia in 266 BC, after having insulted their envoys. Apollonia undertook no punishment, but returned the men unharmed. They must have been aediles no later than 267, with Fabius presumably a curule aedile, and Apronius probably plebeian aedile.
- Quintus Apronius, leader of the decumani, the collectors of the grain tax, in Sicily under Verres, governor of the province from 73 to 71 BC. Cicero decries his extreme greed, and gives several examples of Apronius' proclivity for wickedness.
- Lucius Apronius C. f. C. n., consul suffectus from the Kalends of July in AD 8, was proconsul in Africa in AD 20, and later propraetor in Germania Inferior, where he was slain attempting to quell a revolt of the Frisii.
- Apronia L. f. C. n., one of two daughters of Lucius Apronius, the consul of AD 8, was murdered by her husband, Marcus Plautius Silvanus, praetor in AD 24.
- Apronia L. f. C. n., a daughter of Lucius Apronianus, the consul of AD 8, married Gnaeus Cornelius Lentulus Gaetulicus, consul in AD 26.
- Lucius Apronius L. f. C. n. Caesianus, went to Africa with his father, Lucius Apronus, governor of that province in AD 20. He was consul in AD 39, first with the emperor Gaius, who held the fasces in January, then with Quintus Sanquinius Maximus to the end of June.

== See also ==
- List of Roman gentes

== Bibliography ==
=== Ancient sources ===
- Marcus Tullius Cicero, In Verrem.
- Titus Livius (Livy), History of Rome.
- Publius Cornelius Tacitus, Annales.
- Lucius Cassius Dio, Roman History.

=== Modern sources ===
- T. Robert S. Broughton, The Magistrates of the Roman Republic, American Philological Association (1952–1986).
- Dictionary of Greek and Roman Biography and Mythology, William Smith, ed., Little, Brown and Company, Boston (1849).
- Paul A. Gallivan, "The Fasti for the Reign of Gaius", in Antichthon, vol. 13, pp. 66–69 (1979).
