= Marcus Magius Maximus =

Prefect or governor of Roman Egypt

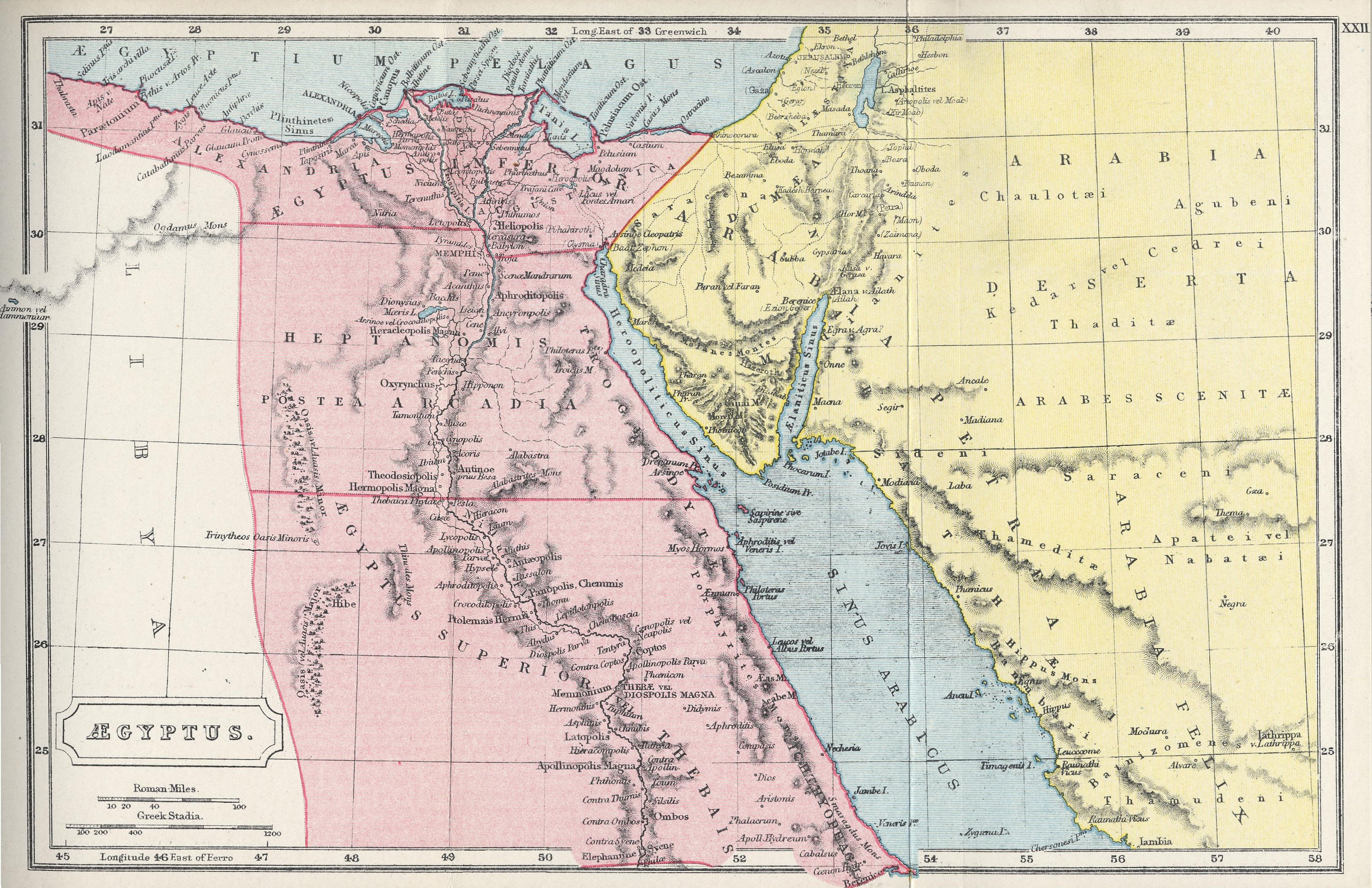

Marcus Magius Maximus was an eques active during the reign of the emperor Augustus. Maximus was prefect of Roman Egypt from AD 12 to 14. It was thought Maximus had been appointed prefect of Egypt twice -- the only person to hold this office twice -- based almost solely on a problematic passage in Philo's In Flaccum, but John Rea has shown this passage can be read more plausibly in a different way, removing all support for this belief.

While prefect of Egypt, Maximus had an obelisk that Ptolemy II Philadelphus had erected as a memorial to his wife and sister Arsinoe II in Alexandria moved to the market-place because it was in the way of the harbor.

An inscription from Aeclanum near Beneventum suggests that Magius Maximus was also procurator of Hispania Tarraconensis. However, H. G. Pflaum has argued that the more usual path from procurator of that province was to that of Syria, which would make Maximus' inferred career unusual.

Political offices
Preceded by Lucius Antonius Pedo	Prefect of Egypt; 12–14	Succeeded by Lucius Seius Strabo
