= Cornelius Lupus =

Roman consul in 42 AD

Cornelius Lupus was a Roman senator active during the Principate. The offices Lupus held included the Proconsul of Creta et Cyrenaica during the reign of Emperor Tiberius, and most significantly the suffect consul for an unknown number of months in AD 42 as the colleague of Gaius Caecina Largus. During the reign of Tiberius, there are also preserved coins that were made under his magistrate in Crete, which was preferred for minting coins as there was a minting imbalance in the region of Crete and Cyrenaica.

Despite being a friend of the emperor Claudius, Lupus was one of the victims of the notorious delator or informer Publius Suillius Rufus, whose prosecution destroyed Lupus.

Political offices
Preceded by Gaius Cestius Gallus as Suffect consul	Suffect consul of the Roman Empire; 42 with Gaius Caecina Largus	Succeeded by Tiberius Claudius Caesar Augustus Germanicus III, and Lucius Vitellius II as Ordinary consuls
