= Sextus Tedius Valerius Catullus =

Sextus Tedius Valerius Catullus was a Roman senator active during the Principate.

== Biography ==
He was suffect consul from May through November AD 31 as the colleague of Faustus Cornelius Sulla Lucullus. As consul he was usually known as Sextus Tedius or Sextus Tedius Valerius; his gentilicium is spelled Teidius in the Fasti Nolani (CIL X, 1233) and the Acta Arvalia.

According to the research of Olli Salomies, Tedius was born "Lucius Valerius Catullus" the son of the homonymous moneyer, and adopted by testament by a senator named Sextus Te(i)dius -- a conclusion that "has, of course, been noted by many scholars." Salomies also states that his son was the Valerius Catullus mentioned as a pontiff in an inscription found at Lanuvium, and who is "almost certainly identical" with the Valerius Catullus mentioned by Suetonius as a homosexual partner of the emperor Caligula (Suetonius 36.3).

== See also ==
- Tedia gens
- Valeria gens

Political offices
Preceded by Tiberius Caesar Augustus V, and Lucius Aelius Seianus as consul ordinarius	Suffect consul of the Roman Empire; 31 with Faustus Cornelius Sulla Lucullus	Succeeded by Faustus Cornelius Sulla Lucullus, and Lucius Fulcinius Trio as consul suffectus
