= Lucius Seius Strabo =

Prefect of the Roman imperial bodyguard, the Praetorian Guard (46 BC-16 AD)

- Born: 46 BC; Volsinii, Etruria
- Died: 16 AD; Roman Egypt, Roman Empire
- Military career
- Allegiance: Roman Empire
- Service years: unknown – 15 AD
- Rank: Praetorian prefect
- Commands: Praetorian Guard
- Other work: Prefect of the province of Egypt in 16

Lucius Seius Strabo (46 BC - after 16 AD) was a prefect of the Roman imperial bodyguard, known as the Praetorian Guard, during the rule of the emperors Augustus and Tiberius. The length of Strabo's tenure as Praetorian prefect is unknown, but he held the position together with various colleagues until 15, after which he was appointed to the governorship of Egypt. With this career Strabo distinguished himself by attaining the two highest offices open to men of the equestrian class in the Roman Empire.

His son was Lucius Aelius Sejanus, who succeeded his father as Praetorian prefect in 15, and gained great influence under Emperor Tiberius before dramatically falling from power in 31.

== Family ==
Lucius Seius Strabo was born around 46 BC in Volsinii, Etruria, to the family of Marcus Seius Strabo and Terentia. Although the Seii were Romans of the equestrian class, Strabo's father maintained relations with senatorial families through his marriage with Terentia. Her brother was Aulus Terentius Varro Murena, who shared the consulship with Augustus in 23 BC, and her sister, a more well known Terentia, was the wife of Augustus' political ally Maecenas.

Strabo himself married into equally illustrious families. His first wife was Aelia, the daughter of Quintus Aelius Tubero, a marriage by which he allied himself with the more prestigious Aelian gens. By Aelia, he had one son, Lucius Seius Tubero, who became suffect consul in 18. After her death, he married Cosconia Gallita, sister of Servius Cornelius Lentulus Maluginensis (suffect consul in 10), Publius Cornelius Lentulus Scipio (suffect consul in 2), and half sister of Quintus Junius Blaesus (suffect consul in 10). With Cosconia Strabo had one son, Lucius Seius, who was later adopted into the Aelian gens and became known as Lucius Aelius Seianus, or simply Sejanus.

== Career ==
=== Under Augustus ===
The equestrian class was one of the two upper social classes of the Roman Republic and the early Roman Empire. Officially, they were the second tier of the elite, behind the patrician or senatorial class. This made them relatively harmless and consequently, suitable for important offices of state such as Praetorian prefect or governor of Egypt; the former post which was in charge of the Emperor's personal bodyguard, the latter which controlled the grain supply of Rome. A senator who occupied such positions might develop ambitions of making himself emperor, a danger Augustus was well aware of.

The Praetorian Guard was formally established under Augustus in 27 BC. During Republican times, generals or statesmen had relied on private corps of soldiers before, but the Guard as established by Augustus differed from these early cohorts, not only in structure and number but also in function. As a special division of the Roman Army, they were essentially loyal to the Emperor and his family only, and accordingly their pay-rate was much higher. Augustus was careful however to uphold the Republican veneer of his regime, and allowed only nine cohorts to be formed, which was one less than in a normal legion. Only three of those were ever kept on active duty. As the Roman citizens grew more used to the presence of soldiers in the capital however, their numbers were increased from 500 to 1000 soldiers per cohort.

Not much is known about the precise activities of the Guard during this period. Their primary function was to safeguard the Emperor and his family, but Augustus seems to have involved the Praetorians as much in tasks of civil administration. Prior to 2 BC the tribunes of the cohorts received their orders directly from Augustus himself. This changed with the appointment of the first Praetorian prefects, only a few of which are known by name. It is generally assumed that, when Lucius Seius Strabo accepted the post, possibly with Publius Varius Ligur, he succeeded Publius Salvius Aper and Quintus Ostorius Scapula.

The date or the reasons of Strabo's appointment are unclear. It is likely however that he came to the attention of Augustus through his mother's connection with Maecenas. A passage of Macrobius suggests the two might have even been friends. Whatever the case, Strabo faithfully served as prefect until the Emperor's death in 14.

=== Under Tiberius ===
When Tiberius acceded to the supreme power upon the death of Augustus, one of his first acts was to secure the loyalty of the Praetorian Guard. The ancient historian Tacitus describes this event in his work The Annals:

Sextus Pompeius and Sextus Apuleius, the consuls, were the first to swear allegiance to Tiberius Caesar, and in their presence the oath was taken by Seius Strabo and Caius Turranius, respectively the commander of the praetorian cohorts and the superintendent of the corn supplies. Then the Senate, the soldiers and the people did the same.

The order in which this occurred—the senate after the two prefects—indicates the significance that by now was attached to the office of Praetorian prefect as head of the Emperor's personal guard. Strabo would not remain prefect for much longer however, but for his services to the house of Augustus he was well rewarded by Tiberius. He took up a position in the emperor's consilium, and the same year gained his own son, Lucius Aelius Sejanus, as colleague in his prefecture. Together they commanded the Praetorian Guard from 14 until 15 or 16, after which Strabo was promoted to the highest office a Roman knight could attain, governor of Egypt. The length of his governorship is unclear, nor what happened to Strabo after this appointment, but it has been suggested that he died while in office.

Although Strabo distinguished himself by achieving the highest offices a Roman knight could attain under Augustus and Tiberius, his place in history has been largely overshadowed by the infamy of his son Sejanus. During a prefecture which lasted nearly 17 years, Sejanus introduced reforms to the Praetorians which helped shape the Guard into an integral and powerful branch of the Principate. The soldiers were gathered to a single garrison and the number of cohorts was increased from 9 to 12. Sejanus himself became a trusted advisor to Tiberius, and during the latter's withdrawal to Capri in 26 was effectually the ruler of the Roman Empire until 31. That year he suddenly fell from power amidst suspicions of Tiberius that Sejanus was secretly plotting against him. He was executed along with his three children.

== Notes ==
Political offices
Preceded by Publius Salvius Aper and Quintus Ostorius Scapula	Praetorian prefect with Varius Ligur ???-15	Succeeded by Lucius Aelius Sejanus
Preceded by Marcus Magius Maximus	Prefect of Egypt; 14 – 15 BC	Succeeded by Aemilius Rectus
