= Seia gens =

Ancient Roman family

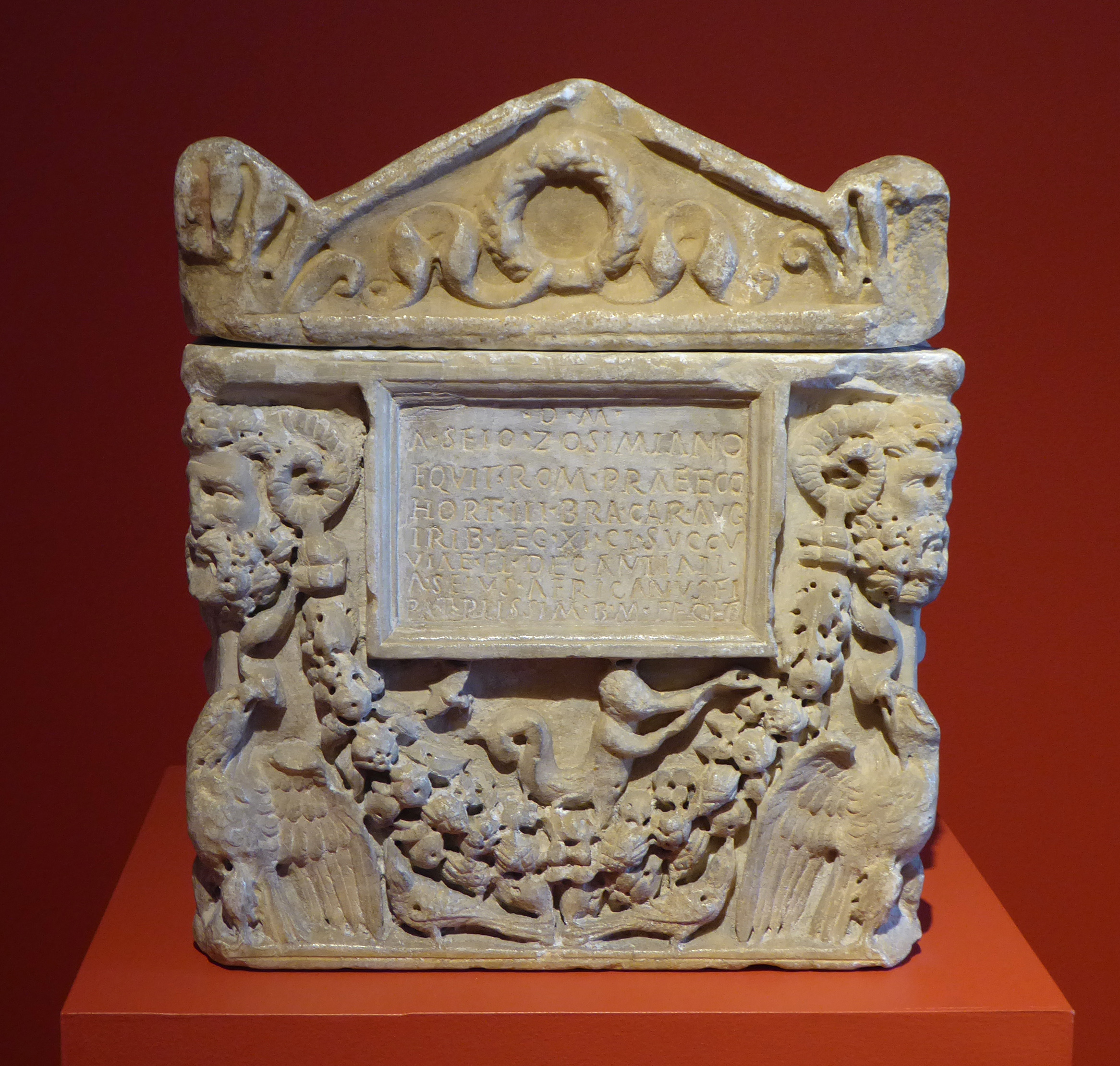
Cinerary urn of Aulus Seius Zosimianus, from Rome, second century

The gens Seia was a minor plebeian family of equestrian rank at ancient Rome. Members of this gens are first mentioned in the time of Cicero, and a few of them held various magistracies under the late Republic and into imperial times.

== Origin ==
The nomen Seius is derived from the name of Seia, the goddess of sowing. Chase classifies it among those gentilicia that either originated at Rome, or cannot be shown to have come from anywhere else.

== Praenomina ==
The main praenomina of the Seii were Lucius and Marcus, two of the most common names throughout Roman history. Other common names were occasionally used, including Gnaeus, Publius, and Quintus.

== Members ==
This list includes abbreviated praenomina. For an explanation of this practice, see filiation.

- Marcus Seius L. f., a friend of Cicero, who despite having been heavily fined early in his career, spent lavishly as curule aedile. He was the accuser of Marcus Saufeius, whom Cicero defended on the charge that he had participated in the murder of Publius Clodius Pulcher. It is highly likely he was the father of Lucius Seius Strabo, and thus the grandfather of the infamous Sejanus.
- Quintus Seius Postumus, an eques, whose house Publius Clodius Pulcher coveted. Seius refused Clodius' offer, and according to Cicero, was poisoned by Clodius as a result.
- Marcus Seius (M. f. L. n.), a friend of Decimus Brutus, under whom he served as legate in 44 BC.
- Seius, (Note: Probably the same person as the Viseius mentioned in the thirteenth Philippic.) one of the partisans of Marcus Antonius, whom Cicero harangues in his Philippics.
- Gnaeus Seius, the first owner of the infamous equus Seianus, a greatly-admired beast who supposedly brought doom to all who possessed him, giving rise to the proverb, ille homo habet equum Seianum, (Note: "That man holds the Seian horse.") said of those suffering ill fortune.
- Lucius Seius, proconsul of Sicily between 27 and 23 BC.
- Lucius Seius M. f. Strabo, an eques, who rose to the rank of praetorian prefect under Augustus. Tiberius appointed him governor of Egypt, and he was succeeded by his son, Sejanus.
- Lucius Seius L. f. M. n. Tubero, the brother or half-brother of Sejanus, was appointed consul suffectus in AD 18, in the place of Tiberius. He served alongside Germanicus, whose legate he had been during his campaign in Germania. In 24, he was falsely accused of majestas, impugning the emperor's dignity. He might be the same Lucius Seius who was proconsul of Sicily.
- Lucius Seius L. f. M. n., better known as Lucius Aelius Sejanus, praetorian prefect under Tiberius, gained the emperor's trust and became his closest advisor, exploiting rivalries within the imperial household to his own benefit, and maneuvering himself into a position to succeed to the empire. His schemes were revealed, and he was condemned and put to death during his own consulship, in AD 31.
- Seius Quadratus, implicated as one of the associates of Sejanus, following the latter's downfall.
- Lucius Seius Quadratus, perhaps the associate of Sejanus, was one of the Seviri Augustales, according to an inscription dating to the first half of the first century AD.
- Marcus Seius Varanus, consul suffectus in AD 41, holding office for the months of September and October.
- Lucius Seius Avitus, governor of Mauretania Tingitana from AD 114 to 116.
- Gaius Seius M. f. Calpurnius Quadratus Sittianus, perhaps a descendant of the Seius Quadratus who was implicated in the schemes of Sejanus, was tribune of the plebs, quaestor, praetor peregrinus, and governor of Gallia Narbonensis.
- Decimus Seius Seneca, consul suffectus around AD 150
- Publius Seius Fuscianus, consul suffectus about AD 151, was a close friend of Marcus Aurelius, whom he had known since childhood. Fuscianus was praefectus urbi from 187 to 189, and consul ordinarius in 188.
- Seius Superstes, curator operum locorumque publicorum," caretaker of public buildings, in AD 193.
- Seia M. f. Gaetula, the wife of Marcus Naevius Censitus, mother of Naevia Marciana, Naevia Naevilla, and Marcus Naevius Sejanus, and grandmother of Sabinia Celsina, was buried at Cirta in Numidia.
- Seius P. n. Carus, the grandson of Fuscianus, was put to death by Elagabalus in AD 219, allegedly for plotting a revolt among the soldiers, but in fact because of his wealth and influence.
- Seia P. n. Fuscinilla, the sister of Seius Carus, named on a lead pipe discovered at Rome.
- Lucius Seius Herennius Sallustius, an esteemed nobleman in the time of Severus Alexander, who married Sallustius' daughter. Sallustius sought the protection of the Praetorian Guard against the abuse of Julia Mamaea, the emperor's mother, who cruelly treated her daughter-in-law; accusing him of treason, Julia had him put to death.
- Gnaea Seia L. f. Herennia Sallustia Barbia Orbiana, one of the wives of Severus Alexander, and Roman empress for about two years before her father's downfall, after which she was divorced and exiled to Libya.

== See also ==
- List of Roman gentes

== Bibliography ==
- Marcus Tullius Cicero, De Domo Sua, De Haruspicum Responsis, De Officiis, Epistulae ad Atticum, Epistulae ad Familiares, Philippicae, Pro Plancio.
- Marcus Terentius Varro, Rerum Rusticarum (Rural Matters).
- Marcus Velleius Paterculus, Compendium of Roman History.
- Lucius Annaeus Seneca (Seneca the Younger), De Consolatione ad Marciam (To Marcia, on Consolation), De Tranquillitate Animi (On Peace of Mind).
- Quintus Asconius Pedianus, Commentarius in Oratio Ciceronis Pro Milone (Commentary on Cicero's Oration Pro Milone).
- Gaius Plinius Secundus (Pliny the Elder), Historia Naturalis (Natural History).
- Publius Cornelius Tacitus, Annales.
- Gaius Suetonius Tranquillus, De Vita Caesarum (Lives of the Caesars, or The Twelve Caesars).
- Aulus Gellius, Noctes Atticae (Attic Nights).
- Lucius Cassius Dio Cocceianus (Cassius Dio), Roman History.
- Herodianus, Tes Meta Marcon Basileas Istoria (History of the Empire from the Death of Marcus Aurelius).
- Joannes Zonaras, Epitome Historiarum (Epitome of History), Thomas Banchich, Eugene Lane, eds., Routledge (2009).
- Dictionary of Greek and Roman Biography and Mythology, William Smith, ed., Little, Brown and Company, Boston (1849).
- George Davis Chase, "The Origin of Roman Praenomina", in Harvard Studies in Classical Philology, vol. VIII, pp. 103–184 (1897).
- Paul von Rohden, Elimar Klebs, & Hermann Dessau, Prosopographia Imperii Romani (The Prosopography of the Roman Empire, abbreviated PIR), Berlin (1898).
- T. Robert S. Broughton, The Magistrates of the Roman Republic, American Philological Association (1952–1986).
- Géza Alföldy, Konsulat und Senatorenstand unter der Antonien (The Consulate and Senatorial State under the Antonines), Rudolf Habelt, Bonn (1977).
- Giovanni Lettich, Iscrizioni romane di Iulia Concordia (Roman Inscriptions from Julia Concordia), Centro Studi Storico-Religiosi del Friuli-Venezia Giulia, Trieste (1994).
- J.E.H. Spaul, "Governors of Tingitana", in Antiquités Africaines, vol. 30 (1994).
