= Lucius Seius Tubero =

Roman senator who flourished under the reign of Tiberius

Lucius Seius Tubero was a Roman senator, who flourished under the reign of Tiberius. He was suffect consul for February through July of the year 18, succeeding the emperor Tiberius, and as the colleague first of Germanicus, then of Marcus Livineius Regulus.

The family connections of Seius Tubero have posed a problem for students of ancient history. For example, he is the only consul of either the Roman Republic or Empire to use "Tubero" as a cognomen who was not of the gens Aelia. The consensus is that Tubero is one of the two brothers of Sejanus alluded to by Velleius Paterculus; however, theories defining this fraternal relationship have changed over the years. Bartolomeo Borghesi first proposed that Seius Tubero was the son of Lucius Seius Strabo. Then it was proposed that Seius Tubero was by birth the nephew of Strabo's wife, whom Strabo later adopted. The latest theory of his fraternal relationship to Sejanus, proposed by Ronald Syme, is that Seius Tubero was the son of his wife Junia with her first husband, the jurist Quintus Aelius Tubero, whom Seius Strabo adopted following his marriage to Junia.

Seius Tubero's first recorded action is in the year 16, as the commander of the cavalry under Germanicus in the battle against the Angrivarii. He next appears after his consulship, in the year 24, when he and Gnaeus Cornelius Lentulus Augur, described by Tacitus as leading men of the state and close friends of emperor Tiberius, were accused by Vibius Serenus of inciting rebellion and public unrest. Because Lentulus was so old and Tubero in poor health, both were acquitted, and Serenus fled from Rome for Ravenna, only to be brought back before the Senate, tried, and punished with exile.

His life after that incident is a blank. As Tacitus notes that Gnaeus Cornelius Lentulus Gaetulicus was "alone of all connected with Sejanus" to avoid death or exile after his fall in the year 31, it is likely that Seius Tubero died either before Sejanus' fall, or soon after it.

Political offices
Preceded by Tiberius III; Germanicus II as ordinary consuls	Roman consul 18 (suffect) with Marcus Livineius Regulus	Succeeded by Gaius Rubellius Blandus; Marcus Vipstanus Gallus as suffect consuls
