= Faustus Cornelius Sulla (consul 31) =

1st century AD Roman senator

Faustus Cornelius Sulla was a Roman senator who lived during the reign of the emperor Tiberius. He was suffect consul in AD 31 with Sextus Tedius Valerius Catullus as his colleague. Faustus was the son of Sulla Felix, a member of the Arval Brethren who died in AD 21, thus a direct descendant of the dictator Sulla. His mother was Sextia and his brother was Lucius Cornelius Sulla Felix.

In 21, Faustus married Domitia Lepida the Younger. She was a child of Antonia the Elder by Lucius Domitius Ahenobarbus (consul 16 BC), a great niece of Emperor Augustus and a granddaughter to Octavia and Triumvir Mark Antony. Lepida had two children from her previous marriage to Marcus Valerius Messalla Barbatus: Marcus Valerius Messalla Corvinus, and the Empress Messalina, third wife of the Emperor Claudius.

Domitia Lepida bore Faustus a son Faustus Cornelius Sulla Felix (22-62), who later married Claudia Antonia, a daughter of Claudius. Faustus died of uncertain causes around 40.

Political offices
Preceded by Tiberius Caesar Augustus V Lucius Aelius Seianus	Roman suffect consul 31 with Sex. Tedius Valerius Catullus; Lucius Fulcinius Trio	Succeeded by Publius Memmius Regulus as suffectus
