= Ostoria gens =

Roman plebeian family

The gens Ostoria, occasionally written Hostoria, was a plebeian family at Rome. Members of this gens are first mentioned in the early years of the Empire. Although only a few of them achieved any prominence in the Roman state, many others are known from inscriptions. The most illustrious of the Ostorii was probably Publius Ostorius Scapula, who was consul during the reign of Claudius, and afterward governor of Britain.

== Praenomina ==
The main praenomina of the Ostorii were Quintus, Publius, Marcus, Gaius, and Lucius, which were the five most common names throughout Roman history. Only the first three are known from the family of the Ostorii Scapulae.

== Branches and cognomina ==
The cognomina of the Ostorii occurring in ancient historians were Sabinus and Scapula. Sabinus refers to a Sabine, and typically indicates that the bearer was of Sabine ancestry. Scapula, literally "shoulder-blade", was probably given to someone with prominent shoulders. The Scapulae were the only important family of the Ostorii, holding four consulships over the course of the first century.

== Members ==
This list includes abbreviated praenomina. For an explanation of this practice, see filiation.

=== Ostorii Scapulae ===
- Quintus Ostorius Scapula, appointed by Augustus one of the first two prefects of the Praetorian Guard, in AD 2.
- Publius Ostorius Scapula, governor of Egypt during the latter part of the reign of Augustus, attested from AD 3 to 10 or 11. He was probably the brother of the praetorian prefect, and father of Publius and Quintus, consuls during the reign of Claudius.
- Quintus Ostorius (P. f.) Scapula, consul suffectus in AD 41. (Note: This is the most probable date; from inscriptions we know that he was the colleague of Gaius Suillius Rufus; Christol and Demougin have concluded that he was consul under Tiberius or Caligula.) He was probably the son of the governor of Egypt, but perhaps of the praetorian prefect.
- Publius Ostorius (P. f.) Scapula, consul suffectus circa AD 45, became governor of Britain the following year. He fought successfully against a number of British tribes, defeating the Silures, and being granted the insignia of a Roman triumph. He died before leaving office.
- Marcus Ostorius P. f. Scapula, served in his father's army in Britain, and was commended for his bravery. He was consul suffectus ex kal. Juliis in AD 59. In the reign of Nero, he refused to support the accusation of maligning the emperor raised against Antistius Sosianus, but in AD 66, Sosianus accused him of conspiring against Nero. He took his own life before he could be murdered on the emperor's orders.
- Marcus Ostorius Scapula, (Note: Scrapula in the inscription.) consul in AD 99, and proconsul of Asia from 114 to 115.

=== Others ===
- Ostoria, daughter of Ostorius Euhodus and Caprilia Cassia, buried at Rome, aged fifteen years and fifteen days.
- Ostoria, mother of Ostoria and Gaius Ostorius Capitonius, buried at Capena in Etruria.
- Ostoria, daughter of Ostoria and sister of Gaius Ostorius Capitonius.
- Ostoria, buried at Rome.
- Ostoria S. f. Quarta, the mother of Calpurnia Ostoria Pia, buried at Anagnia during the late first or early second century.
- Ostorius, a man of consular rank, was probably legate of Cilicia during the reign of Severus Alexander.
- Hostorius, a freedman buried in the sepulchre of Lucius Ostorius Felix.
- Marcus Ostorius, named in an inscription from Pompeii.
- Marcus Ostorius, mentioned in a funerary inscription from Capua.
- Publius Hostorius, dedicated a monument at Rome to his children, Publius Hostorius and Hostoria Helena.
- Publius Hostorius P. f., brother of Hostoria Helena, buried at Rome.
- Publius Ostorius, a boxer named in a list of gladiators found at Pompeii.
- Quintus Ostirius, named in an inscription from Rome.
- Spurius Ostorius, the father of Ostoria Quarta.
- Ostorius Amandus, buried at Ostia.
- Ostoria P. l. Amma, freedwoman of Publius Ostorius Scapula, buried at Rome.
- Gaius Ostorius C. l. Anthimus, freedman of Gaius Ostorius Italus, buried at Puteoli in Campania.
- Ostorius Aprilis, dedicated a monument at the present site of Settecamini in Rome, to his son, Gnaeus Fresidius Marsus, who had been quaestor. The tomb dates to the second century.
- Gaius Ostorius Athenio, a chorales (Note: A flute-player who accompanied a vocal chorus.) buried at Carthage.
- Ostoria Autodice, named in an inscription from Rome.
- Ostoria Auxinis, a freedwoman, and the wife of Publius Octavius Chryseros, buried at Rome.
- Gaius Ostorius Capitonius, son of Ostoria, and brother of Ostoria.
- Ostoria Chelido, wife of the senator Ostorius Euhodianus, buried at Rome. Her monument dates to the late third or early fourth century.
- Ostorius Crysis, a freedwoman, buried in the sepulchre of Lucius Ostorius Felix.
- Ostoria Dia, a freedwoman, and the wife of Gaius Julius Faustus, named in an inscription from Puteoli.
- Lucius Ostorius Dionysius, named in an inscription from Narona in Dalmatia.
- Publius Ostorius P. f. Dorus, son of Publius Ostorius Telesphorus, buried at Rome, aged five.
- Ostoria Dynamis, the mother of Publius Ostorius Ingenuus, buried at Rome.
- Quintus Ostorius Epagathus, named in an inscription from Rome.
- Quintus Hostorius Evangelus, husband of Marcia, buried at Rome.
- Ostorius Eugraphianus, a youth buried at Novaria in Cisalpine Gaul.
- Ostorius Euhodianus, a senator, and consul designate during the late third or early fourth century, dedicated a monument at Rome to his wife, Ostoria Chelido.
- Ostorius Euhodus, husband of Caprilia Cassia, who dedicated a monument at Rome to their daughter, Ostoria.
- Ostorius Euhodus, buried at Portus.
- Ostoria Eutychia, wife of Gaius Julius Similis, buried at Rome.
- Ostoria Felicitas Erindinis, a child buried at Corfinium in Samnium, aged one year, ten months. Her caretakers, Aulus Vercius Auxilaris and Adauta, dedicated a monument to her.
- Ostorius Felix, husband of Claudia Procula, buried at Rome.
- Lucius Ostorius Felix, husband of Seppia Pyrallis, and patron of Lucius Ostorius Fortunatus, buried at Rome.
- Ostoria Fortunata, buried at Portus in Latium.
- Ostorius Fortunatianus, one of the magistri quinquennales of the collegium fabrum (Note: The collegium fabrum was the carpenters' guild at Rome; its officers were known as quinquennales because they were elected every five years. There seem to have been sixty of them at the time of this inscription, although only the names of numbers twenty-four through sixty are preserved. Ostorius was number thirty-one.) at Rome, during the reign of Maxentius.
- Lucius Ostorius Fortunatus, dedicated a monument to his patron, Lucius Ostorius Felix, and his family.
- Gaius Ostorius Galata, one of the soldiers stationed at Rome in AD 70. His commander was the centurion Gnaeus Pompeius Pelas.
- Hostoria P. f. Helena, sister of Publius Hostorius, buried at Rome.
- Gaius Hostorius Helenus, buried at Rome, with a monument dedicated by Gaius Hostorius Ingenuus.
- Gaius Hostorius Ingenuus, dedicated a monument at Rome to Gaius Hostorius Helenus.
- Publius Ostorius Ingenuus, dedicated a monument at Rome to his mother, Ostoria Dynamis.
- Gaius Ostorius Italus, dedicated a monument at Puteoli to his freedman, Gaius Ostorius Anthimus.
- Gaius Ostorius Italus, made a gift to the shrine of Diana at Tibur.
- Ostorius Januarius, a freedman buried in the sepulchre of Lucius Ostorius Felix.
- Quintus Ostorius Q. f. Licinianus, a child buried at Rome, aged nine years, three months.
- Marcus Ostorius Marcianus, dedicated a monument at Salinae in the province of Alpes Maritimae to his son, Valerius Frontinianus.
- Ostoria Minatia, dedicated a monument at Carthage to her husband, Servius Icundus Cretasius, one of the municipal officials at Corfinium.
- Ostoria Nike, (Note: Spelled Nice in the inscription; originally written Ne-, with the 'e' cancelled.) dedicated a monument at Rome to her patron, Gaius Ostorius Successus.
- Lucius Ostorius Nice[...], listed among the men of Ostia who donated the sum of ten thousand sestertii to the emperor Septimius Severus in AD 193.
- Quintus Ostorius Q. f. Ostorianus, a youth buried at Portus.
- Ostoria Paezusa, concubine of Gaius Volusius Inventus, to whom she and her sons, Gaius Volusius Sabinianus and Gaius Volusius Fructus, dedicated a monument at Rome.
- Gaius Ostorius Peregrinus, son of Julia Edone, buried at Rome, aged thirty-five.
- Publius Ostorius P. l. Pharnaces, freedman of Publius Ostorius Scapula, buried at Rome.
- Ostoria Pia, mother of Gaius Ostorius Pius, buried at Rome.
- Gaius Ostorius Pius, son of Ostoria Pia, and husband of Hisonia Nike, dedicated a monument at Rome to his mother and his wife.
- Quintus Ostorius Primitivus, buried at Rome.
- Ostoria Procula, dedicated a monument to her husband, Publius Aelius Felix, a freedman of the emperor Hadrian.
- Ostorius Sabinus, an eques who was richly rewarded by Nero for betraying Barea Soranus and his daughter in AD 66, receiving twelve hundred thousand sestertii and the insignia of a Roman quaestor.
- Ostoria C. f. Satria Eubulis, foster daughter of Titus Flavius Vitalis, married Decimus Fonteius Messallinus, and was the mother of Fonteia. She was buried at Rome, aged twenty-eight years, eight months, and nine days. Her monument dates from the first century.
- Lucius Ostorius Secundus, buried at Torcello in the province of Venetia and Histria.
- Ostoria Sexta, named in a funerary inscription from Dalmatia.
- Ostoria Successa, the wife of Titus Flavius Ampliatus, was a priestess from Bubastis, buried at Rome.
- Gaius Ostorius Successus, patron of Ostoria Nike, buried at Rome.
- Publius Ostorius Telesphorus, dedicated a monument to his son, Publius Ostorius Dorus, at Rome.
- Gaius Ostorius Terpons, husband of Julia, buried at Rome.
- Quintus Ostorius Thia[...], named in a funerary inscription from Rome.
- Gaius Ostorius Tranquillianus, named in a military diploma from Pelovo in Moesia Inferior, dating from AD 153, as well as some inscriptions, the origin of which is uncertain.
- Quintus Ostorius Valerius, listed among the sacerdotes Augustales at Rome.
- Ostoria Varilla, concubine of Acidus, buried at Rome.
- Publius Ostorius Vitalio, son of Ostoria Vitalis, one of the Seviri Augustales at Marruvium in Samnium, where he was buried, aged twenty-three.
- Ostoria Vitalis, dedicated a monument at Marruvium to her son, Publius Ostorius Vitalio.
- Marcus Ostorius Zithis, husband of Claudia Erotis, buried at Rome.

== See also ==
- List of Roman gentes

== Bibliography ==
- Publius Cornelius Tacitus, Annales, De Vita et Moribus Iulii Agricolae (On the Life and Mores of Julius Agricola).
- Lucius Cassius Dio Cocceianus (Cassius Dio), Roman History.
- Dictionary of Greek and Roman Biography and Mythology, William Smith, ed., Little, Brown and Company, Boston (1849).
- Theodor Mommsen et alii, Corpus Inscriptionum Latinarum (The Body of Latin Inscriptions, abbreviated CIL), Berlin-Brandenburgische Akademie der Wissenschaften (1853–present).
- Giovanni Battista de Rossi, Inscriptiones Christianae Urbis Romanae Septimo Saeculo Antiquiores (Christian Inscriptions from Rome of the First Seven Centuries, abbreviated ICUR), Vatican Library, Rome (1857–1861, 1888).
- Notizie degli Scavi di Antichità (News of Excavations from Antiquity, abbreviated NSA), Accademia dei Lincei (1876–present).
- René Cagnat et alii, L'Année épigraphique (The Year in Epigraphy, abbreviated AE), Presses Universitaires de France (1888–present).
- George Davis Chase, "The Origin of Roman Praenomina", in Harvard Studies in Classical Philology, vol. VIII (1897).
- Paul von Rohden, Elimar Klebs, & Hermann Dessau, Prosopographia Imperii Romani (The Prosopography of the Roman Empire, abbreviated PIR), Berlin (1898).
- Hilding Thylander, Inscriptions du port d'Ostie (Inscriptions from the Port of Ostia, abbreviated IPOstie), Acta Instituti Romani Regni Sueciae, Lund (1952).
- Mnemosyne (1969).
- Mireille Cébeillac, "Quelques inscriptions inédites d'Ostie" (Some Unedited Inscriptions from Ostia, abbreviated IIOstie), in Mélanges d'Archéologie et d'Histoire de l'École Française de Rome, vol. 83, pp. 39–125 (1971).
- Margaret M. Roxan and Paul A. Holder, Roman Military Diplomas (abbreviated RMD), London (1978–present).
- Michel Christol and S. Demougin, "Notes de prosopographie équestre", in Zeitschrift für Papyrologie und Epigraphik, vol. 57, pp. 171–178 (1984).
- Anthony R. Birley, The Roman Government of Britain, Oxford University Press (2005).
- Werner Eck, "Die Konsulnlisten in den Fasti Ostienses: Ergänzte und neue Namen", in Codex: Giornale romanistico di studi giuridici, politici e sociali, vol. v, pp. 105–125 (2024).
