= Sejanus =

Roman soldier and confidant of the Roman Emperor Tiberius (20 BC – AD 31)

Lucius Aelius Sejanus
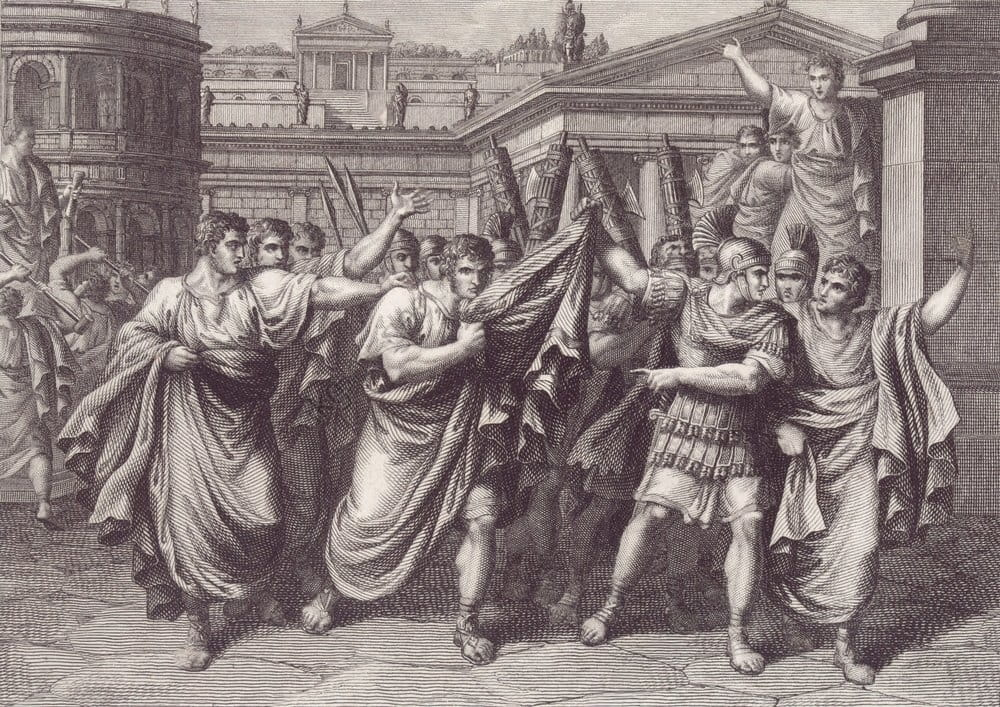
- Sejanus is arrested, an etching by G. Mochetti after drawing by Bartolomeo Pinelli
- Born: c. 20 BC; Volsinii, Etruria
- Died: 18 October AD 31 (aged 50); Rome
- Military career
- Allegiance: Roman Empire
- Service years: AD 14–31
- Rank: Praetorian prefect
- Commands: Praetorian Guard
- Other work: Consul of the Roman Empire in 31

Lucius Aelius Sejanus (/sɪˈdʒeɪnəs/; c. 20 BC – 18 October AD 31) was a Roman soldier and confidant of the Roman Emperor Tiberius. Of the Equites class by birth, Sejanus rose to power as prefect of the Praetorian Guard, the imperial bodyguard, of which he was commander from AD 14 until his execution for treason in AD 31.

While the Praetorian Guard was formally established under Emperor Augustus, Sejanus introduced a number of reforms which saw the unit evolve beyond a mere bodyguard into a powerful and influential branch of the government involved in public security, civil administration and ultimately political intercession; these changes had a lasting impact on the course of the Principate.

During the 20s, Sejanus gradually accumulated power by consolidating his influence over Tiberius and eliminating potential political opponents, including the emperor's son Drusus Julius Caesar. When Tiberius withdrew to Capri in AD 26, Sejanus was left in control of the administration of the empire. For a time the most influential and feared citizen of Rome, Sejanus suddenly fell from power in AD 31, the year his career culminated with the consulship. Amidst suspicions of conspiracy against Tiberius, Sejanus was arrested and executed, along with his followers.

== Family ==
Sejanus was born around 20 BC at Volsinii, Etruria, into the Seia gens. His father was Lucius Seius Strabo. The Seii were Romans of the Equites class (or knights), the second-highest social class of the Roman Republic and the early Roman Empire. Sejanus's grandfather maintained relations with senatorial families through his marriage with Terentia, a sister of the wife of Gaius Maecenas, who was one of Emperor Augustus' most powerful political allies.

Strabo married into equally illustrious families. One of his wives was Cosconia Gallita, sister of Servius Cornelius Lentulus Maluginensis (suffect consul in AD 10) and Publius Cornelius Lentulus Scipio (suffect consul in AD 2). Sejanus was once thought to have possibly been a child of this marriage, but Ronald Syme has argued that Sejanus's mother was Junia Blaesa, sister of Junius Blaesus.

Sejanus's brother Lucius Seius Tubero, who became suffect consul in AD 18, was thought to have been a paternal half-brother, from his father Strabo marrying a daughter of Quintus Aelius Tubero but Syme has rejected this, instead he believes that Lucius Seius Tubero was Junia Blaesa's son from a marriage to Quintus Aelius Tubero whom Strabo adopted upon marrying Junia.

Sejanus was later adopted into the Aelia gens, possibly by Gaius Aelius Gallus the prefect, or Sextus Aelius Catus his half-brother's half-brother, and by Roman custom became known as Lucius Aelius Seianus or simply as Seianus.

The adoptive family of Sejanus counted two consuls among their ranks: Quintus Aelius Tubero (consul in 11 BC) and Sextus Aelius Catus (consul in AD 4), who was the father of Aelia Paetina, the second wife of the future Emperor Claudius. Sejanus's uncle, Junius Blaesus, distinguished himself as a military commander; he became proconsul of Africa in AD 21 and earned triumphal honors by crushing the rebellion of Tacfarinas.

According to the ancient historian Tacitus, Sejanus was also a former favourite of the wealthy Marcus Gavius Apicius, whose daughter may have been Sejanus's first wife Apicata. With Apicata, Sejanus had two sons, Strabo and Capito Aelianus, and a daughter, Junilla.

== Rise to power ==
=== Praetorian prefect ===
It is likely that Sejanus's father Strabo came to the attention of Augustus through his father's connection with Maecenas. Sometime after 2 BC, Strabo was appointed prefect of the Praetorian Guard, one of the two most powerful positions a Roman knight could attain in the Empire. This office he carried on dutifully and without incident until the death of Augustus in AD 14. Little is known about the life Sejanus led prior to this date, but according to Tacitus, he accompanied Gaius Caesar, adopted son of Augustus, during his campaigns in Armenia in 1 BC. Upon the accession of Tiberius in AD 14, Sejanus was appointed prefect of the Praetorian Guard as the colleague of his father Strabo, and began his rise to prominence.

The Praetorian Guard was an elite unit of the Roman army formed by Augustus in 27 BC, with the specific function to serve as a bodyguard to the emperor and members of the imperial family. Much more than a guard however, the Praetorians also managed the day-to-day care of the city, such as general security and civil administration. Furthermore, their presence served as a constant reminder to the people and the Senate of the substantial armed force which served as the basis for the imperial power. Augustus was careful however to uphold the republican veneer of this regime, and only allowed nine cohorts to be formed (one fewer than in a normal Roman legion), which were inconspicuously scattered across various lodging houses in the city, and commanded by two prefects.

When Strabo was assigned to the governorship of Egypt in AD 15, Sejanus became the sole commander of the Praetorians and instigated reforms that helped shape the guard into a powerful tool of the principate. In AD 20 the scattered encampments inside the city were centralized into a single garrison just outside Rome and the number of cohorts was increased from nine to twelve, one of which now held the daily guard at the palace. The practice of joint leadership between two prefects was abandoned, and Sejanus himself appointed the centurions and tribunes. With these changes in effect, Sejanus now commanded the complete loyalty of a force of around 12,000 soldiers, all of which were at his immediate disposal. The facade of Augustus was no longer maintained, and Tiberius openly displayed the strength of the guard at parades.

=== Feud with Drusus ===
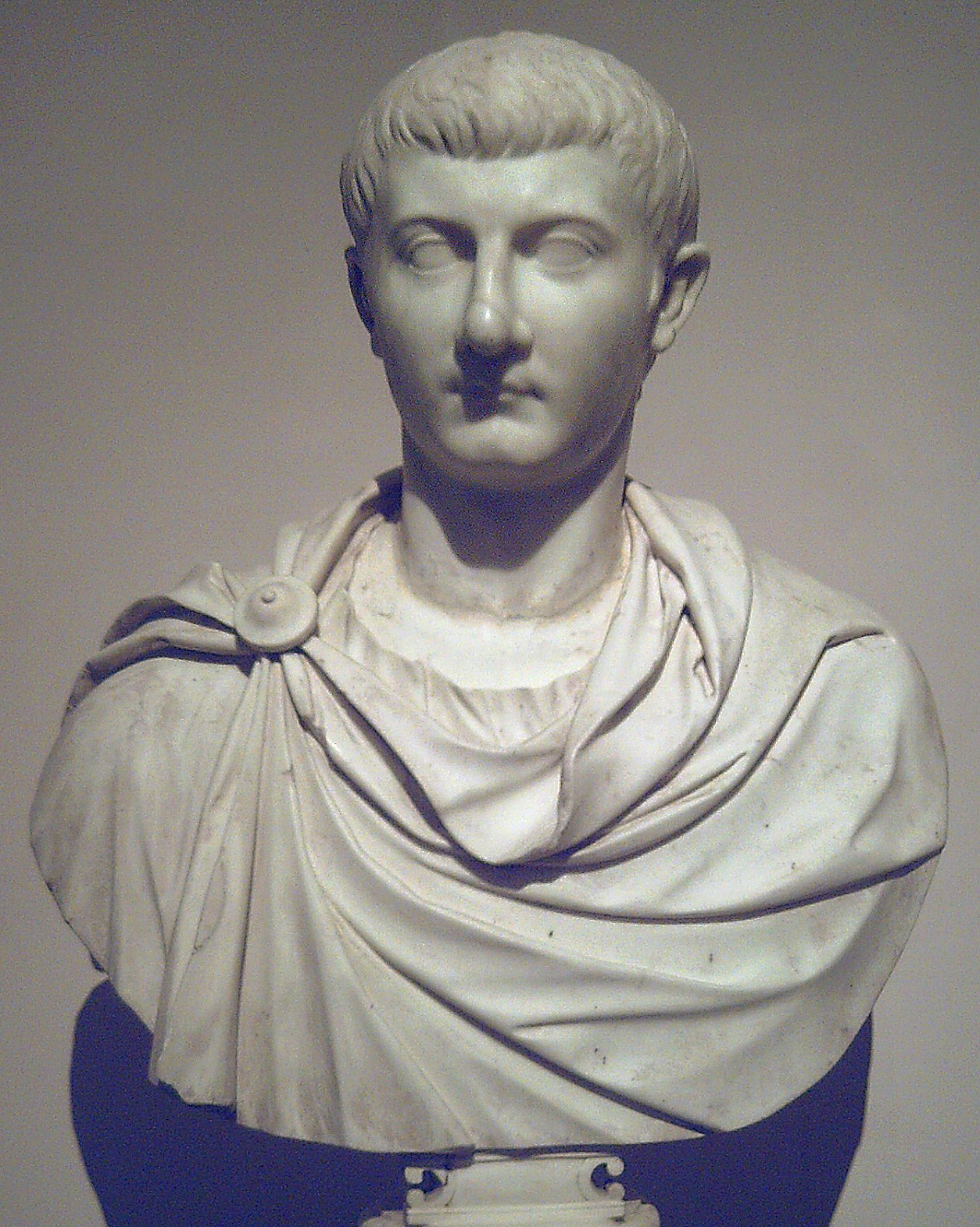
Bust of Drusus the Younger (Drusus Julius Caesar), son of Tiberius. In a conspiracy that involved his own wife Livilla, Drusus was poisoned in AD 23 by agents of Sejanus.

In his capacity as Praetorian prefect, Sejanus quickly became a trusted advisor to Tiberius. By AD 23, he exerted a considerable influence over the decisions of the emperor, who referred to Sejanus as "Socius Laborum" (my partner in my toils). By this time, he had been raised to the rank of praetor, a position not normally granted to Romans of the equestrian class. A statue had been erected in his honor in the Theatre of Pompey and in the Senate his followers were advanced to public offices and governorships. His privileged position caused resentment among the senatorial class and the imperial family, in particular earning him the enmity of Tiberius's son Drusus Julius Caesar.

The history of Sejanus and Drusus dated back to at least AD 15. That year a mutiny had broken out among legions posted in Pannonia and Germania. While his adopted son Germanicus restored order in Germania, Tiberius's biological son Drusus was sent to quell the uprising in Pannonia, accompanied by Sejanus and two Praetorian cohorts. In part due to what the soldiers believed to be bad omens, Drusus quickly restored stability in the army and put the chief instigators to death publicly. The camp was purged of mutineers by the Praetorians and the legions returned to the winter barracks. Despite this success, the following years witnessed a growing animosity between Drusus and Sejanus.

Since the death of Germanicus, Drusus had been groomed as the successor of his father, commanding legions in Illyricum in AD 18, and sharing the consulship with Tiberius in AD 21. In practice, Sejanus remained the second man in the empire, and was ambitious to expand his power. As early as AD 20, Sejanus had sought to solidify his connection with the imperial family by betrothing his daughter Junilla to the son of Claudius, Claudius Drusus. At the time the girl was only 4 years old but the marriage never happened, as the boy mysteriously died a few days later of asphyxiation.

When this failed, it seems Sejanus turned his attention toward eliminating Drusus. By AD 23 the enmity between the two men had reached a critical point. During an argument, Drusus had struck the prefect with his fist and openly lamented that "a stranger was invited to assist in the government while the emperor's son was alive". As Tiberius was in his sixties, the possibility of Drusus succeeding him in the near future loomed large. To secure his position, Sejanus plotted against Drusus and seduced his wife Livilla. Later, some (including Tiberius) suspected Sejanus to have fathered two of Livilla's children, Tiberius Gemellus and Germanicus Gemellus. With her as an accomplice, Drusus was slowly poisoned and died of seemingly natural causes on September 13, AD 23.

=== Consolidation of power ===
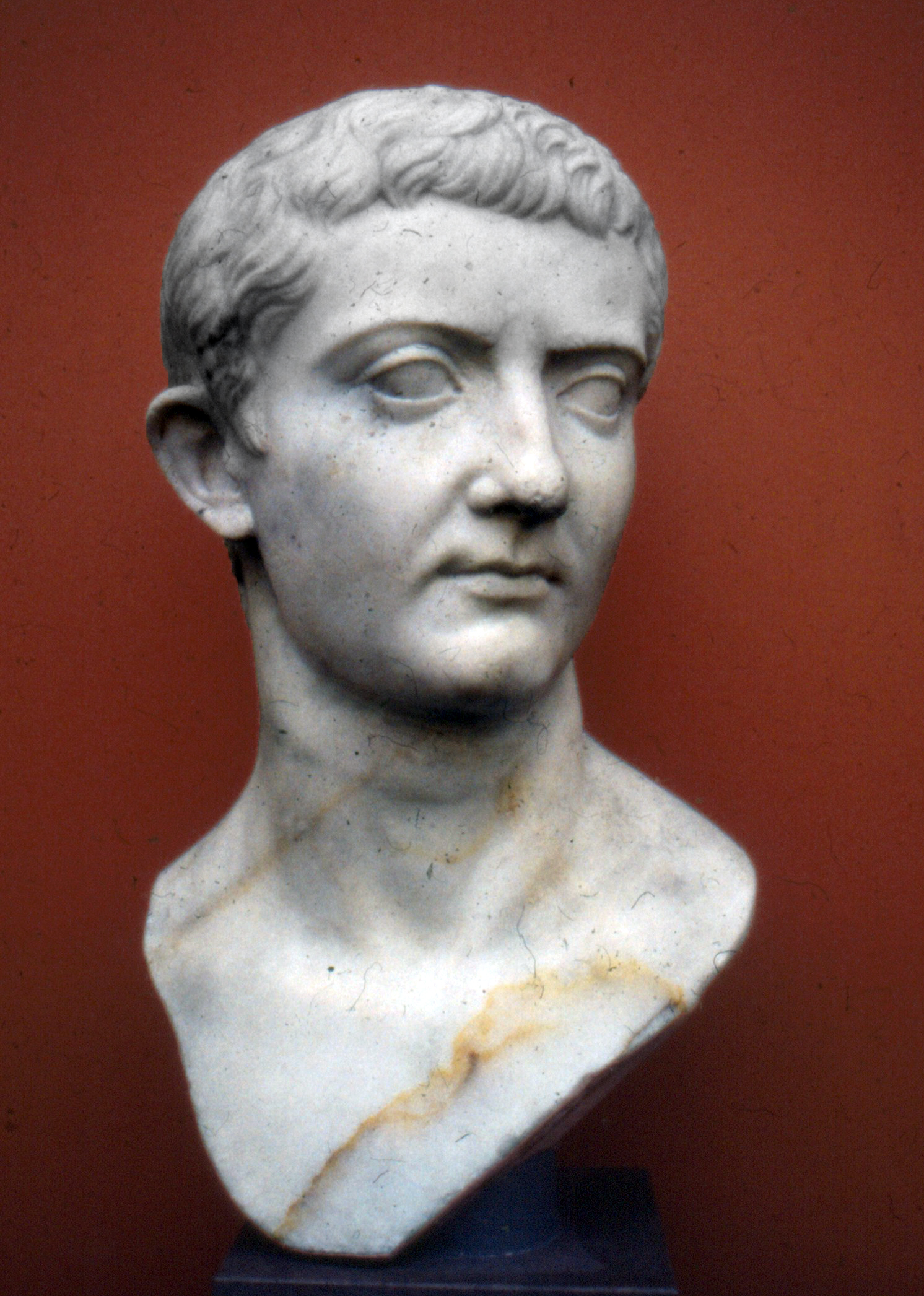
Bust of Emperor Tiberius (Ny Carlsberg Glyptotek, Copenhagen). During the twenties Tiberius became increasingly disillusioned with Roman politics, and eventually withdrew to the island of Capri, leaving the administration largely in the hands of Sejanus.

The loss of his son was a major blow to Tiberius, personally and politically. Over the years he had grown increasingly disillusioned with the position of Princeps, and by sharing the tribunician powers with Drusus in AD 22 he had prepared to relinquish some of his responsibilities in favour of his son. With these hopes now dashed, Tiberius left his administration more than ever in the care of Sejanus and looked toward the sons of Germanicus (Nero Caesar, Drusus Caesar, and Caligula) as possible heirs.

Germanicus had died in AD 19, in somewhat suspicious circumstances in Syria. Following his death, his wife Agrippina the Elder returned to Rome with their six children and became increasingly involved with a group of senators who opposed the growing power of Sejanus. Her relations with Tiberius became increasingly fraught, as she made it clear that she believed that he was responsible for the death of Germanicus. The climate was further poisoned by the hatred that Tiberius's mother Livia Drusilla (the widow of Augustus) felt for her, since Agrippina's ambition, to be the mother of emperors and thus Rome's first woman, was an open secret. Sejanus saw Agrippina's sons Nero, Drusus, and Caligula as a threat to his power.

Sejanus again attempted to marry into the Julio-Claudian family. Having divorced Apicata two years earlier, in AD 25 he asked to marry Drusus' widow Livilla, possibly with an eye towards placing himself, as an adopted Julian, in the position of a potential successor. The emperor denied this request, warning Sejanus that he was in danger of overstepping his rank. Alarmed by this sudden denigration, Sejanus changed his plans and began to isolate Tiberius from Rome. By fueling his paranoia towards Agrippina and the Senate, he induced the emperor to withdraw to the countryside of Campania, which he did in AD 26, and finally to the island of Capri, where he lived until his death in AD 37. Sejanus easily controlled all information that passed between Tiberius (guarded by the Praetorians) and the capital.

Despite the withdrawal of Tiberius from Rome's political scene, the presence of Livia seems to have checked Sejanus's overt power for a time. According to Tacitus, her death in AD 29 changed all that. Sejanus began a series of purge trials of senators and wealthy equestrians in the city, removing those capable of opposing his power as well as extending the imperial (and his own) treasury. Networks of spies and informers brought the victims to trial with false accusations of treason, and many chose suicide over the disgrace of being condemned and executed. Among those who perished were Gaius Asinius Gallus, a prominent senator and opponent of Tiberius who was linked to Agrippina's faction. Agrippina and her sons Nero and Drusus were arrested and exiled in AD 30, and later starved to death in suspicious circumstances. Only Caligula, the youngest son of Germanicus and Agrippina, survived the purges of Sejanus by moving to Capri with Tiberius in AD 31. His three younger sisters, Agrippina the Younger, Drusilla, and Livilla, also all survived the purges of Sejanus.

== Downfall ==
=== Denunciation ===
In AD 31, despite his equestrian rank, Sejanus shared the consulship with Tiberius in absentia, and finally became betrothed to Livilla. Tiberius had not been seen in Rome since AD 26 and senators and equestrians courted Sejanus's favour as if he were Emperor. His birthday was publicly observed and statues were erected in his honour. With most of the political opposition crushed, Sejanus felt his position was unassailable. The ancient historian Cassius Dio wrote:

Sejanus was so great a person by reason both of his excessive haughtiness and of his vast power, that, to put it briefly, he himself seemed to be the emperor and Tiberius a kind of island potentate, inasmuch as the latter spent his time on the island of Capreae.

Through years of intrigues and service to the emperor, Sejanus worked himself up to become one of the most powerful men in the Empire.

But suddenly, at the end of AD 31, he was arrested, summarily executed and his body unceremoniously cast down the Gemonian stairs. What caused his downfall is unclear: ancient historians disagree about the nature of his conspiracy, whether it was Tiberius or Sejanus who struck first and in which order subsequent events occurred. Modern historians consider it unlikely that Sejanus plotted to seize power and, if he had planned so at all, rather might have aimed at overthrowing Tiberius to serve as a regent to Tiberius Gemellus, son of Drusus, or possibly Gaius Caligula. Unfortunately the relevant section pertaining to this period in the Annals of Tacitus has been lost. According to Josephus, it was Antonia, the mother of Livilla, who finally alerted Tiberius to the growing threat Sejanus posed (possibly with information provided by Satrius Secundus), in a letter she dispatched to Capri in the care of her freedman Pallas. According to Juvenal, a letter was sent from Capri with orders to execute Sejanus without a trial.

Further details concerning Sejanus's fall are provided by Cassius Dio, writing nearly 200 years later in his Roman History. It appears that, when Tiberius heard to what extent Sejanus had already usurped his authority in Rome, he immediately took steps to remove him from power. However, he realised that an outright condemnation could provoke Sejanus to attempt a coup. Instead, Tiberius addressed a number of contradictory letters to the Senate, some of which praised Sejanus and his friends and some of which denounced them. Tiberius variously announced that he would arrive in Rome the next day or that he was at the point of death. He stepped down as consul, forcing Sejanus to do the same and conferred an honorary priesthood upon Caligula, rekindling popular support for the house of Germanicus. The ensuing confusion was successful in alienating Sejanus from many of his followers. With the intentions of the emperor no longer clear, it was now deemed a safer course of action in Rome to withdraw from overtly supporting Sejanus until the matter was clearly resolved.

When it became obvious to Tiberius that support for Sejanus was not as strong as the emperor had feared, his next step was to choose Naevius Sutorius Macro, previously prefect of the vigiles (Roman police and fire department), to replace Sejanus and effect his downfall. On October 18, AD 31, Sejanus was summoned to a Senate meeting by a letter from Tiberius, ostensibly to bestow the tribunician powers upon him. At dawn, he entered the Senate; while the letter was being read, Macro assumed control of the Praetorian Guard, and members of the vigiles, led by Publius Graecinius Laco, surrounded the building. The senators at first congratulated Sejanus, but when the letter, which initially digressed into completely unrelated matters, suddenly denounced him and ordered his arrest, he was immediately apprehended and imprisoned in the Tullianum.

=== Execution and aftermath ===
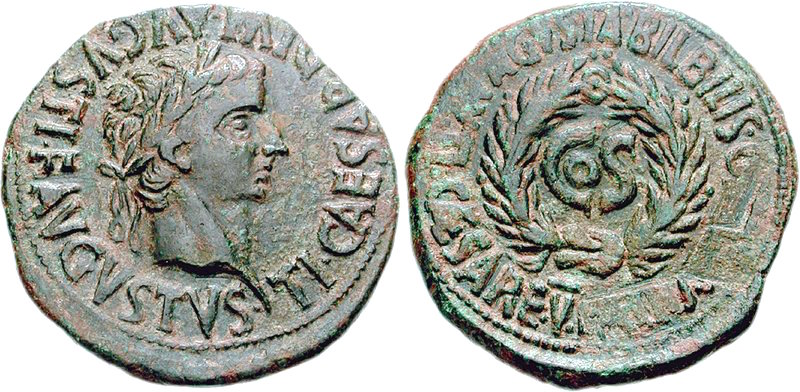
A coin from Augusta Bilbilis with the words L. Aelio Seiano erased as a result of his sentence

That same evening the Senate convened at the Temple of Concord and summarily condemned Sejanus to death. He was taken from prison and strangled, after which his body was cast onto the Gemonian stairs. Riots ensued, in which mobs hunted down and killed anyone they could link to Sejanus. The Praetorians also resorted to looting when they were accused of having conspired with the former prefect. Following the issue of damnatio memoriae by the Senate, Sejanus's statues were torn down and his name obliterated from all public records, even from coins, as in the one pictured opposite. On October 24, Sejanus's eldest son Strabo was arrested and executed. Upon learning of his death, Apicata committed suicide on October 26, after addressing a letter to Tiberius which claimed that Drusus had been poisoned with the complicity of Livilla. The accusations were further corroborated by confessions from Livilla's slaves, who, under torture, admitted to having administered the poison to Drusus.

Enraged upon learning the truth, Tiberius soon ordered more killings. Livilla committed suicide or was starved to death by her mother Antonia Minor. The remaining children of Sejanus, Capito Aelianus and Junilla, were executed in December of that year. Because there was no precedent for the capital punishment of a virgin, Junilla was said to have been raped first, with the rope around her neck and her body thrown down the Gemonian stairs along with her brother's. At the beginning of the following year, damnatio memoriae was also passed on Livilla.

Although Rome at first rejoiced at the demise of Sejanus, the city was quickly plunged into more extensive trials as Tiberius persecuted all those who could in any way be tied to the schemes of Sejanus or had courted his friendship. The Senatorial ranks were purged; the hardest hit were those families with political ties to the Julians. Even the imperial magistracy was not exempted from Tiberius's wrath. Arrests and executions were now supervised by Naevius Sutorius Macro, who succeeded Sejanus as the Prefect of the Praetorian Guard. The political turmoil continued until the death of Tiberius in AD 37, after which he was succeeded by Caligula.

Most historical documentation of Tiberius's revenge is given by Suetonius and Tacitus; their portrayal of a tyrannical, vengeful emperor has been challenged by several modern historians. Edward Togo Salmon wrote that,

In the whole twenty two years of Tiberius's reign, not more than fifty-two persons were accused of treason, of whom almost half escaped conviction, while the four innocent people to be condemned fell victims to the excessive zeal of the Senate, not to the Emperor's tyranny.

== Legacy ==
=== Praetorian Guard ===
The reforms of Sejanus most significantly included the founding of the Castra Praetoria, which established the Praetorian Guard as the powerful political force, for which it is primarily known today. Henceforth the Guard was at the disposal of the emperors, and the rulers were equally at the mercy of the Praetorians. The reality of this was seen in AD 31, when Tiberius was forced to rely upon the vigiles against the soldiers of his own guard. Although the Praetorian Guard proved faithful to the aging Tiberius, their potential political power had been made clear. The power Sejanus attained in his capacity as prefect proved Maecenas right in his prediction to Augustus, that it was dangerous to allow one man to command the guard. Cassius Dio notes that after Sejanus, no other prefect except Gaius Fulvius Plautianus, who commanded the Guard under Septimius Severus, would rise to such influence.

=== Historiography ===
With the exception of Velleius Paterculus, ancient historians have universally condemned Sejanus, although accounts differ regarding the extent to which Sejanus was manipulated by Tiberius or the other way around. Suetonius Tranquillus asserts that Sejanus was merely an instrument of Tiberius, to hasten the downfall of Germanicus and his family and that he was quickly disposed of once he ceased to be useful. Tacitus, on the other hand, attributes much of the decline of Tiberius's rule after AD 23 to the corrupting influence of Sejanus, although he is generally also harsh on Tiberius.

Among the writers who fell victim to the regime of Sejanus and its aftermath, were the historians Aulus Cremutius Cordus and Velleius Paterculus and the poet Phaedrus. Cordus was brought to trial in AD 25 by Sejanus, under accusations of treason. He was charged for having eulogized Marcus Junius Brutus and spoken of Gaius Cassius Longinus as the last of the true Romans, which was considered an offence under the Lex Maiestatis; the Senate ordered the burning of his writings. His fall is elaborated upon by Seneca the Younger, in his letter to Cordus' daughter Marcia To Marcia, On Consolation. Seneca tells us that her father most likely incurred Sejanus's displeasure for criticising him because he had commissioned a statue of himself. We also know from this source that Cordus starved himself to death. Marcia was instrumental in saving her father's work so that it could be published again under Caligula.

Phaedrus was suspected of having alluded to Sejanus in his Fables and received some unknown punishment short of death (Cf. Fables I.1, I.2.24, and I.17). Velleius Paterculus was an historian and contemporary of Sejanus, whose two-volume The Roman History details a history of Rome from the fall of Troy until the death of Livia Augusta in AD 29. In his work he praised Tiberius and Sejanus, even defending the latter's high position in the government, despite not ranking higher than equestrian. It has been conjectured that he was put to death as a friend of Sejanus.

=== Literary and cultural interpretations ===
Sejanus's fall is depicted in the section in Juvenal's Satire X on the emptiness of power. This reviews the destruction of his statues after the damnatio memoriae judgment and reflects on the fickleness of public opinion. The dramatist Ben Jonson borrowed from the poem for some passages in his Sejanus: His Fall. The play is seen as a topical reference to the fall of the former royal favourite, Robert Devereux, 2nd Earl of Essex, executed for treason two years before. Sejanus is also a leading figure in another Roman history play of about this time, the anonymous Tragedy of Claudius Tiberius Nero (1607).

Making contemporary political points in this way through reinterpretation of distant historical episodes was now common. In 17th century France, the fall of the powerful Cardinal Mazarin was celebrated in a political pamphlet that also drew parallels with the career of Sejanus, L'Ambitieux ou le portraict d'Aelius Sejanus en la personne du Cardinal Mazarin (Paris, 1642). In England other royal favourites were seen in these terms too. George Villiers, 1st Duke of Buckingham, is the target of an anonymous manuscript Roman tragedy, The Emperor's Favourite. The prudent need for anonymity is suggested by the arrest of Sir John Eliot, who was sent to the Tower of London for his outspoken criticism of the Duke in the 1626 parliament, comparing him to Sejanus.

Following Buckingham's death in 1628, when it was safer to do so, a translation of a history by Pierre Matthieu was published under the title, The Powerful Favourite, the life of Aelius Sejanus. This was followed in 1634 by another translation, Sir Thomas Hawkins' Politicall Observations upon the Fall of Sejanus, which had originally been titled Della peripetia di fortuna (Of Changes of Fortune) by its author, Giovanni Battista Manzini. Later in the century Anthony Ashley Cooper, 1st Earl of Shaftesbury, was the target of the four-page political pamphlet Sejanus, or The popular favourite, now in his solitude, and sufferings, signed with the pseudonym Timothy Tory (1681). The story of Sejanus, with reference to the Earl's imprisonment in the Tower on a charge of treason, is interpreted as an argument for absolute monarchy, direct rule without the intermediary of politicians.

The name of Sejanus continued to be pressed into political service during the 18th century. Prime Minister Robert Walpole was attacked in 1735 in the course of a popular skit, C----- and country: A play of seven acts...the whole concluding with the grand masque, call'd, The downfall of Sejanus; its authorship is attributed to 'a masquerader' and in the printed version the masque precedes the play, although it is performed last. This gives the clue of how to take what is to follow and consists of a conversation between Punch and the Hangman, opening with the question 'Is this same Sejanus to go out of the World like a Man, or to die the Death of a mad Dog? For he has lived like a sad One, from the first Day that the Emperor Tiberius took him into Favour.' A subtler attack on a later prime minister occurred in 1769 when Jonson's Sejanus was reissued under the title of The Favourite. This was prefaced with a tongue-in-cheek dedication to Lord Bute, denying that there can be any comparison between the conduct of Sejanus and that of his lordship.

Elsewhere in Europe there were other dramatic adaptations of the story. They included Jean de Magnon's rhyming tragedy, Sejanus (1647) and Henri van der Zande's De dood van Elius Sejanus of Spiegel voor der vorsten gunstelingen (The death of Sejanus, a mirror for the favourites of princes, Amsterdam 1716). Later there was another recycling of Jonson's tragedy in England by the Irish actor Francis Gentleman. Abridged and 'improved' by some additions of his own, he published his Sejanus, a tragedy: as it was intended for the stage (1752), when he could not get it acted. Later plays include a 5-act tragedy by A.Arterton (1875) and the privately printed Sejanus: A Tragedy in Five Acts by P. J. A. Chaulk (1923)

A later fictional treatment of the historical episode appeared as the first story of Edward Maturin's Sejanus, and Other Roman Tales (New York 1839). It also figures in Robert Graves' I, Claudius (1934) and its 1976 television adaption, in which he was portrayed by Patrick Stewart. In Graves' version Antonia sends the letter of accusation to Tiberius via Claudius, after discovering her daughter is plotting with Sejanus. And since Pontius Pilate was a nominee of Sejanus and implicated in his anti-Jewish policies, it encouraged the inclusion of Sejanus in novels dealing with the circumstances of Jesus Christ's crucifixion. The first of these was Miles Gerald Keon's Dion and the Sibyls: A Classic Christian Novel (London, 1866); later examples include Paul L. Maier's Pontius Pilate (Grand Rapids MI 1968) and Chris Seepe's The Conspiracy to Assassinate Jesus Christ (Toronto 2012).

The aim of some later novels has been to concentrate as much on local colour as on the story. This was true of William Percival Crozier's historical romance The Fates Are Laughing (1945), which was written by a classicist with an eye for detail and set during the fall of Sejanus and the reign of Caligula. It is equally true of some recent detective novels set in Roman times. David Wishart's Sejanus (London, 1998) features Marcus Corvinus, and James Mace's Empire Betrayed: The Fall of Sejanus (2013) focused on a military colleague, Aulus Nautius Cursor.

== Sources ==
- Tacitus, Cornelius (1942) [109]. Hadas, Moses (ed.). The Complete Works of Tacitus. The Annals (From the Passing of the Divine Augustus) [1876]…. Church, Alfred John & Brodribb, William Jackson (transl.). New York, NY: The Modern Library. ASIN B0006APTTQ. See digital versions at Wikisource, MIT, and Perseus (Tufts University). A further edition, see Tacitus, Cornelius (1942). Bryant, Sara (ed.). The Complete Works of Tacitus. The Annals…. Church & Brodribb (transl.). New York, NY: Perseus/Random House.
- Bingham, Sandra J. (1997). The Praetorian Guard in the Political and Social Life of Julio-Claudian Rome (PDF) (Ph.D. Dissertation). Vancouver, BC and Ottawa, ON: The University of British Columbia and National Library of Canada. ISBN 0612271064.
- Dio Cocceianus, Cassius (1924). Foster, Herbert Baldwin (ed.). Roman History. Loeb Classical Library, Vol. VII, Books 56–60. Cary, Earnest (transl.). London, New York: William Heinemann, Harvard University Press. ISBN 0674991931. See digital versions at Wikisource, Penelope (The University of Chicago), and Perseus (Tufts University).
- Suetonius, The Lives of Twelve Caesars, Life of Tiberius, Latin text with English translation.
- Josephus, Antiquities of the Jews Book XVIII, Chapter 6 English translation.
- Seneca the Younger, Essays To Marcia On Consolation English translation.
- Juvenal Satires, 10th Satire Latin text.

Political offices
Preceded by Lucius Seius Strabo	Praetorian prefect 14–31	Succeeded by Naevius Sutorius Macro
Preceded by Lucius Naevius Surdinus, and Gaius Cassius Longinus as Suffect consul	Consul of the Roman Empire; 31 with Tiberius Caesar Augustus V	Succeeded by Faustus Cornelius Sulla Lucullus, and Sextus Tedius Valerius Catullus as Suffect consul
